= Fishing bait =

Object or substance used to attract fish

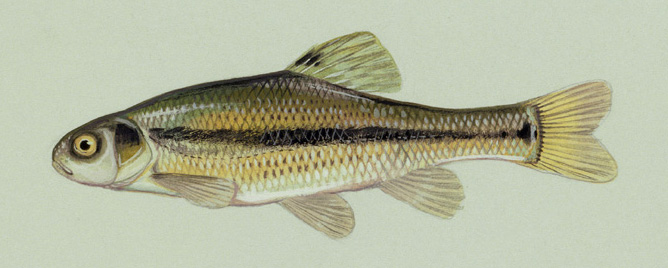
Fathead minnow, a common bait fish

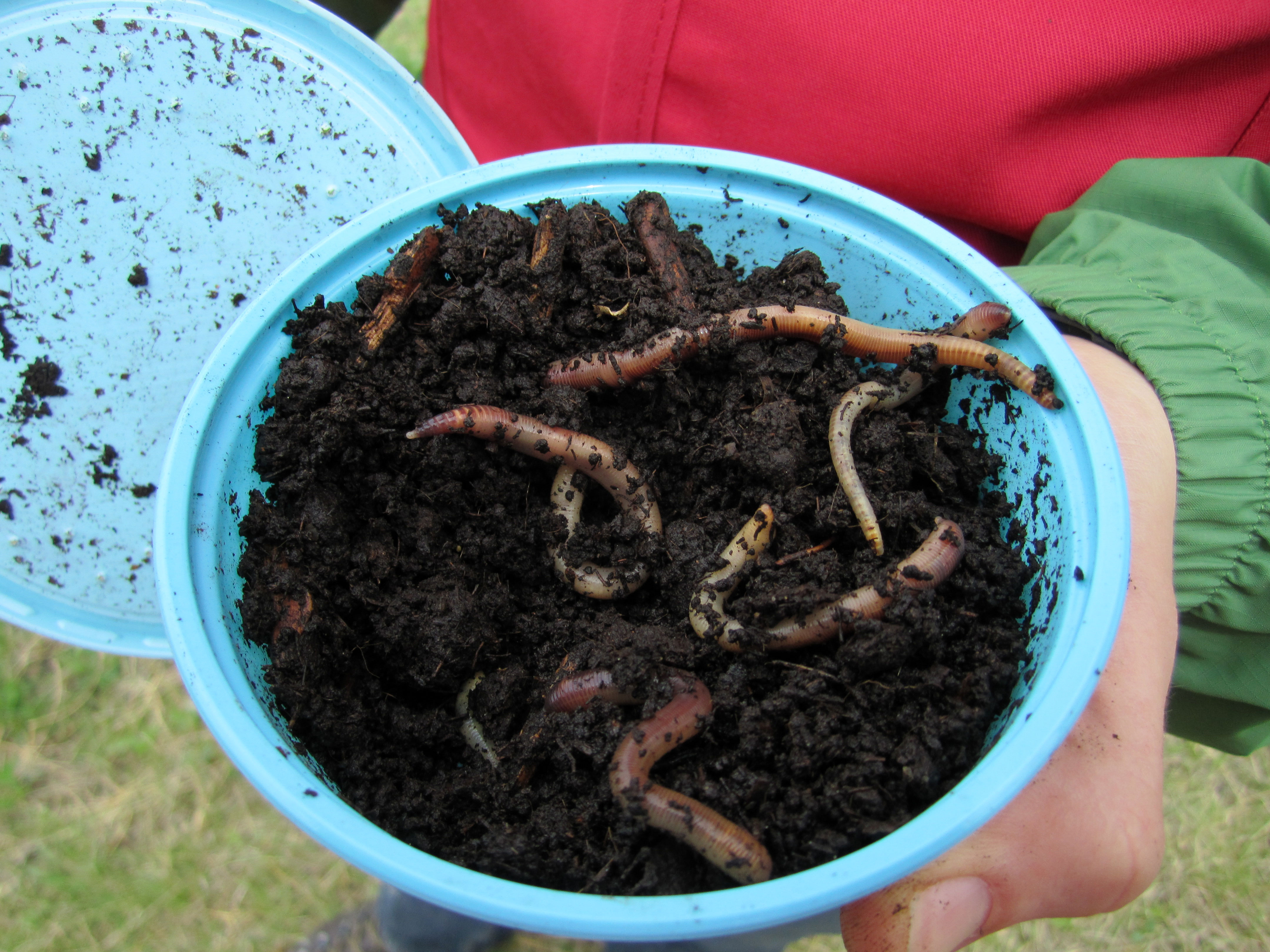
A container of earthworms (nightcrawlers) for use as bait

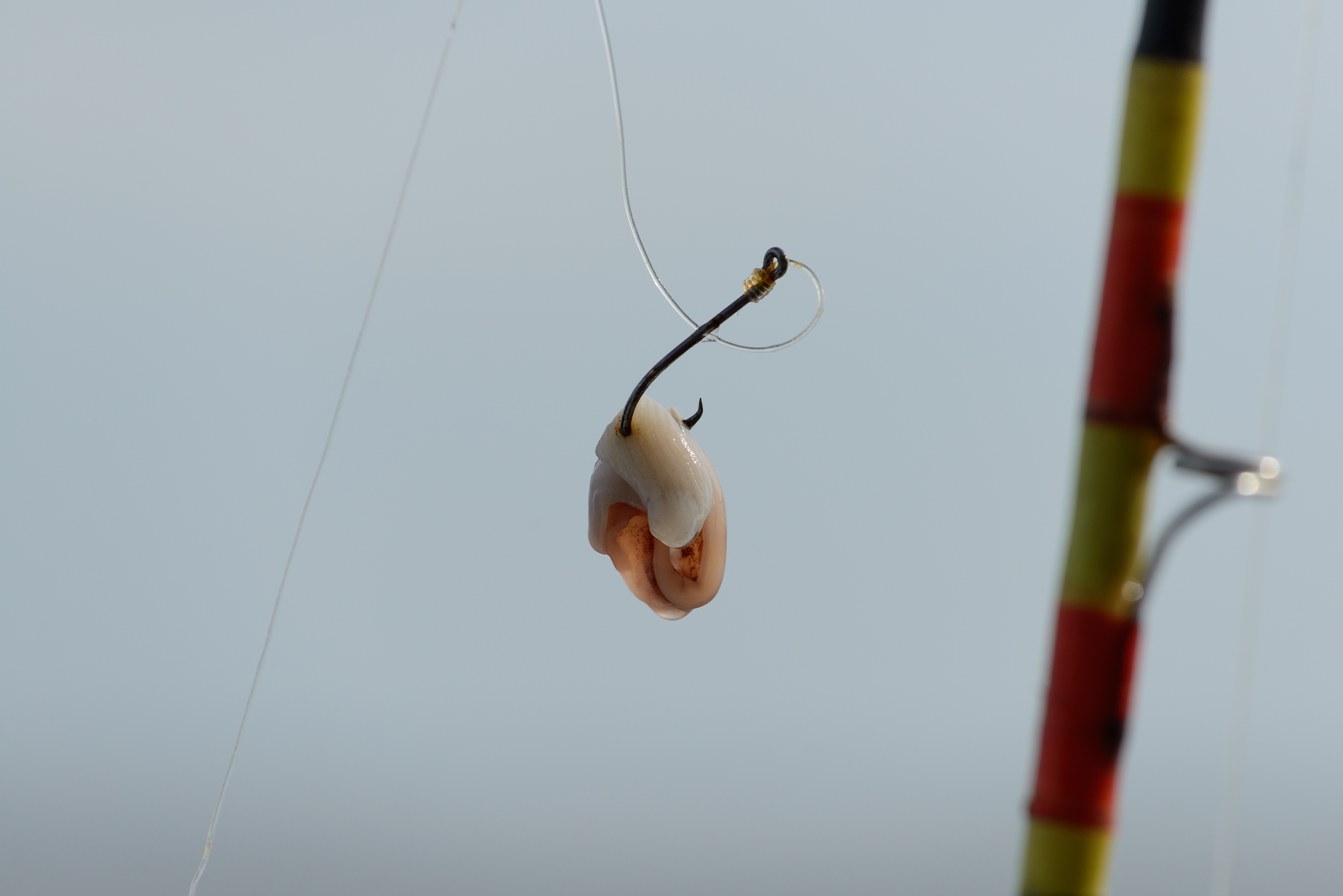
Mussel meat used as cutbait on a hook

Fishing bait is any luring substance used specifically to attract and catch fish, typically when angling with a hook and line. There are generally two types of baits used in angling: hookbaits, which are directly mounted onto fish hooks and are what the term "fishing bait" typically refers to; and groundbaits, which are scattered separately into the water as an "appetizer" to attract the fish nearer to the hook. Despite the bait's importance in provoking a feeding response out of the target fish, the way that fish react to different baits is quite poorly understood.

Fishing baits can be grouped into two broad categories: natural baits and artificial baits. Traditionally, fishing baits are natural food or prey items (live or dead) that are already present in the fish's normal diet (e.g. worms, insects, crustaceans and smaller bait fish), and such baits are both procured from and used within the same environment. Artificial baits, conversely, are not naturally acquired and must involve some kind of production process. These can be processed foods (e.g. bread, cheese, dough, cutlets, fish food or pet food pellets, etc.), commercially made feed mixtures (e.g. boilies), or imitative replica "fake foods" made of inedible materials known as lures (e.g. plastic worm, swimbaits, spoons, stickbaits, hybrid spinners or even bionic robot fish). The variety of baits that a fisherman may choose is dictated mainly by the target species and by its habitat, as well as personal preference. Both natural and artificial baits frequently demonstrate similar efficiency if chosen adequately for the target fish. The overall bait type, size and techniques used will affect the efficiency and yield when fishing.

Fishing with baits does come with potential environmental concerns, especially when large quantities of non-native ingredients are involved. A common concern is that some live baits (e.g. crayfish and pond loach) can escape and become invasive species, or have the potential to spread diseases or serve as vectors for parasites (e.g. zebra mussel). It is also known that the use of artificial edible baits (especially groundbaits) can potentially cause eutrophication in the local water, which may lead to harmful algal blooms. Using inedible lures, on the other hand, is associated with the issues of littering or loss of said lures, which typically do not biodegrade and can cause problems for the ecosystem, especially if ingested by wildlife. Many materials used to make lures, such as lead (ubiquitous in jigheads), plastics and paint, can degrade after prolonged exposure to the elements and release harmful toxic heavy metals, volatile organic compounds and microplastics that are harmful to the environment.

== Types ==
=== Natural baits ===
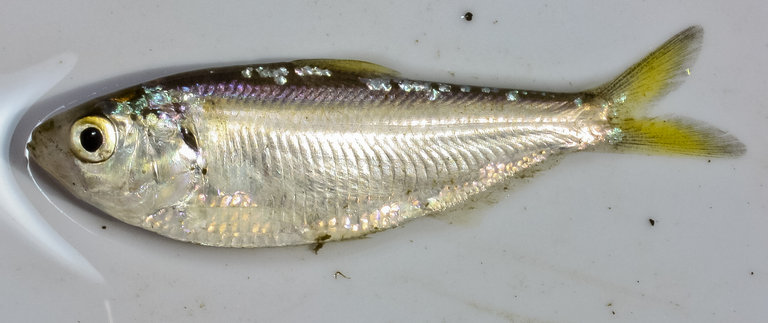
Threadfin shad (Dorosoma petenense), a freshwater forage fish commonly captured as live bait

The natural bait angler, with few exceptions, will use a common prey species of the fish as an attractant. The natural bait used may be alive or dead. Common natural baits include worms (most commonly earthworm and bloodworm), leeches (notably bait-leech Nephelopsis obscura), insects (both adults and larvae), minnows, frogs, salamanders and crayfish. Natural baits are effective due to the lifelike texture, odor and color of the bait presented. Studies show that natural baits like croaker and shrimp are more recognized by the fish and are more readily accepted.

Live bait being used to catch native species is a sustainable and desirable activity in a social and economical aspect, although it is subjected to local regulations which may restrict usage due to ecological and ethical concerns. The availability of live bait and cost factor can inhibit the use of natural baits year round. Anglers can get various live baits from tackle shops at the limitations of price and season. Other ways anglers get natural bait is through usual methods of fishing, e.g. hook and line, traps and casting nets. Once live bait has been obtained, it's important for the angler to keep it alive and fresh for it to be effective. Many anglers opt for a bait pen or small fish cages in order to store and preserve their live bait.

=== Artificial baits ===
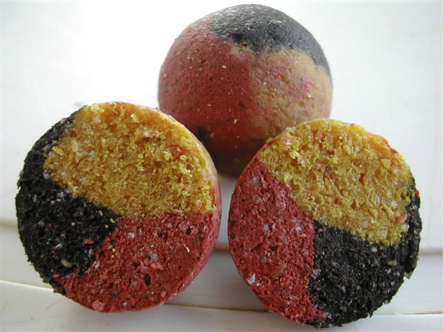
Boilie balls, a common commercial artificial bait for carp fishing

Artificial baits are baits that are not directly acquired via natural means, but are made from other materials via some kind of artificial processing. These can be fish food that are either homemade (e.g. dried food paste) or commercially purchased (e.g. boilies and feed pellets). Homemade artificial baits are often prepared/processed food such as cutlets, offals, dehulled kernels (e.g. pea and corn), dairy products (cheese and curd), bread or doughballs made from various ingredient mixtures (e.g. cooked rice, semolina, cornmeal, bread crumbs and fishmeal, etc.), which can be used to attract omnivorous or even herbivorous fish.

In subtropical lakes such as those in Florida, panfish such as sunfish are such opportunistic feeders that they will even take out-of-the-packet pet food or even household wheat bread as bait. These bread baits are improvised readily from a small amount of bread, often moistened by saliva and sometimes softened by chewing, then squeezed into a small fish bite-sized ball and mounted onto the fishhook.

==== Lures ====
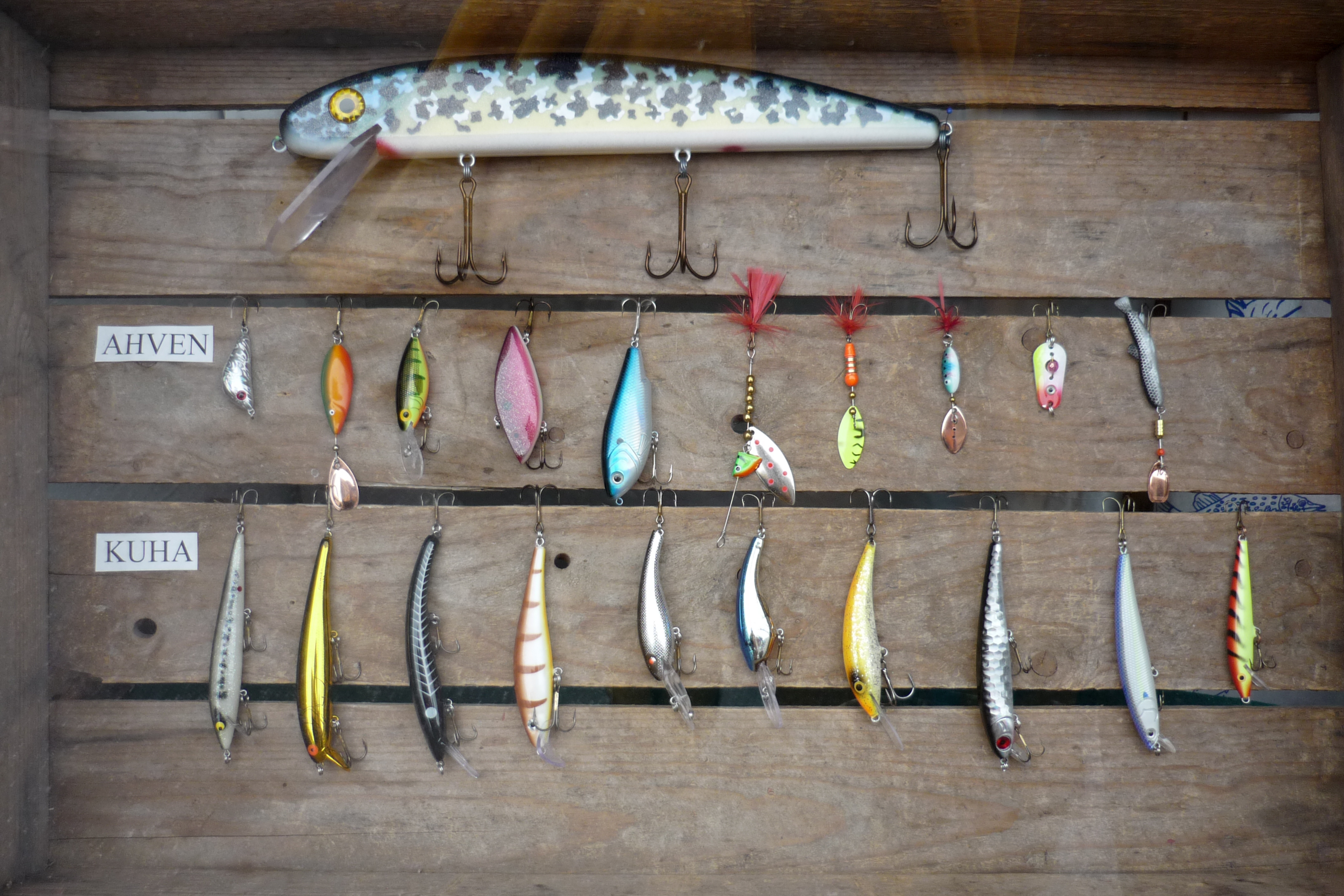
A collection of fishing lures resembling baitfish

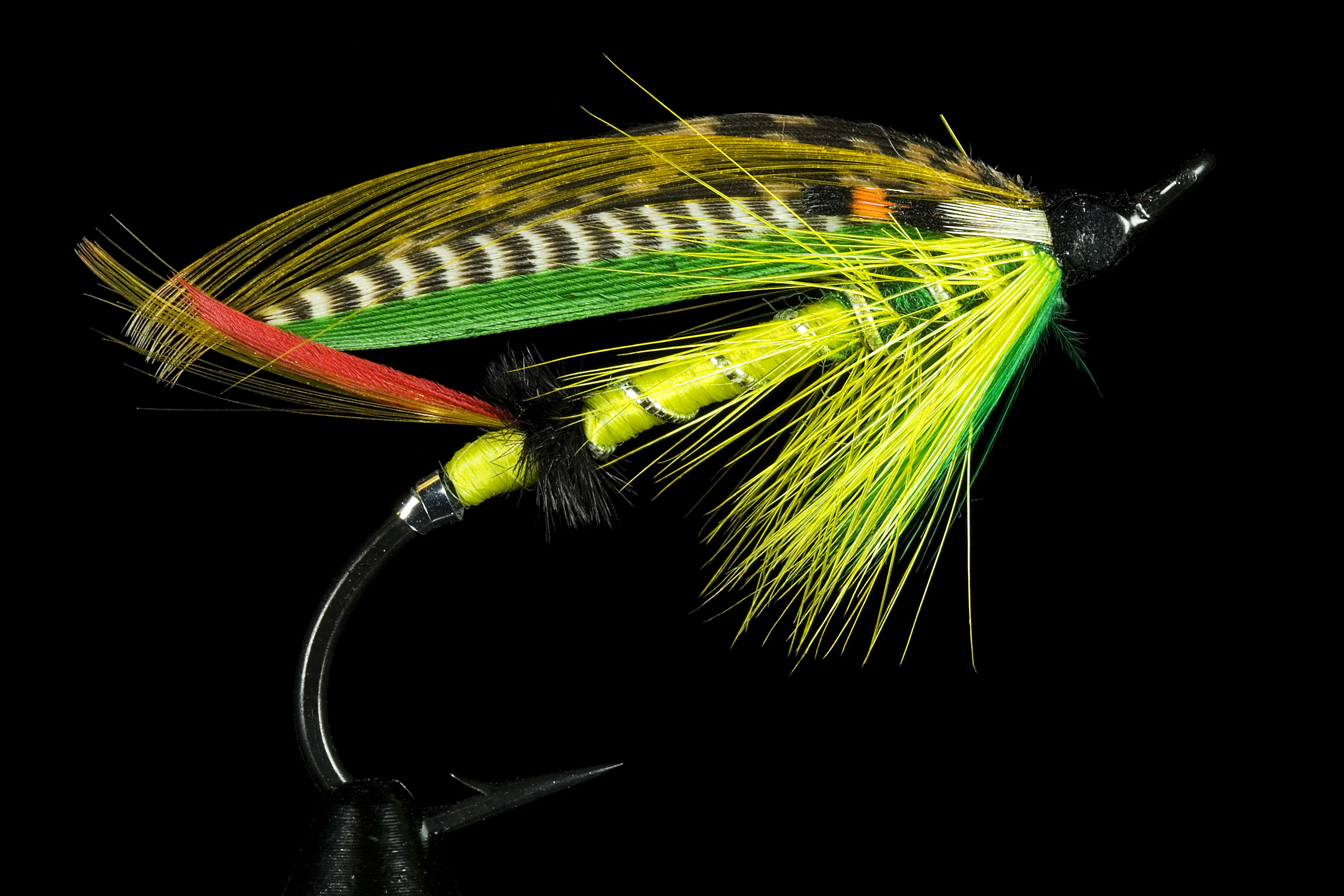
Green Highlander, an artificial fly used for salmon fishing.

Lures are inedible artificial baits that are replica "fake foods" designed to mimic the appearance of different prey (usually small fish, as well as worms). Because lures are made of non-biological materials, they do not use scent to attract the target (although chemical attractants can occasionally be added), and instead rely on movements, color/reflections, vibration and noise to attract and "fool" predatory fish into striking.

Using lures is a popular method among North American anglers, particularly for catching vision-oriented predators such as black bass, trout and pike. The lure may require a specialized presentation to impart an enticing action e.g. in fly fishing. Artificial lures are rigged with different types of hooks in order to increase catch rate. Artificial baits are manufactured to be durable and used repeatedly, unlike edible baits, which are generally single-use consumables. Some common fishing lures include: swimbaits, jerkbaits, crankbaits, surface lures (stickbaits), spoons, spinnerbaits, trout worms, frogs, etc.

Artificial baits are most commonly acquired online, in-store at tackle shops, and made by hand. Different manufacturers are continuously modifying lures with new hydrodynamic designs, materials and bionic technologies to better represent and attract the attention of fish. A study showed that the reason fish react to different colors of lures is due to their ability of see infrared rays being reflected off of lures. Companies have taken information like this into consideration so that they can make their lures in a way that maximizes efficiency.

== Groundbait ==
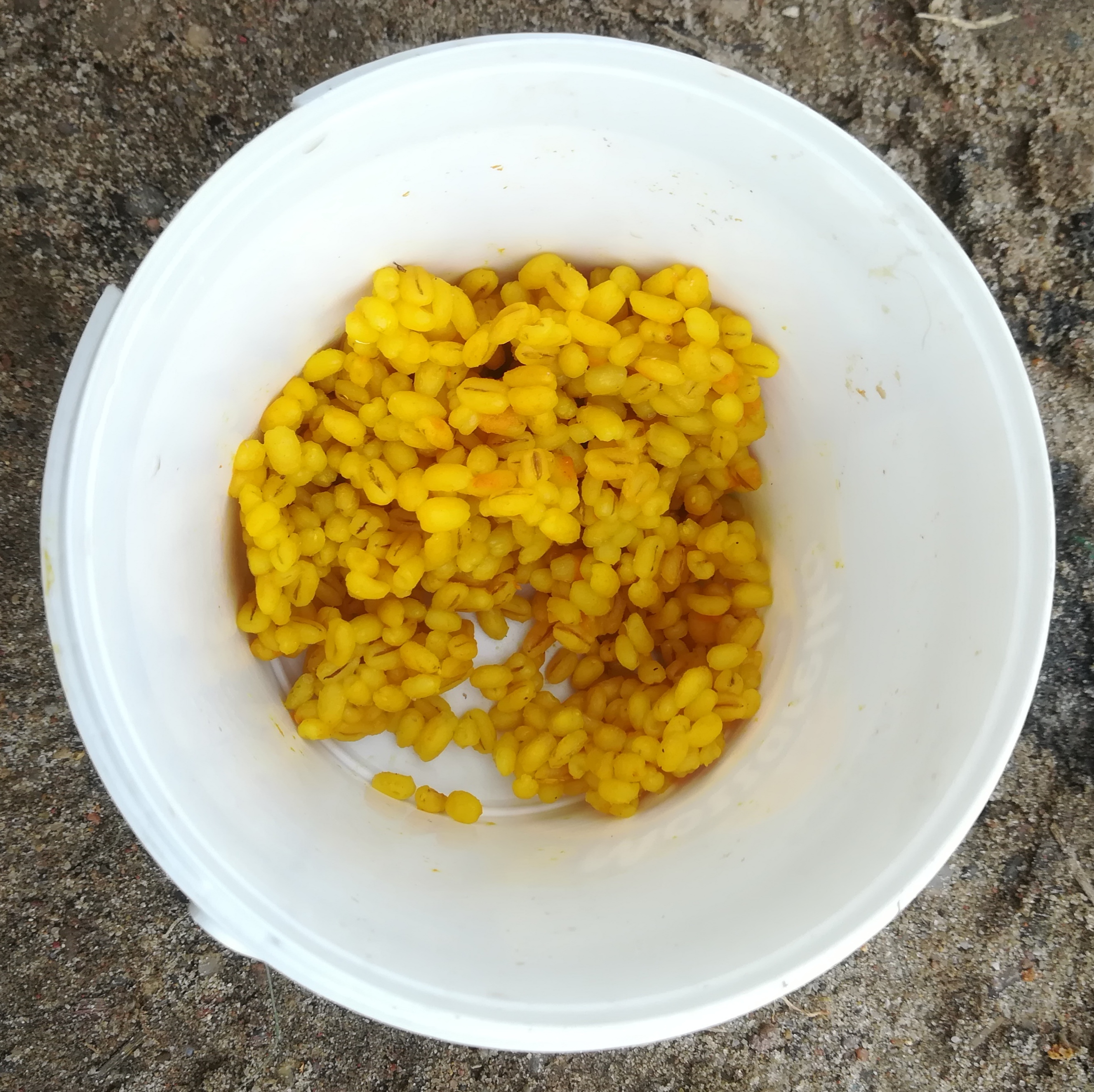
A bucket of groundbait made from baked beans

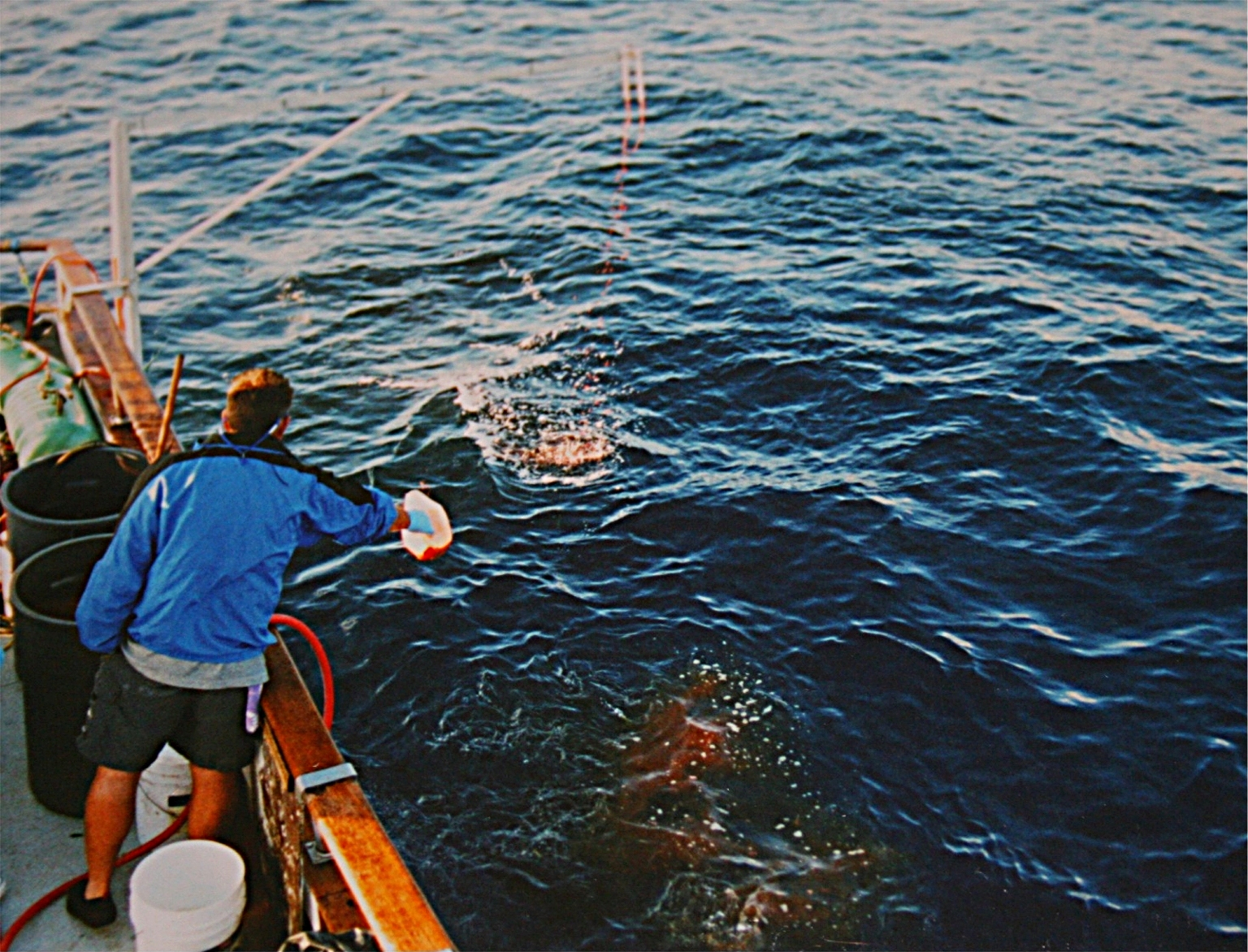
Chumming for sharks at Guadalupe Island, Mexico

Groundbaits are fishing baits that are thrown into the water as an "appetizer" in order to olfactorily attract more fish to a designated area (i.e. the fishing ground) and increase the chance of catching some. Groundbaits are typically scattered in large quantities separately from the hook, usually before even casting any rod or net, although in bottom fishing they can be deployed synchronously with hookbaits while contained inside a gradual-release device known as a method feeder.

Groundbaits are often used in freshwater coarse fishing, where the target fish are commonly omnivorous or algivorous and might not be easily drawn to strike the hookbait. Groundbaits can be custom-made by the angler, or bulk-purchased from dedicated manufacturers. Groundbaits can differ by the sizes of the crumbs, type of ingredients, smell, colour and texture/consistency. Anglers may also mix additives to alter the groundbait's firmness in order to control its rate of release and diffusion once in the water.

Groundbaits are also used frequently in blue water fishing, known as "chums", which usually consist of freshly cut up parts of a slaughtered fish often mixed with fresh blood and offals, in order to attract large hypercarnivorous fishes such as sharks either directly via the smell, or indirectly by drawing opportunistic forage fish that are prey to the predatory fishes.

== Impacts on environment ==
=== Spreading disease ===
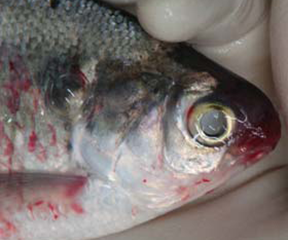
Viral Hemorrhagic Septicemia (VHS) disease in a gizzard shad.

The capture, transportation, and culture of bait fish can spread damaging organisms between ecosystems, endangering them. In 2007, several American states enacted regulations designed to slow the spread of fish diseases, including viral hemorrhagic septicemia, by bait fish. Because of the risk of transmitting Myxobolus cerebralis (whirling disease), trout and salmon should not be used as bait. The Non-indigenous Aquatic Nuisance Act of 1990 focuses on the effect of aquatic nuisance species. The introduction of these invasive species in various bodies of water have spread disease, killed fish, clogged water intakes, and covered beaches and boats.

Anglers may increase the possibility of contamination by emptying bait buckets into fishing venues and collecting or using bait improperly. The transportation of fish from one location to another can break the law and cause the introduction of fish alien to the ecosystem. There has been legislation passed within the last couple years in attempt of protecting big and small fisheries.

=== Nutrient pollution and anoxia ===
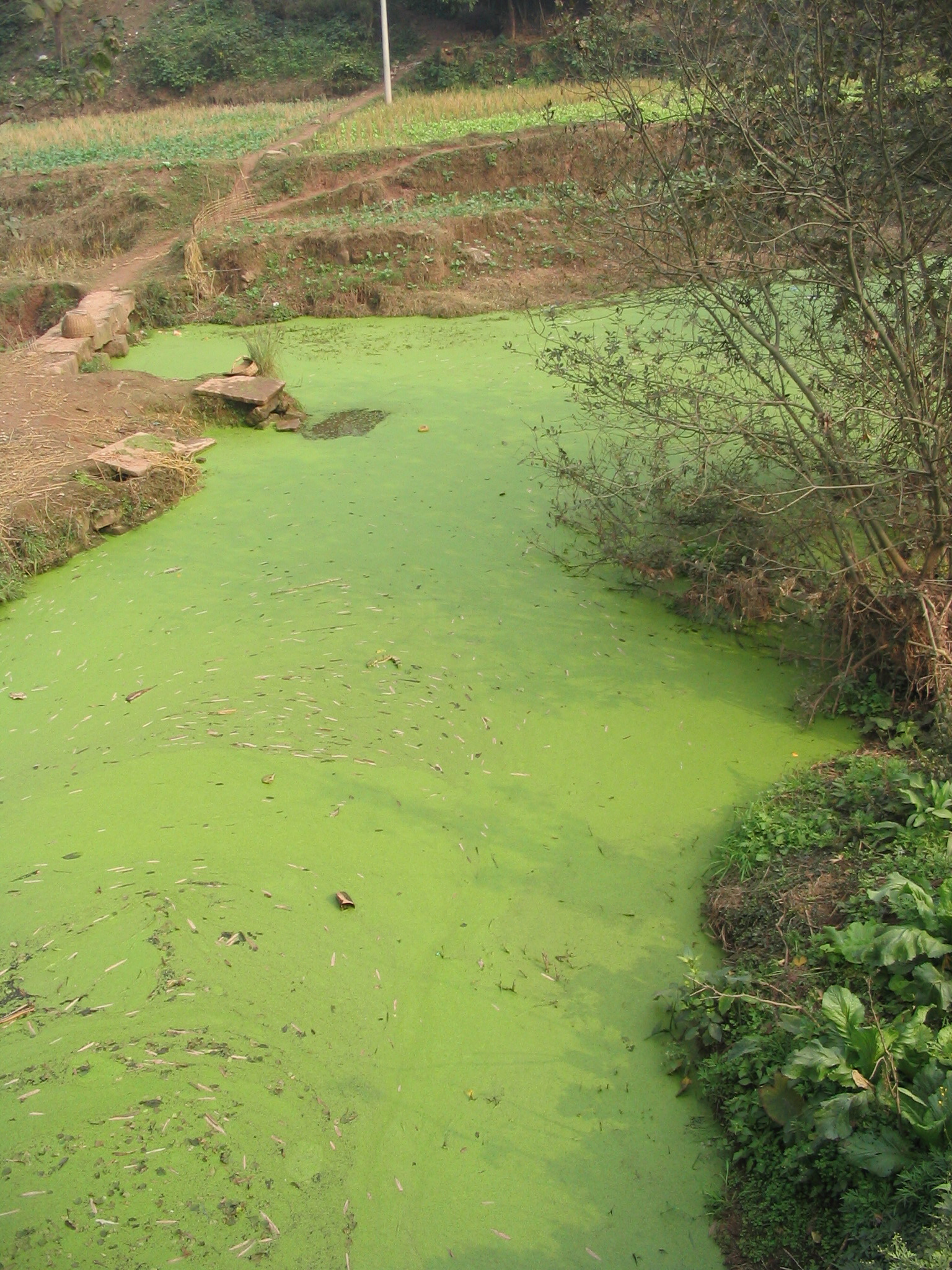
Eutrophication can cause algal blooms, which causes anoxia that are harmful to aquatic life.

The use of commercially refined baits, particularly groundbaits (which are typically used in significant quantities), raises concern of alteration to nutrient balance where the bait is applied, especially in areas of more stagnant backwaters. A 1987 Welsh study had shown that after cereal or maggot groundbaiting over a 12-week period, nearly all benthic invertebrate taxa except the tubificid Limnodrilus hoffmeisteri were reduced in density, especially the naidid worms and cladocerans, and the recovery was not apparent after 4 months, although cyclopoid copepods were significantly more abundant in treated areas. Laboratory experiments determine that biochemical oxygen demand can be increased 100-fold by a single application of cereal bait, and this increased demand could result in local deoxygenation under warm, calm conditions.

A Portuguese study showed that the use of 5–10 kg (11–22 lb) of groundbait per angler (approximately 3–20 tons of groundbait per year) did not alter the ecological functioning of the local reservoir but higher angling pressures may lead to a significant increase in nutrient concentrations, and suggested anglers choose groundbaits with low eutrophication potential. A later study by the team showed that nutrient inputs from the use of commercial groundbaits could be compensated by sacrificing (removing) the captured fish, but if complete catch-and-release is practiced (thus no biomass is removed), the inputs of total nitrogen (TN) and total phosphorus (TP) are about four- and three- times higher respectively than if groundbaits are not used.

=== Littering ===
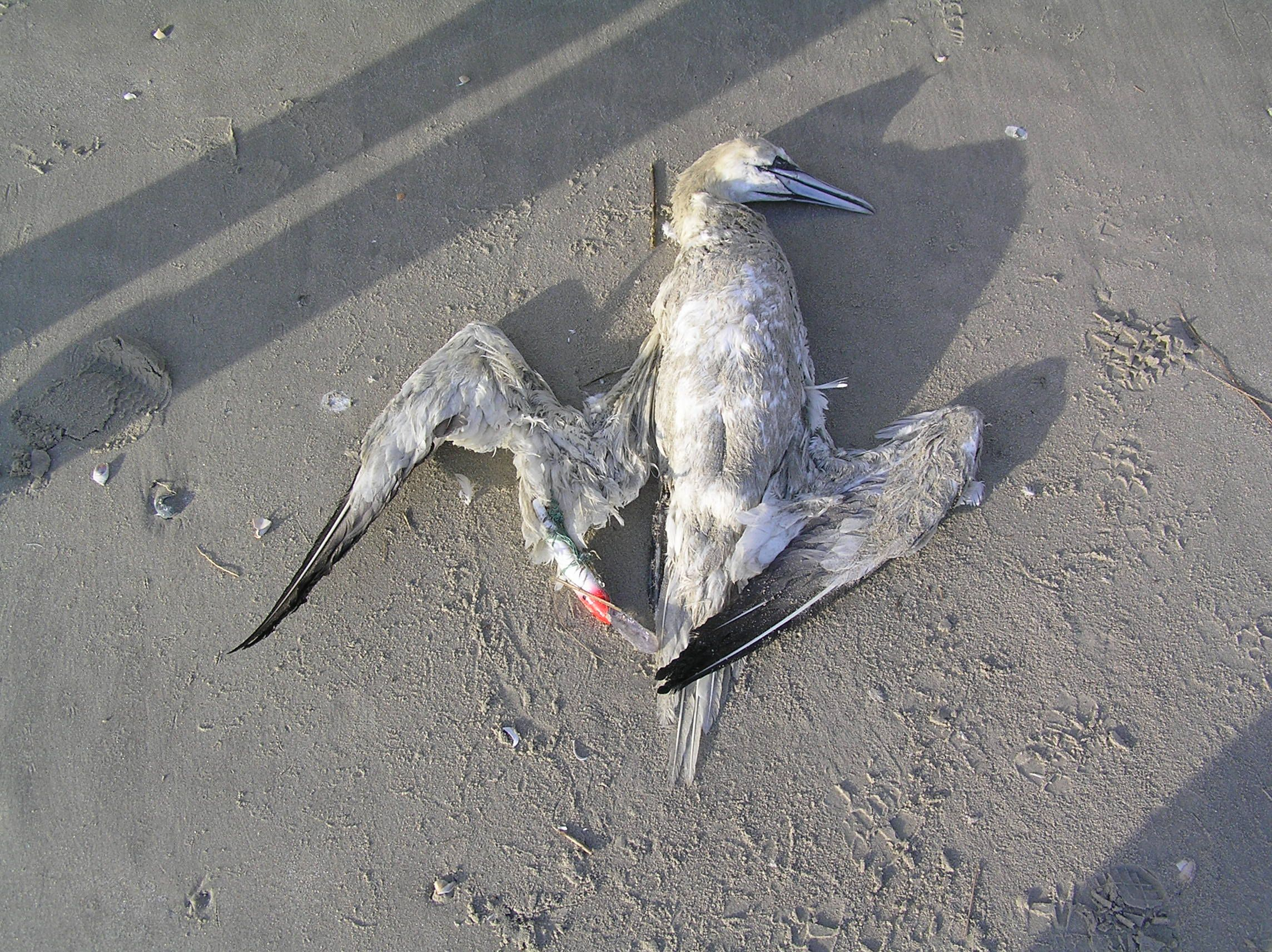
A dead gannet entangled by the line on a crankbait

The popularity of artificial baits, especially lures, has increased drastically over time. With this, concerns of harm to the environment have been brought up. One of these concerns comes from the lost or carelessly discarded lures left in the environment, as these tackles are made of materials that typically do not biodegrade easily. The littering of lines and lures, intentional or not, can cause potential harm to the ecosystem, especially to water birds, reptiles and semiaquatic mammals who can mistakenly strike at abandoned lures and get entangled by the line or injured by the lure hooks (especially barbed hooks that cannot be easily dislodged). Another concern would be towards the health of the fish, as it is not uncommon to catch fish with lost treble hooked lures lodged inside the mouth, gullet and even gills, and these fish often suffer starvation from inability to properly ingest food due to the lure obstruction. Along with that, fish will swallow discarded fishing line, which can get retained in the fish's gut and cause digestive tract complications.

Many materials used in the manufacturing of lures, such as lead (ubiquitous in jigheads and bottom rigs), plastics and paint, can degrade after prolonged exposure to the elements and release harmful toxic heavy metals, volatile organic compounds and microplastics that are either hazardous to the planktons and other small basal organisms, or get concentrated through the food chain.

== Gallery ==
Some common baits that fish will go after.

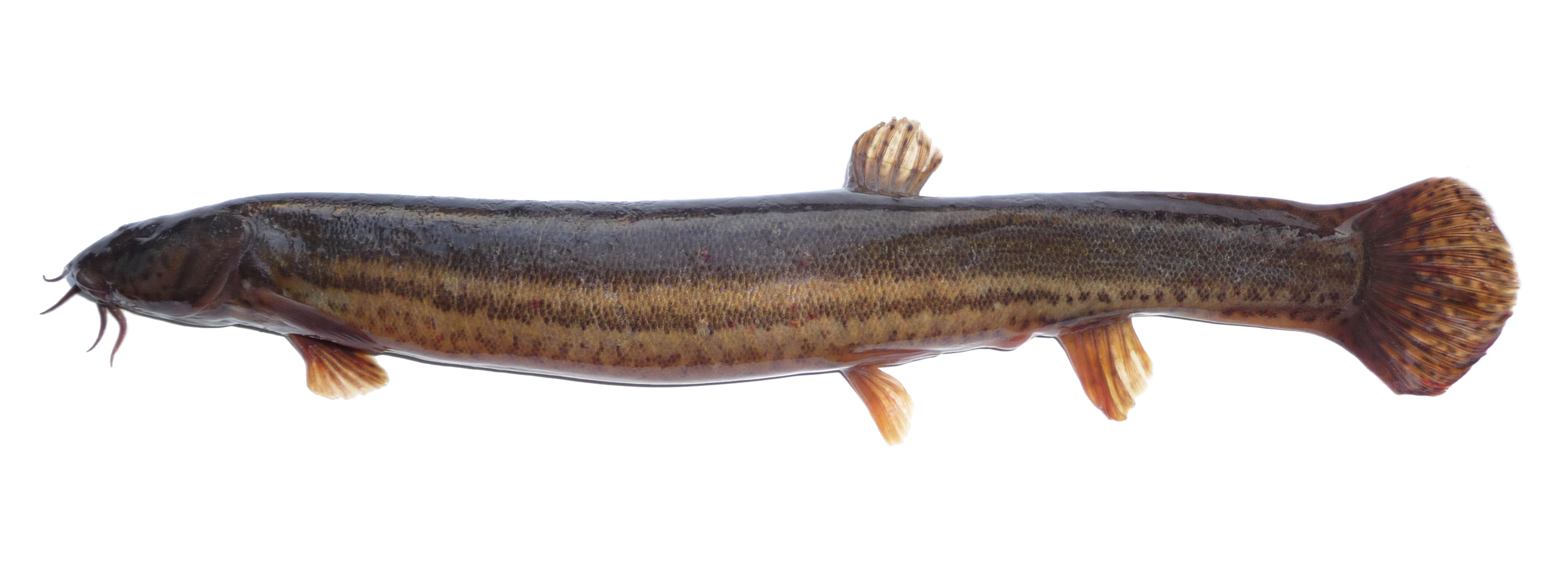
A bait fish (weather loach)

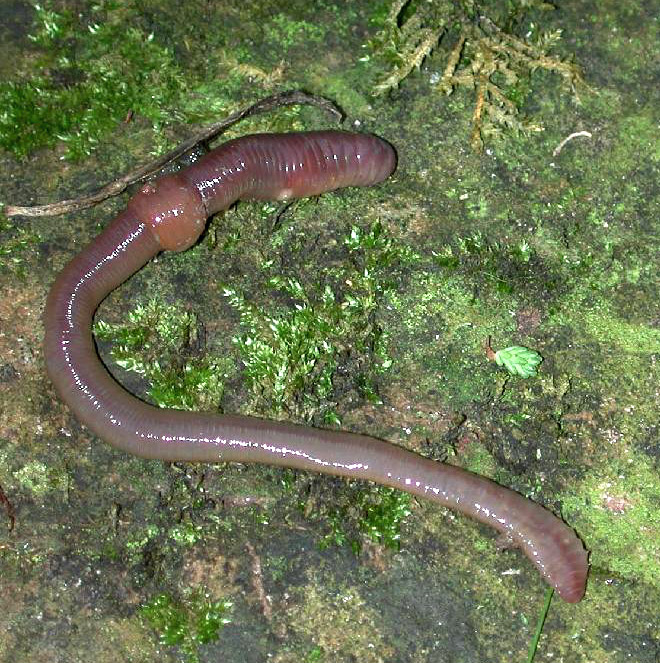
Lob worm

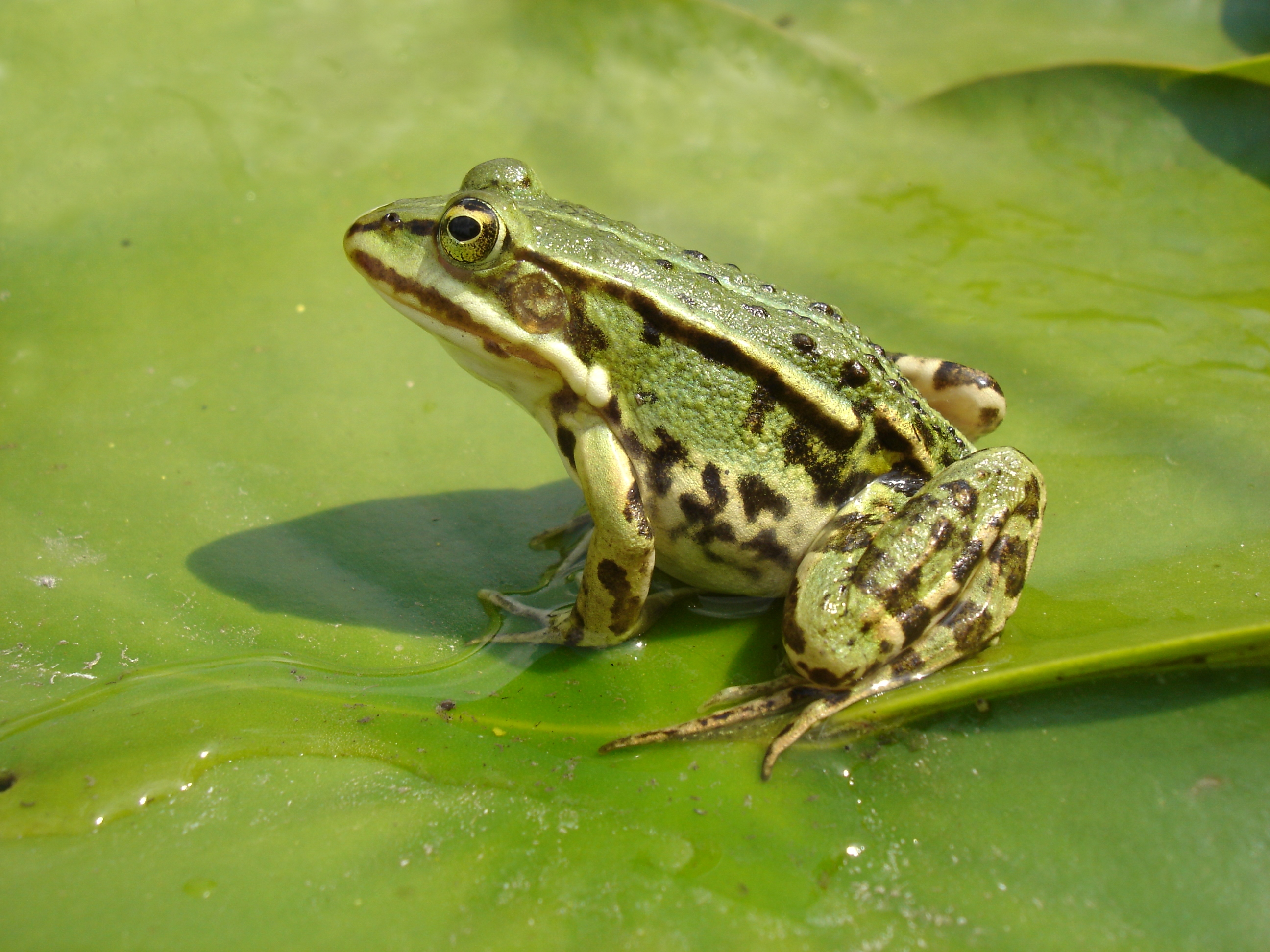
Frog

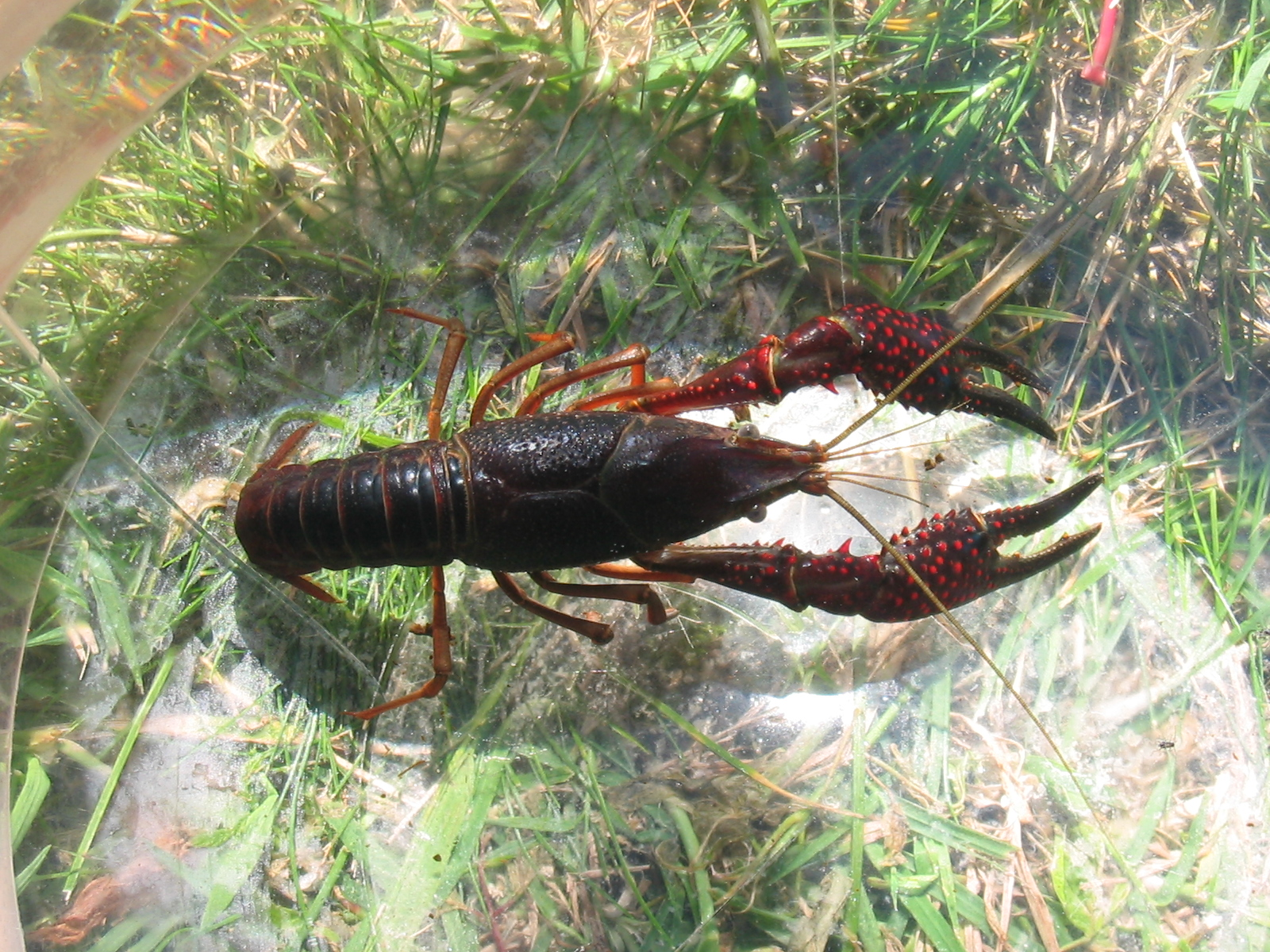
Crayfish

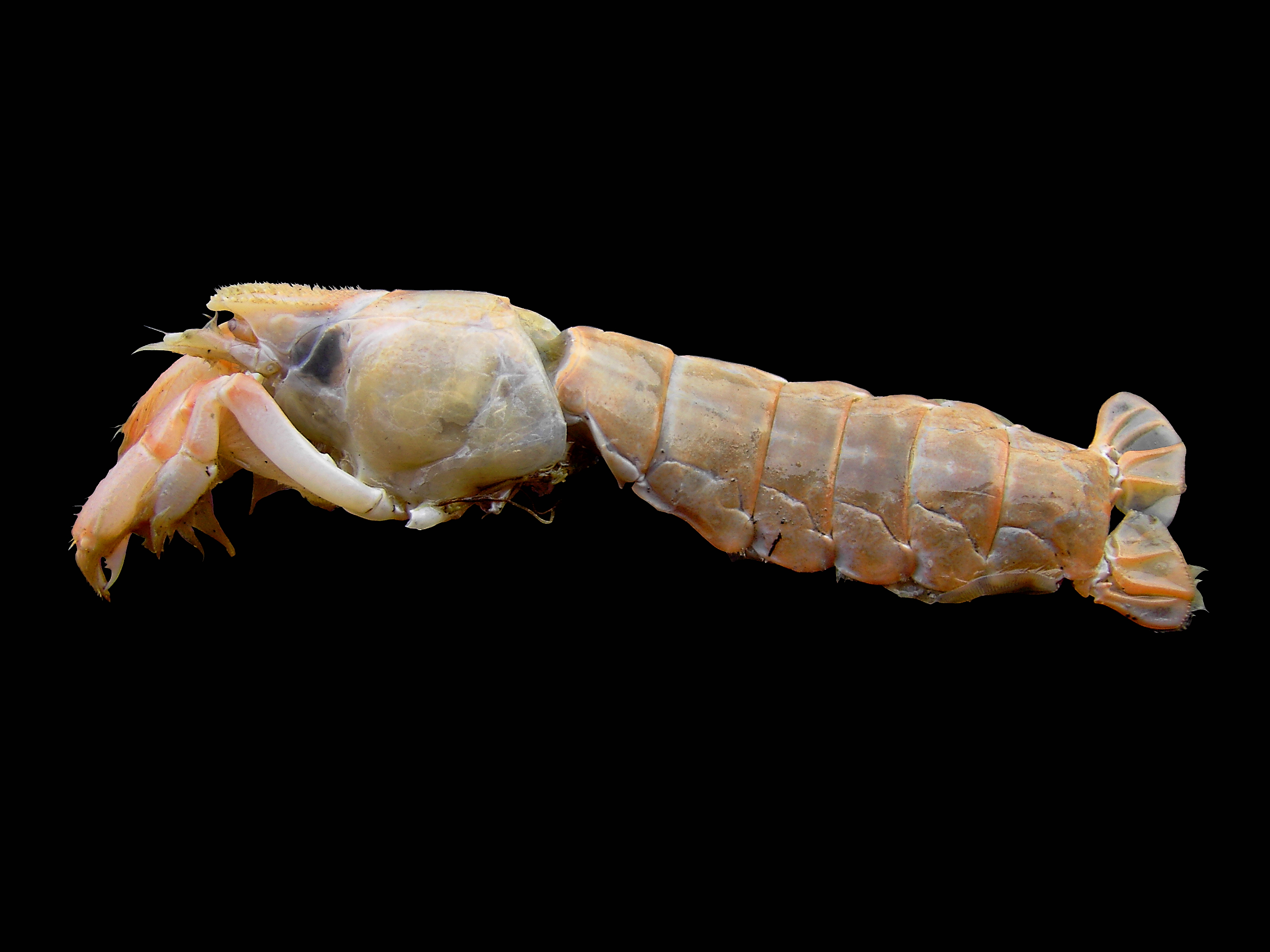
Mud lobster

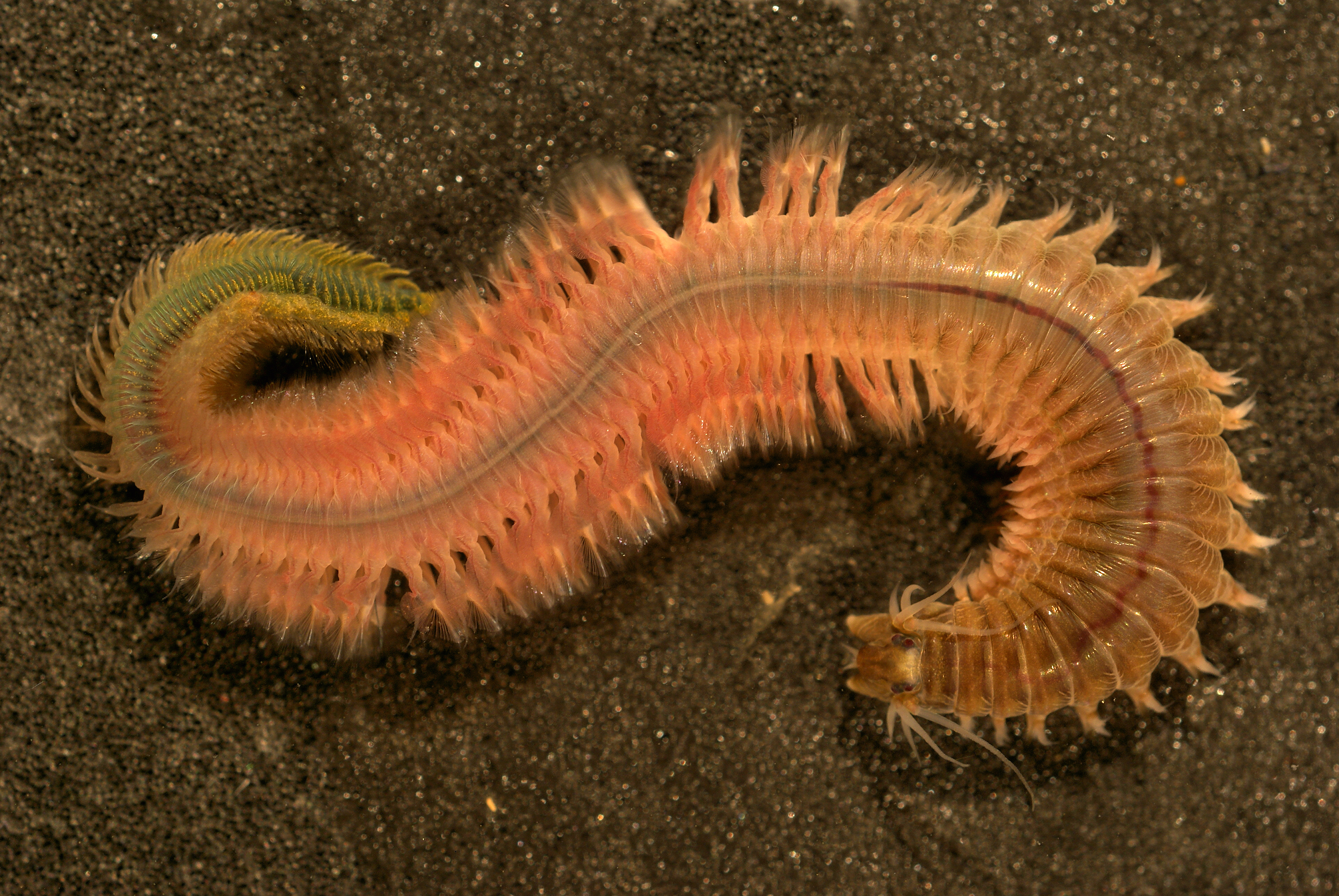
Ragworm

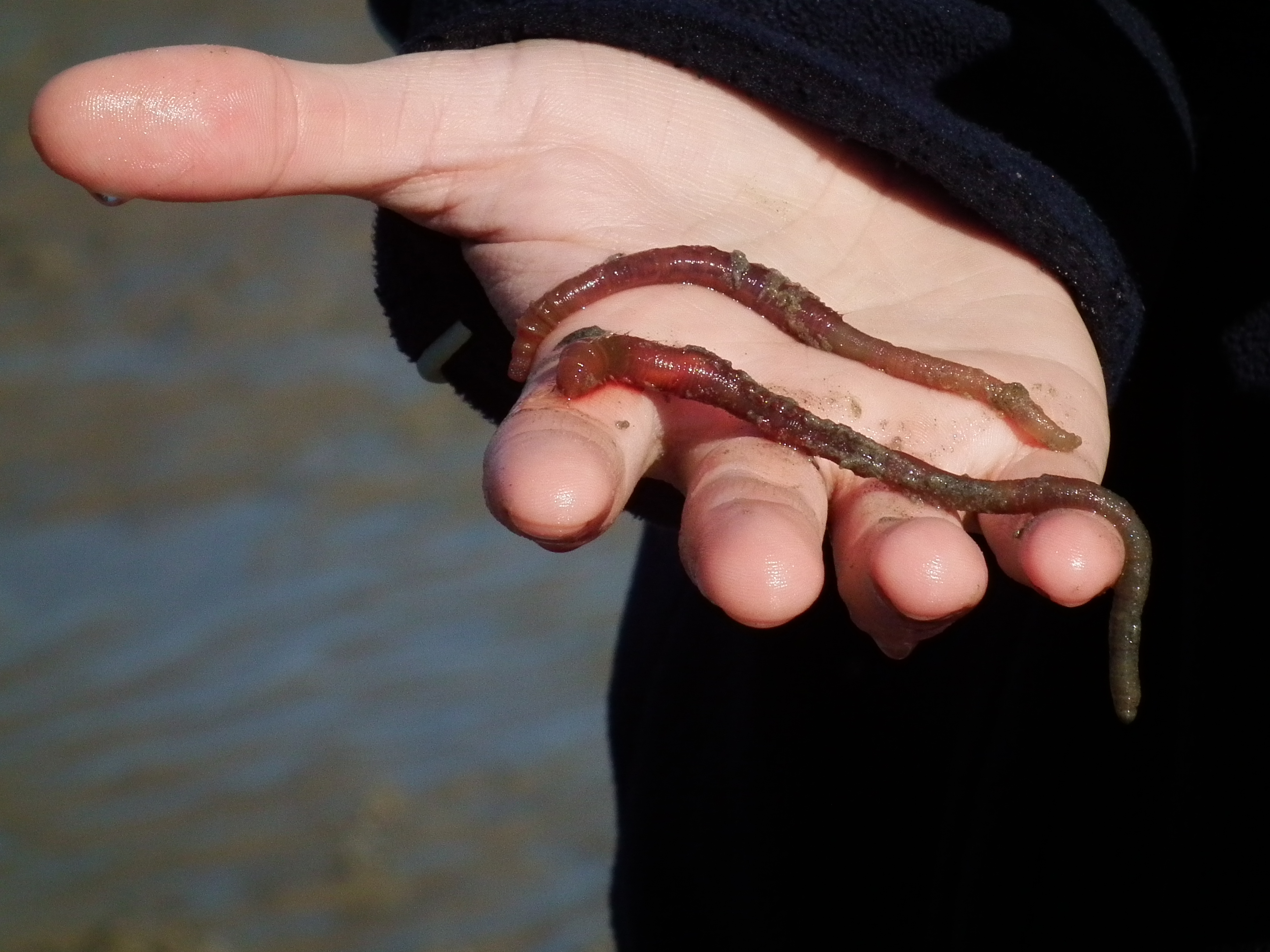
Lugworm
