= Fishing lure =

Artificial fishing bait

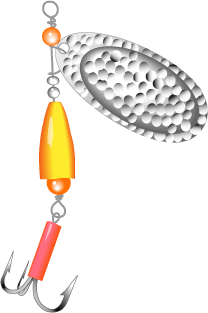
In-line spinner lure with ring, dish, body/weight and hook

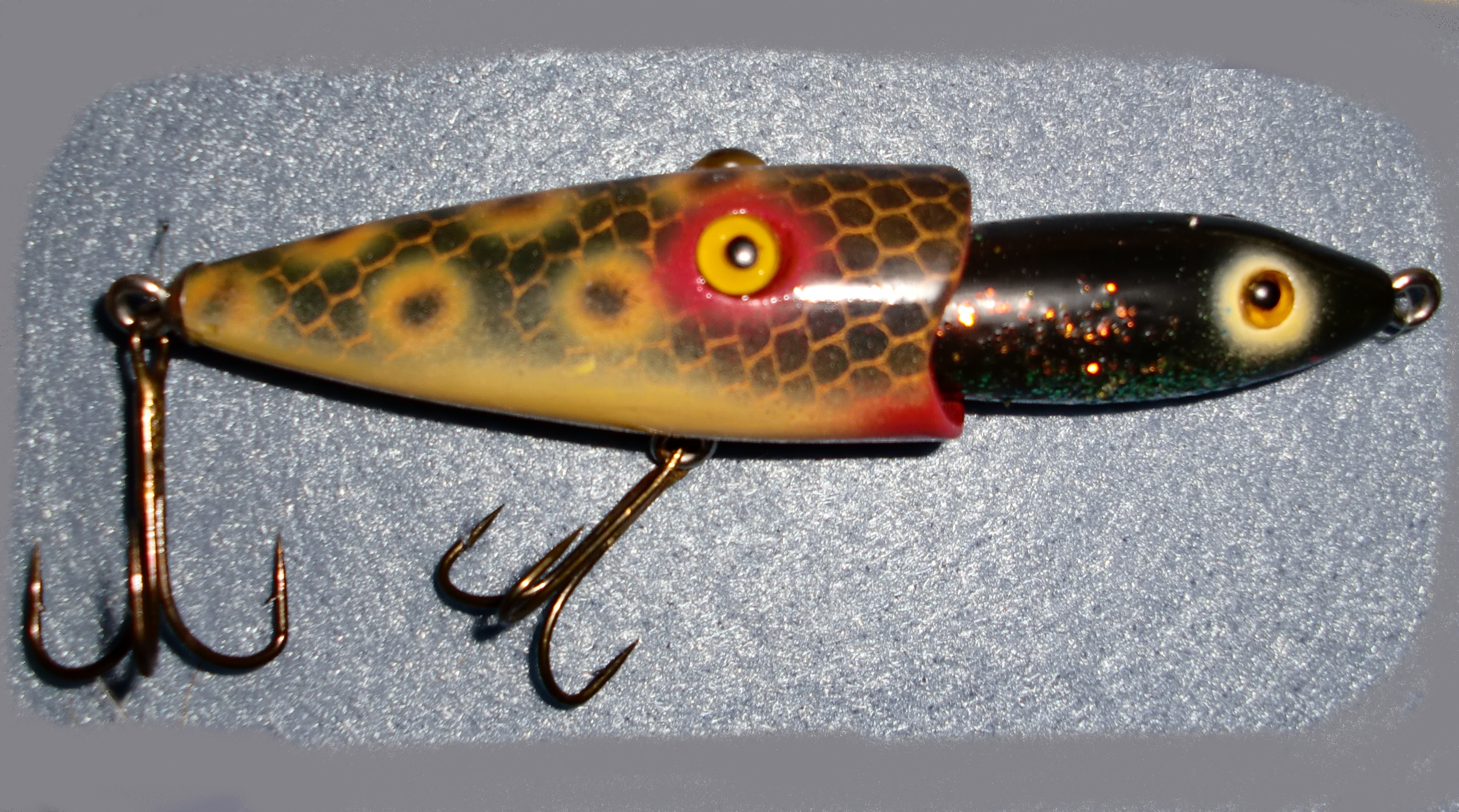
Fishing lures are made in various creative designs like this top-water lure

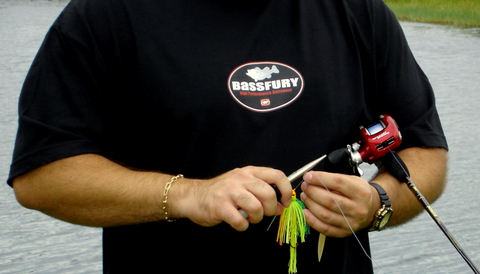
Attaching a bass fishing lure to a fishing line

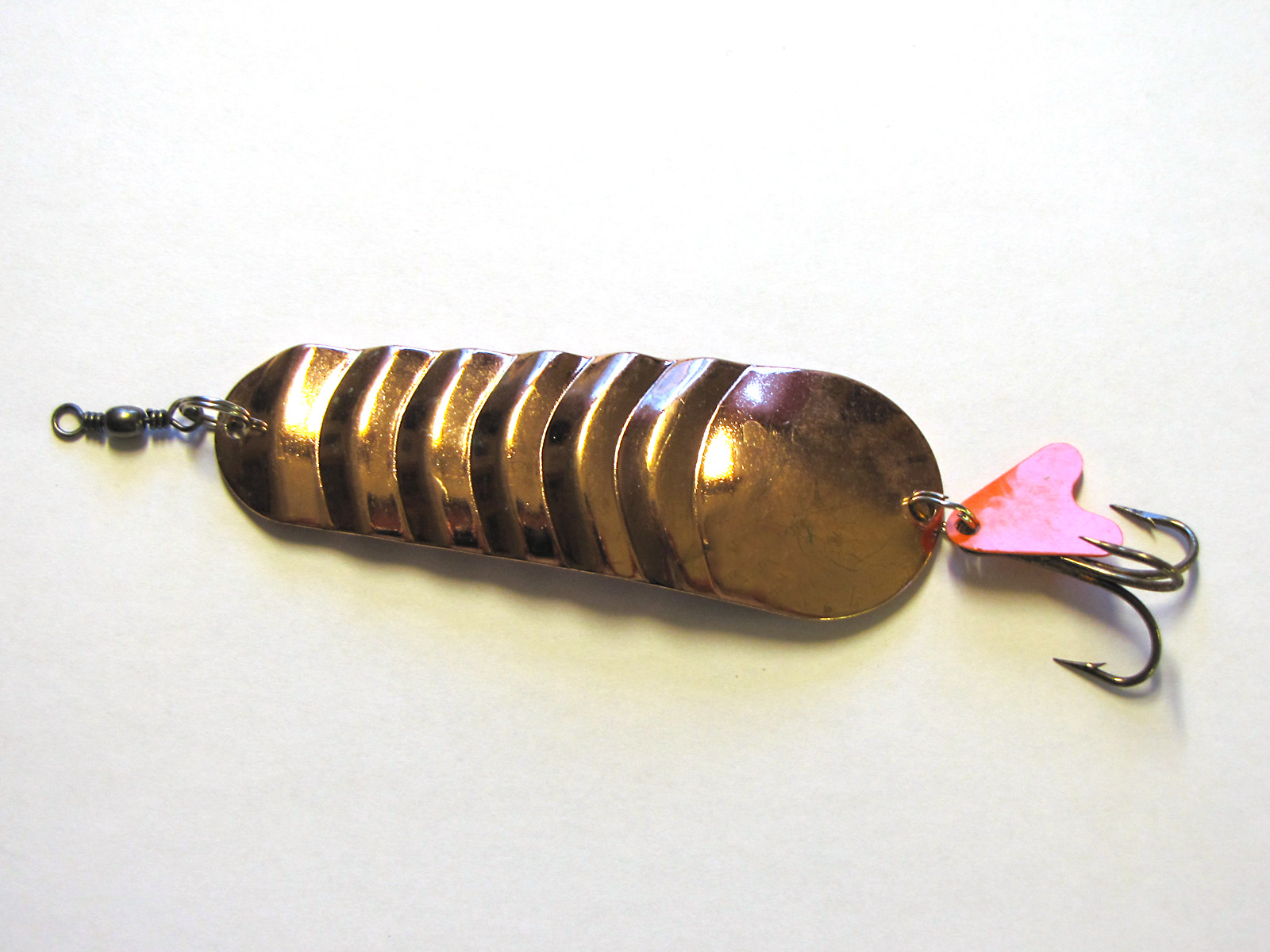
A copper fishing lure

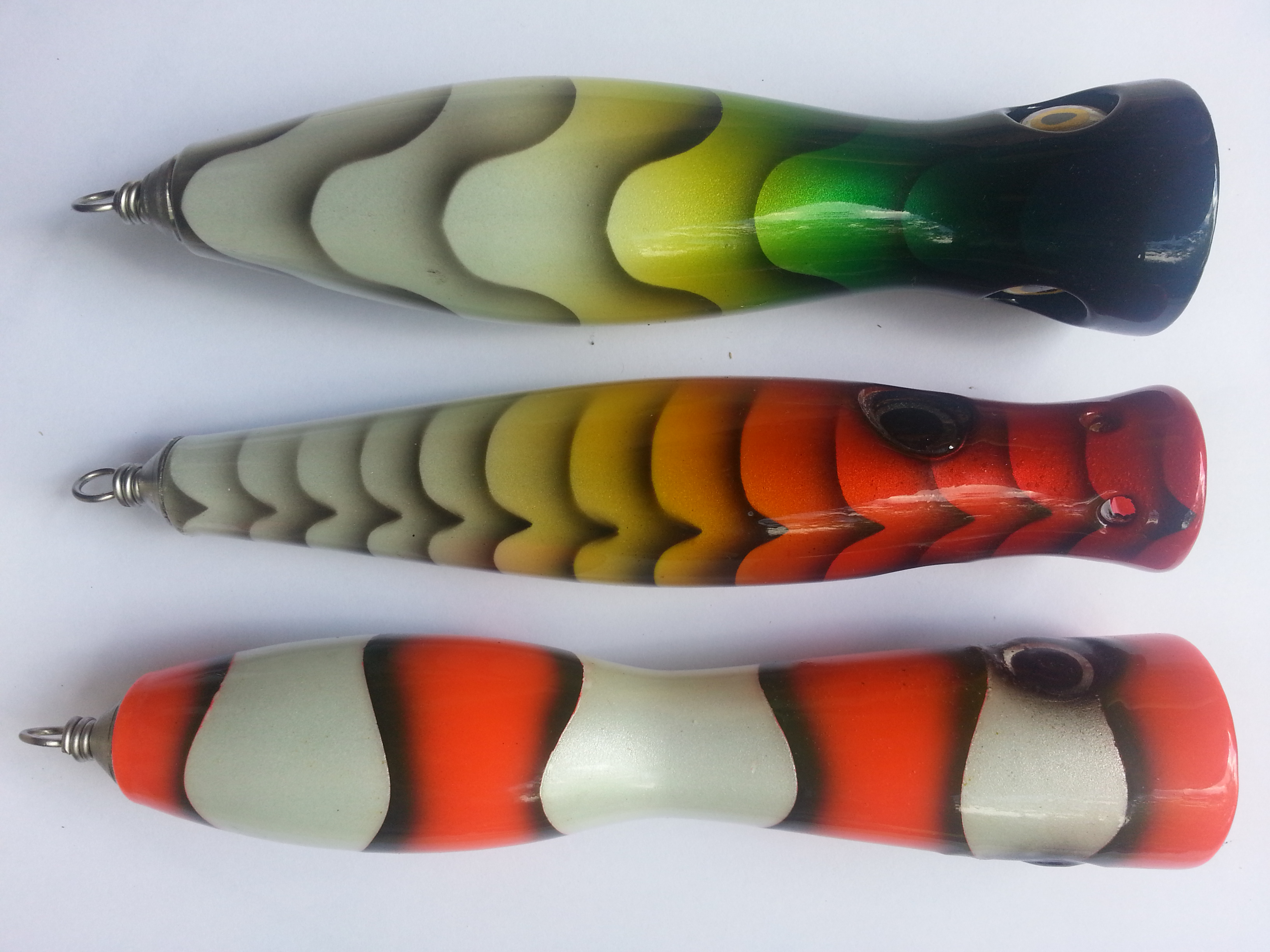
A collection of "popper" lures, a type of surface lure

A fishing lure is any of a broad category of inedible, artificial fishing baits designed to be "fake food" that mimic the appearances of prey and thus attract the attention of predatory fish when angling. Lures come in many shapes and designs that impart different actions and vibrations, which appeal to fish's foraging/territorial instincts and provoke them into striking. Lure color, brightness or the metallic shine/flash alone may also contribute to fish striking a lure, but much of the time even clear hard or soft plastic lures will get struck as well as those made of fur, metal, wood, soft and hard plastic or skirts made of feather, rubber or silicone strands. Lures can be commercially made and purchased from tackle shops, or hand-made by anglers (as in the case of hand-tied fly lures).

Fishing lures are attached to a fishing line, and attached to at least one hook (commonly a treble hook). When lure fishing, the angler use a rod to cast or simply drop the lure to an area of water and then steadily retrieve the lure back, in the hope that lure movements and splashes against the water current will entice nearby fish into striking. Typically, the line is stored on a reel spool and cranked back in retrieval, but in handlining and ice fishing the line might be pulled by hand or tethered directly to a very short rod. Trolling or dragging a lure behind a moving boat is also an effective way to cover water and provoke fish to strike. The retrieve of a lure is as important as the lure cast and there are many types of retrieves, most are tailored to the lure, how it is used and where it is placed, i.e. what depth and/or near objects in the water such as plants or docks. Lures are search tools that find fish apt to strike something they have no clue is dangerous.

== History ==
In early time, angling used predominantly edible baits impaled on hooks made from animal bones or bronze. Archaeological evidence suggests that fishing lures were used at least as far back as 12,000 years ago. The ancient Chinese and Egyptians practiced angling with fishing rods, hooks and lines as early as 2,000 B.C., though most of the first fishermen used handlines. The Roman scholar Claudius Aelianus first described the practice of "fasten red wool... round a hook, and fit on to the wool two feathers which grow under a cock's wattles" by Macedonian anglers on the Astraeus River, an early form of fly fishing, near the end of the 2nd century. The Chinese were the first to make modern-looking fishing line, spun from fine silk, and the use of "wooden fish", likely an early type of surface lure, to catch larger fish such as yellowcheek had been wide spread at least since the Song dynasty (960–1279).

Nordic people have been making spoon lures from the 8th-13th century AD. Most of the lures are made from iron, bronze, copper, and in one case an iron hook soldered to a copper spoon. Many lures had varying shapes and sizes fitting different scenarios like ice fishing and summer fishing. Modern spoon lures appear to have originated in Scandinavia in the late 1700s.

English tackle shops are recorded as selling tin minnows in the middle of the 18th century, and realistic imitations of bugs and grubs made from painted rubber appeared as early as 1800. Early English minnow baits were largely designed to spin as their attracting action, as exemplified by the “Devon”-style lure first produced in quantity by F. Angel of Exeter. The number and variety of artificial baits increased dramatically in the mid- to late 19th century.

The first production lures made in the United States, mostly metal spoons and spinnerbaits, came on the market in the last half of the 19th century. The makers included Julio T. Buel, Riley Haskell, W. D. Chapman and Enterprise Manufacturing Company. Modern fishing plugs were first made commercially in the United States in the early 1900s by firms including Heddon in Michigan and Enterprise Mfg. (Pflueger) in Ohio. Before this time most fishing lures were made by individual craftsman. Commercial-made lures were based on the same ideas that the individual craftsmen were making but on a larger scale.

== Methods ==
The fishing lure is either directly tied to a fishing line (usually a leader) by a knot such as the improved clinch knot or the Palomar knot, or linked to the line via a small split ring (which allows more freedom of motion) and/or a tiny safety pin-like fastener called a "snap", which is usually also connected to a swivel. The fishing line is in turn connected to a fishing reel which cranks in and releases out the line, and is manipulated by the fishing rod via a series of ring guides that impart lateral displacement on the line.

The in-water motion of the lure is generated by winding the line back towards the angler, by sweeping the fishing rod sideways, jigging movements with the rod tip, or by being towed behind a moving boat (trolling). These movements mimic the behaviors of small preys, which draw the attention of larger aquatic predators and fool them into identifying the lure as an easy meal. Exceptions include artificial flies, commonly just called flies by fly fishers, which either float on the water surface, slowly sink or float underwater, and represent some form of drowning insect.

== Types ==
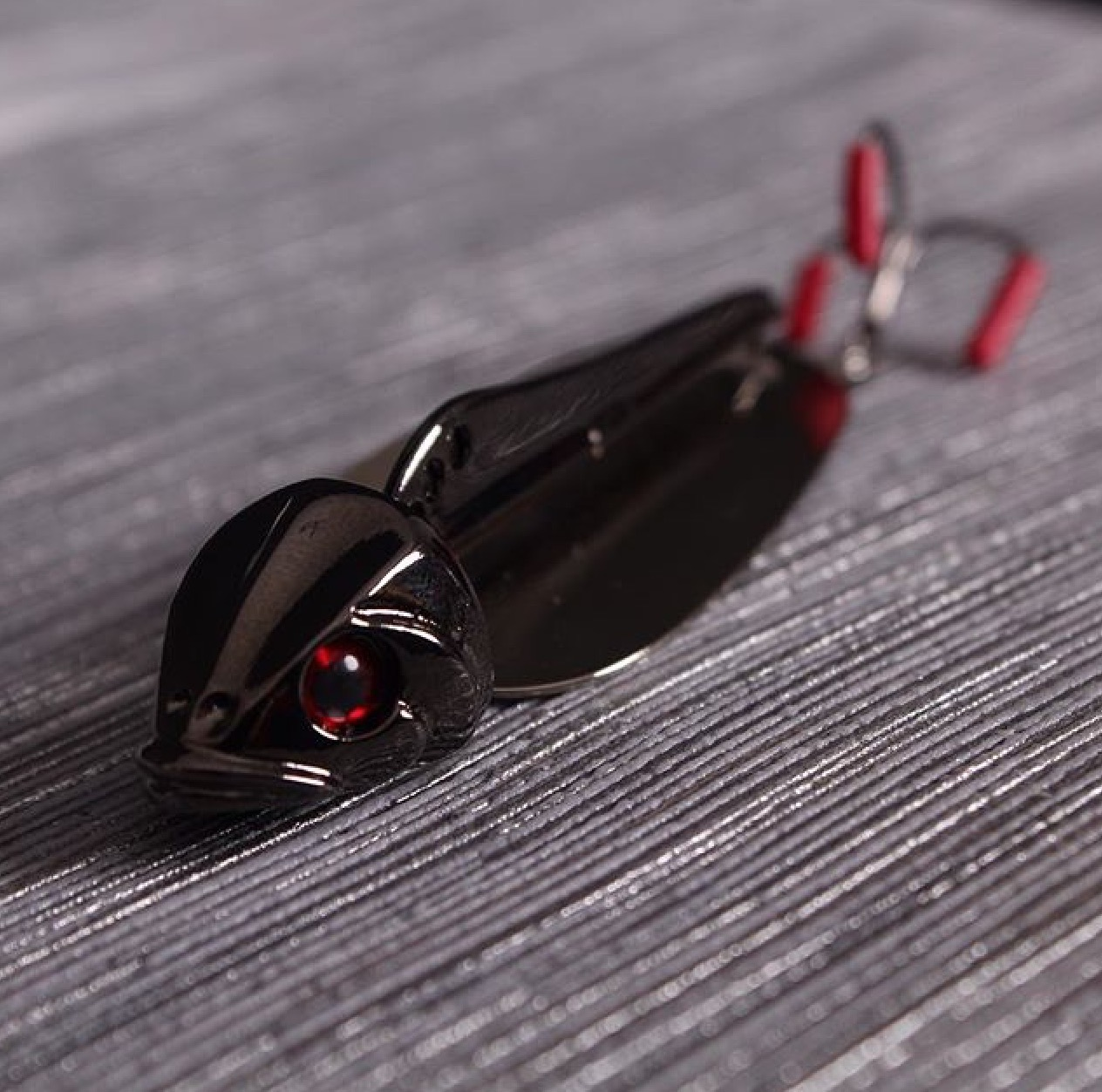
Combined lures

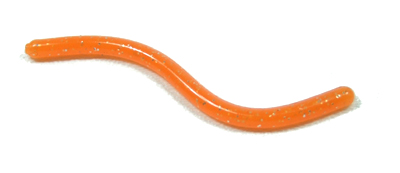
Plastic worm fishing lure

There are many types of fishing lures. Today's modern definition for lures are that they be made of wood, plastic, rubber, metal, cork, and materials like feathers, animal hair, string, tinsel and others. They could also have any number of moving parts or no moving parts. They can be retrieved fast or slow. Some of the lures can be used alone, or with another lure. In most cases they are manufactured to resemble prey for the fish, but they are sometimes engineered to appeal to a fishes' sense of territory, curiosity or aggression. Most lures are made to look like dying, injured, or fast moving fish. They include the following types:

- Artificial flies are designed to resemble all manner of insect prey and are used in fly fishing.
- Combined lures combine properties of several different types of lures.
- Chatterbait, also known as "bladed jig" or "vibrating jig", is an amalgamation of several lure constructs. It has a weighted hook (jighead), a feathered/silicone stranded skirt, and an inline spinner blade. As it is cast, and retrieved, it vibrates under water alerting nearby fish of a potential snack.
- Fish decoy is a type of lure that traditionally was carved to resemble a fish, frog, small rodent, or an insect that lures in fish so they can be speared. They are often used through the ice by fishermen and also by Inuit as part of their diet. The Gichigamiin Indigenous Nations Museum collection includes Native American fish decoys. William Jesse Ramey is considered a vintage master carver of fish decoys, and his work has been featured in museums.
- Jigs are a weighted hook with a lead head opposite the sharp tip. They usually have a minnow or crawfish or even a plastic worm on it to get the fish's attention. Deep water jigs used in saltwater fishing consist of a large metallic weight, which gives the impression of the body of the bait fish, which has a hook attached via a short length of kevlar usually to the top of the jig. Some jigs can be fished in water depths down to 300 meters.
- LED lures have a built in LED and battery to attract fish. They use a flashing or sometimes strobing pattern, using a combination of colors and LEDs.
- Plugs are also known as crankbaits or minnows. These lures look like fish and they are run through the water where they can move in different ways because of instability due to the bib at the front under the head.
- Soft plastic baits are lures made of plastic or rubber designed to look like fish, crabs, squid, worms, lizards, frogs, leeches and other creatures.
- Spinnerbait are pieces of wire that are bent at about a 60- to 90-degree angle with a hook at the bottom and a flashy spinner at the top.
- Spoon lures usually look like a spoon, with a wide rounded end, catching water to force action, and a narrower pointed end at the knot, similar in shape to a concave spearhead. It is shaped to have its center line off center to force the water to act upon it. They flash in the light while wobbling and darting due to their shape, which attracts fish.
- Squid lures or squid jigs are a special type of lures designed to target coleoid cephalopods such as squid and cuttlefish. These lures are usually made to resemble decapod crustaceans such as prawns, and has one or two rings of small, more open-gaped barbless hooks at the tail to better snag the mouth and tentacles of the cephalopods, which is more difficult to catch and anchor with traditional hooks.
- Surface lures are also known as top water lures, poppers and stickbaits. They float and look like fish prey that is on top of the water. They can make a popping, burbling, or even a buzzing sound. It takes a long time to learn how to use this lure effectively. There are specific techniques for using surface lures effectively like "walking" them which gives a natural swimming look.
- Swimbait is a soft plastic or wooden bait/lure that resembles an actual bait fish. Some of these have a tail that makes the lure/bait look like it is swimming when drawn through the water. Such a one made of wood would be hinged in certain places depending on its size.

One advantage of use of lure in general is the reduction in the use of live bait. This contributes to resolving one of the marine environment's more pressing problems; the undermining of marine food webs by overharvesting bait species which tend to occur lower in the food chain. Another advantage of lures is that their use promotes improved survival of fish during catch and release fishing. This is because lures reduce the incidence of deep hooking which has been correlated to fish mortality in many studies.

== Rigs ==
A rig is an established terminal tackle setup that combines at least one hooked lure with one or more line sections, sinkers, bobbers, swivels, decorative beads, and sometimes other lures. A rig might be held by a rod, by hand, or attached to a boat or pier. Some rigs are designed to float near the surface of the water, others are designed to sink to the bottom. Some rigs are designed for trolling. Many rigs are designed especially for catching a single species of fish, but will work well for many different species.

=== Daisy chain ===
A daisy chain is a teaser rig consisting of a "chain" or cluster of plastic lures run without hooks, which mimics a school of forage fish that presents abundant food for predators. The purpose of a daisy chain is to attract pelagic fish to the stern of a boat into the lure "spread", which consists of a number of lures rigged with hooks.

Typically, a daisy chain's mainline is clear monofilament line with crimped-on droppers that connect the lure to the mainline. The last lure can be rigged with a hook or unrigged. The unrigged versions are used as teasers while the hooked versions are connected to a rod and reel. The lures used on a daisy chain are made from cedar plugs, plastic squids, jets, and other soft and/or hard plastic lures.

In some countries (e.g. New Zealand), daisy chains can sometimes refer to a rig which is used to catch baitfish in a similar arrangement to a "flasher rig" or a "sabiki rig"; a series of hooks with a small piece of colourful material/feather/plastic attached to each hook.

== See also ==
- Worm charming
- Bass worms
