= Soft plastic =

Soft plastic may refer to:

- Plastics that may be scrunched up in the hand, as a crude measure for plastic recycling.
- Soft plastic bait, used in fishing.
