= Jigging =

Practice of fishing with a jig

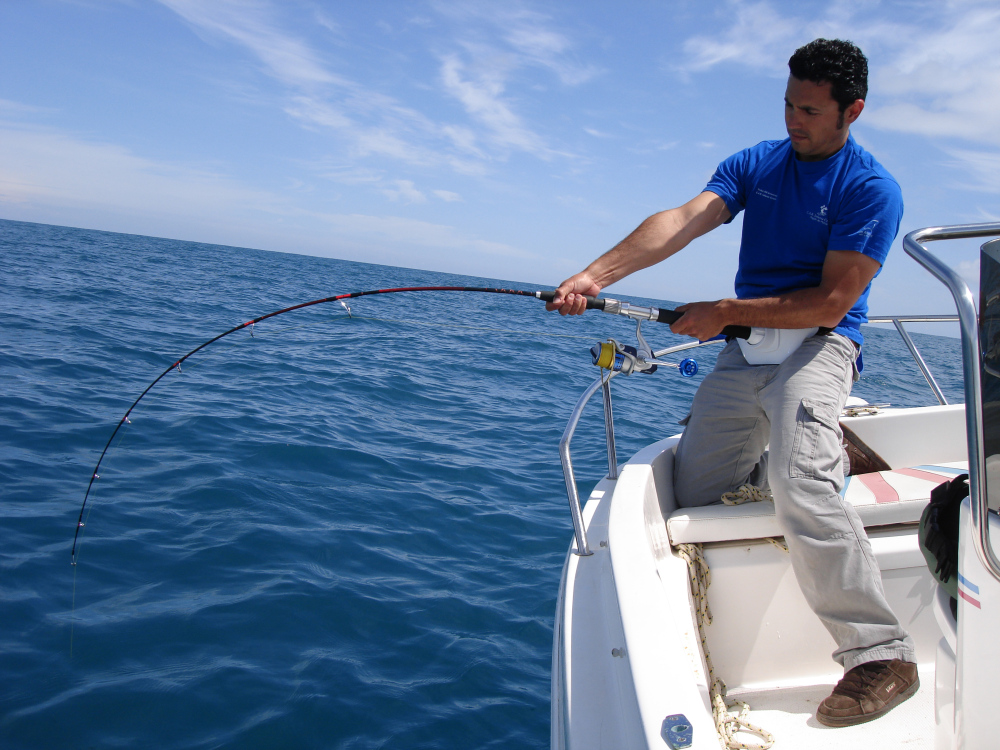
Fisherman jigging with a big fish from his boat

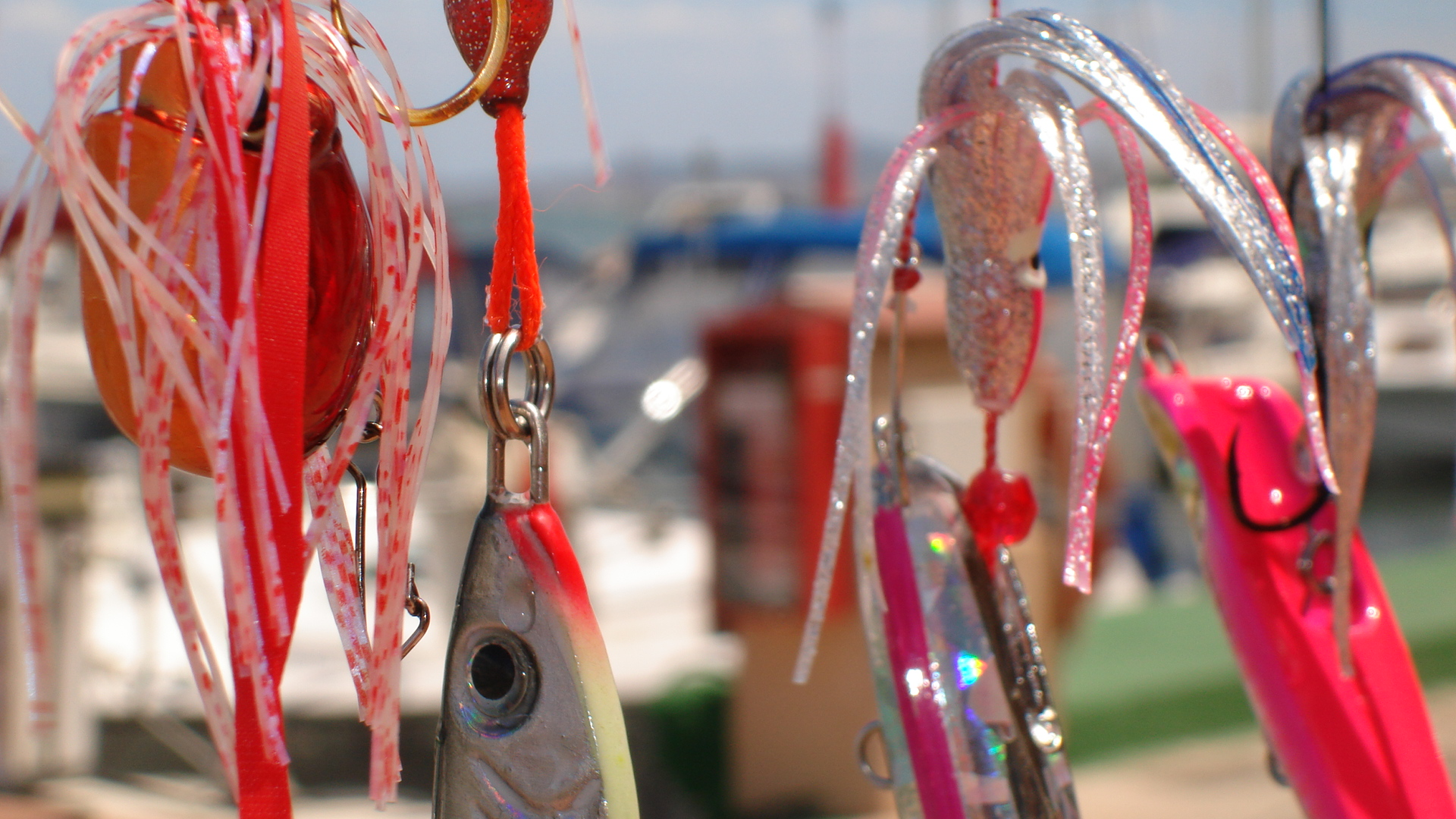
Jigs

Jigging is the practice of fishing with a jig, a type of weighted fishing lure. A jig consists of a heavy metal (typically lead) sinker with an attached fish hook that is usually obscured inside a soft lure or feather-like decorations. Jigs are intended to create a jerky, vertical "jumping" motion to attract fish, as opposed to other common lures like swimbaits, spoons and spinnerbaits, which move through the water more or less horizontally. The jig is very versatile and can be used in both salt and fresh water. Many deeper water fish species are attracted to the lure, which has made it popular among anglers for years.

The jigging technique mainly involves rapid lifting motions of a fishing rod, which jerk the line exert a temporarily upward pull upon the sinking lure. When the target fish is enticed to swallow the lure, the angler then sets the hook to pierce and tether the fish in the mouth. Because the jigs are weighted, a harder-than-usual hookset is often needed to overcome the added weight and provide sufficient momentum to pierce the hook point into the fish mouth. Jigging gears are often involved with the luring of slow moving fish, most commonly during spawning periods. For successful jigging, the jigger needs to use a sensitive rod that is good for feeling a strike, and needs to stay in contact with the lure and get it to where the fish are. Most fish caught by jigs are on or near the bottom.

== Advantages and disadvantages ==
Jigging is a low-cost, low-energy technique that does not necessarily require a bait and its catch can be captured live and hauled into the fishing vessel. This method of fishing can be applied locally as well as at commercial levels.

However, this technique of fishing is labour intensive and time consuming. Jigging also requires technical knowledge of an area so as to determine when and where it can be used, and some jigging machines are relatively expensive for the average person to purchase.

== Jighead ==
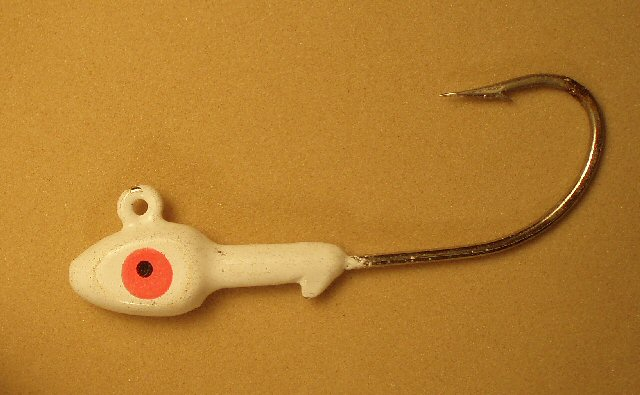
A fish-jighead hook

The weighted "head" of a jig, or jighead, can consist of many different shapes and colors along with different features. The simplest and most common is a round head, but others include fish head-shaped, coned-shaped, cylinder-shaped and hybrid varieties that resemble spoons or spinnerbaits. Most jigheads are integral to a large fish hook, and are most commonly used with soft plastic baits.

The three most popular jighead shapes in bass fishing are the flipping jighead, the football jighead, and the grass jighead. These come in many different weights usually ranging from 1/80 oz (0.35 g) for small freshwater panfishes (e.g. aji) to nearly 1 pound (0.45 kg) for large saltwater groundfishes, and can also be found in a wide array of colors and patterns. The jig hooks also vary, with variances on the hook type, color, angle or build material. Some jigheads even offer a spring latch known as a weed guard to prevent unwanted snagging on aquatic plants/weeds and underwater structures by the hook point.

== Jig body ==
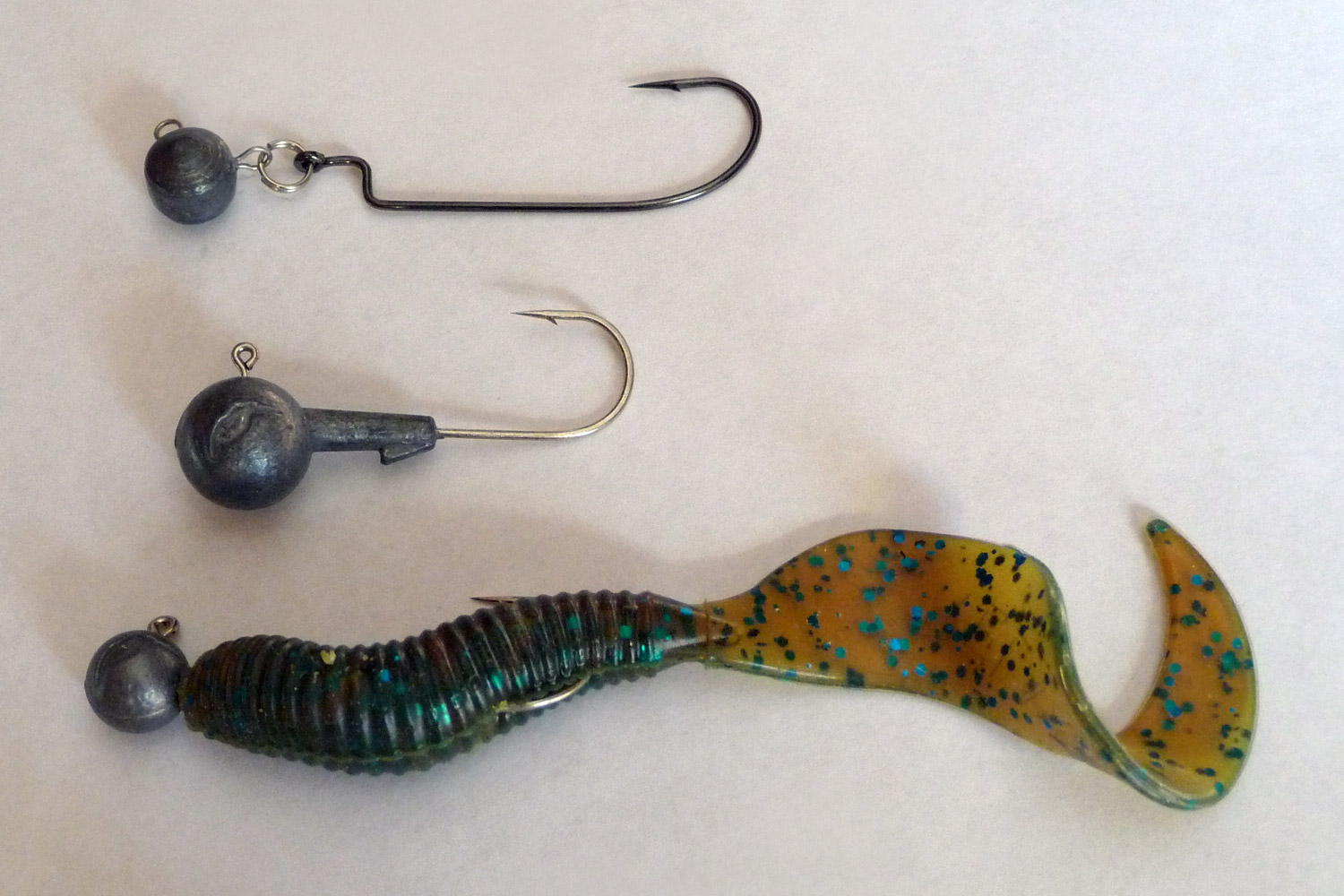
Jig hook with soft plastic lure

There is a wide array of bodies for jigs. The most common is made out of rubber or silicone. These come in many shapes and can resemble a grub, frog, fish, paddle tail, lizard, or different insects. The colors of these can range from bright yellow to a transparent brown with silver and red flakes. Also, during summer months look at colors for the heat such as browns, or blue with black hair. Many others catch fish like smallmouth bass and largemouth bass. Bait such as minnows, leeches or night crawlers can also be used as jig bodies.

Other, more traditional types use dyed or natural whitetail deer tail hair on the outside. Called a bucktail jig, they are widely used in the northern and midwestern United States, where many are still hand tied by anglers.

Other types of materials are also used in constructing jig bodies, such as a chenille wrap on the hook shaft, various feather hackle, hairs or other fur, marabou, flashabou, and other materials. Construction is often similar to the process of fly tying. Some jigs are constructed identically to their artificial fly counterparts, one example a "Wooly Bugger" fly but tied on a jig head.

Bodies can be either brightly colored or subdued. They are often designed to mimic local prey fish or large local insects.

== See also ==
- Angling
- Handlining
