= Fishing popper =

Fishing lure design

- Artificial fly
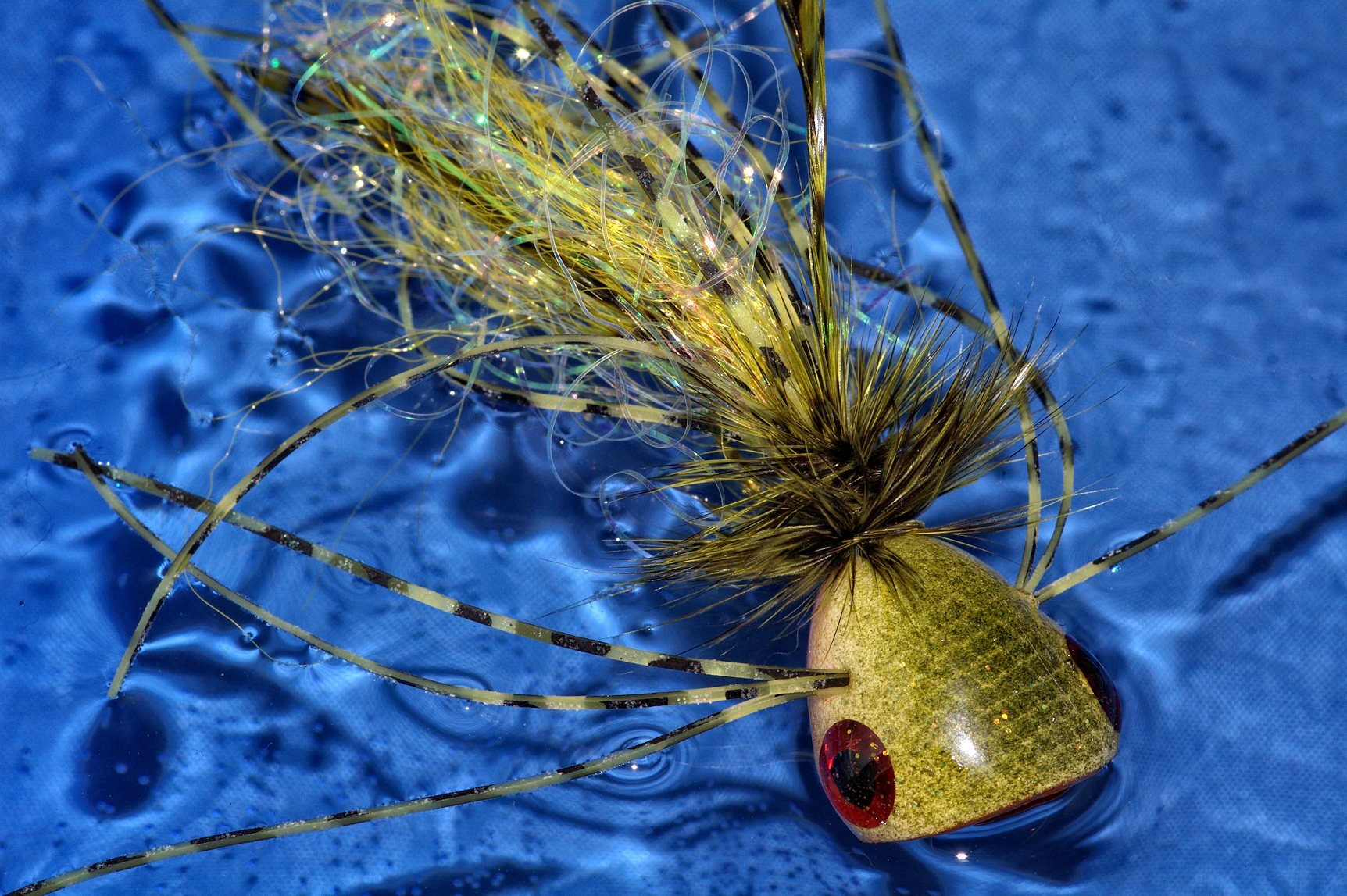
- Type: Popper
- Imitates: Baitfish
- Typical hooks: Popper
- Body: Foam

Uses
- Primary use: Bass
- Other uses: Panfish

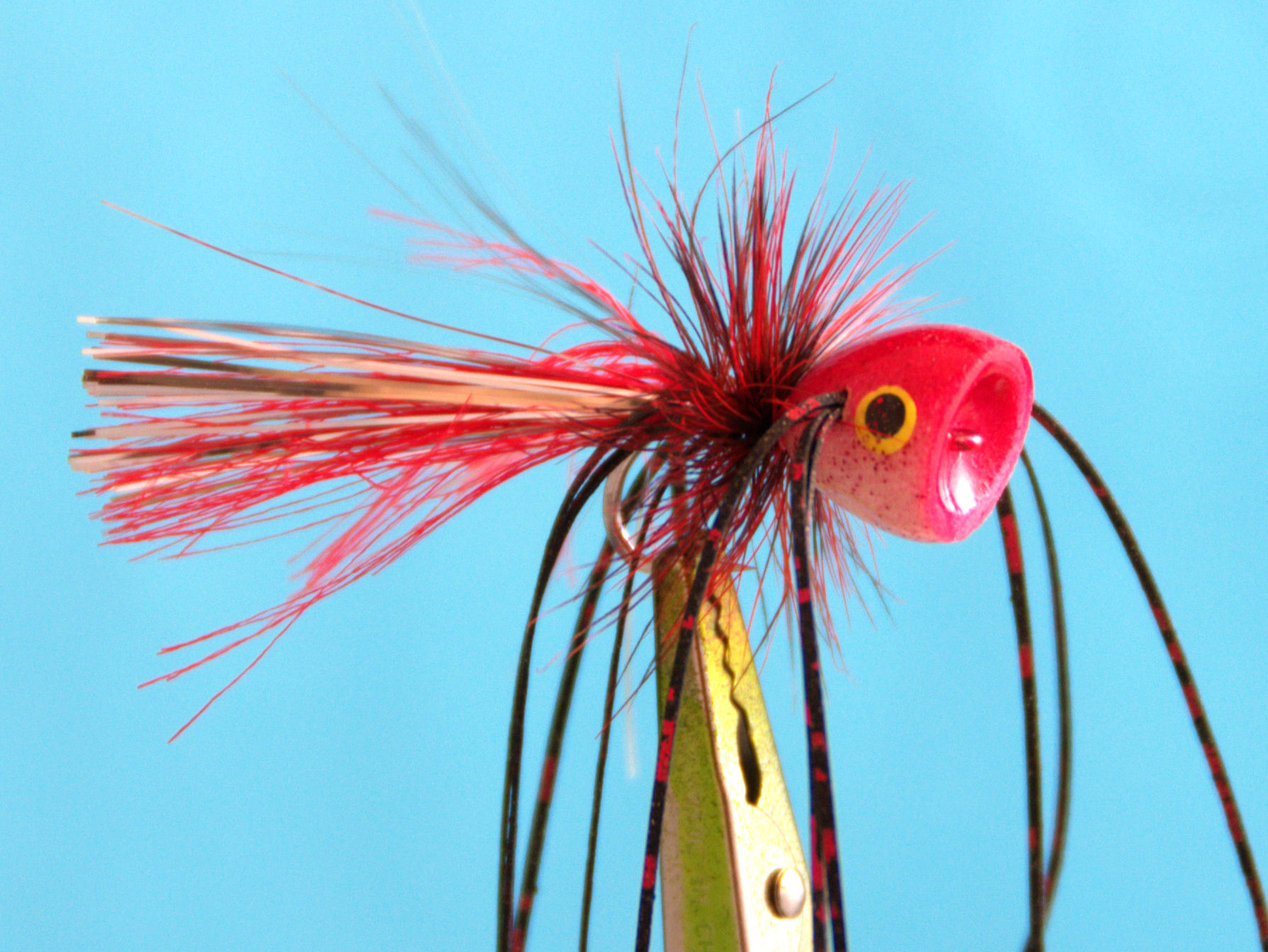
Red popper

The popper is an effective and proven lure designed to move water using a concave or hollowed nose. Poppers aim to simulate any sort of distressed creature that might be moving or struggling on the surface of the water (baitfish, frogs, and insects are the most typical imitations). Poppers are used with spin fishing and fly fishing.

== Origin ==
Originally this timeless lure was crafted from wood and painted or shaped to match the pattern of baitfish. This quickly evolved into more intricate patterns that mimicked a broader scope of the common prey of predatory fish. Along with different imitations, different materials and technologies have been integrated with this classic platform like rattles, soft bodies, and other synthetic body materials. This iconic pattern has been used to create topwater commotion for many decades, but has been most notable for its presence in bass fishing throughout America. Though this pattern is used for many other species of fish the bass is often tightly connected with topwater poppers. Another species often targeted with poppers is the giant trevally (GT). Catching GT on poppers is becoming more and more popular due to the GT's aggressive surface take. Used by fly and conventional anglers alike, this pattern has not failed fishermen since its creation around a century ago.

== Techniques ==
While the popper has been used to catch fish since its arrival, a universal technique on how to properly fish a popper lure exists. The goal is to get a reaction bite from a member of your target species. Therefore you must present the lure in a way that seems natural to the fish. First, you must pick out a suitable popper for the type of fish you are going to be fishing for. Important characteristics include the type of material the popper is made out of, the color of the popper, the size of the popper and the locations of hooks on the lure. Secondly, you must tie the popper to your line properly using a strong fishing knot so that the lure will not slip off or be pulled off by a fish. Next, seek out a target area where you think the desired species of fish will be. Cast your popper out and once it hits the water, let it sit for a few seconds. The sound of the popper hitting the water alone is enough of a disturbance to draw a fish to the sound and induce it to strike at the lure. That is why it is essential to leave your lure in the spot where you cast it for a few seconds before you start to retrieve your line. As you start to retrieve your line, the best technique is to pull the lure towards you, creating sound and motion in the water, then stop abruptly, letting the popper sit in the water while you retrieve the slack line. You will want to continue this intermittent retrieval until the popper nears the rod. You can then cast the lure back out and repeat the retrieval technique. Once a fish strikes at the popper, you should not immediately yank your rod back to try to set the hook. It is essential to let the fish take the popper underwater prior to setting the hook so that you do not pull the popper out of its mouth. This will ultimately increase your hook-up ratio.

== See also ==
- Surface lure
- Jalapeño popper
- Fly tying
