= Surface lure =

Fishing lure

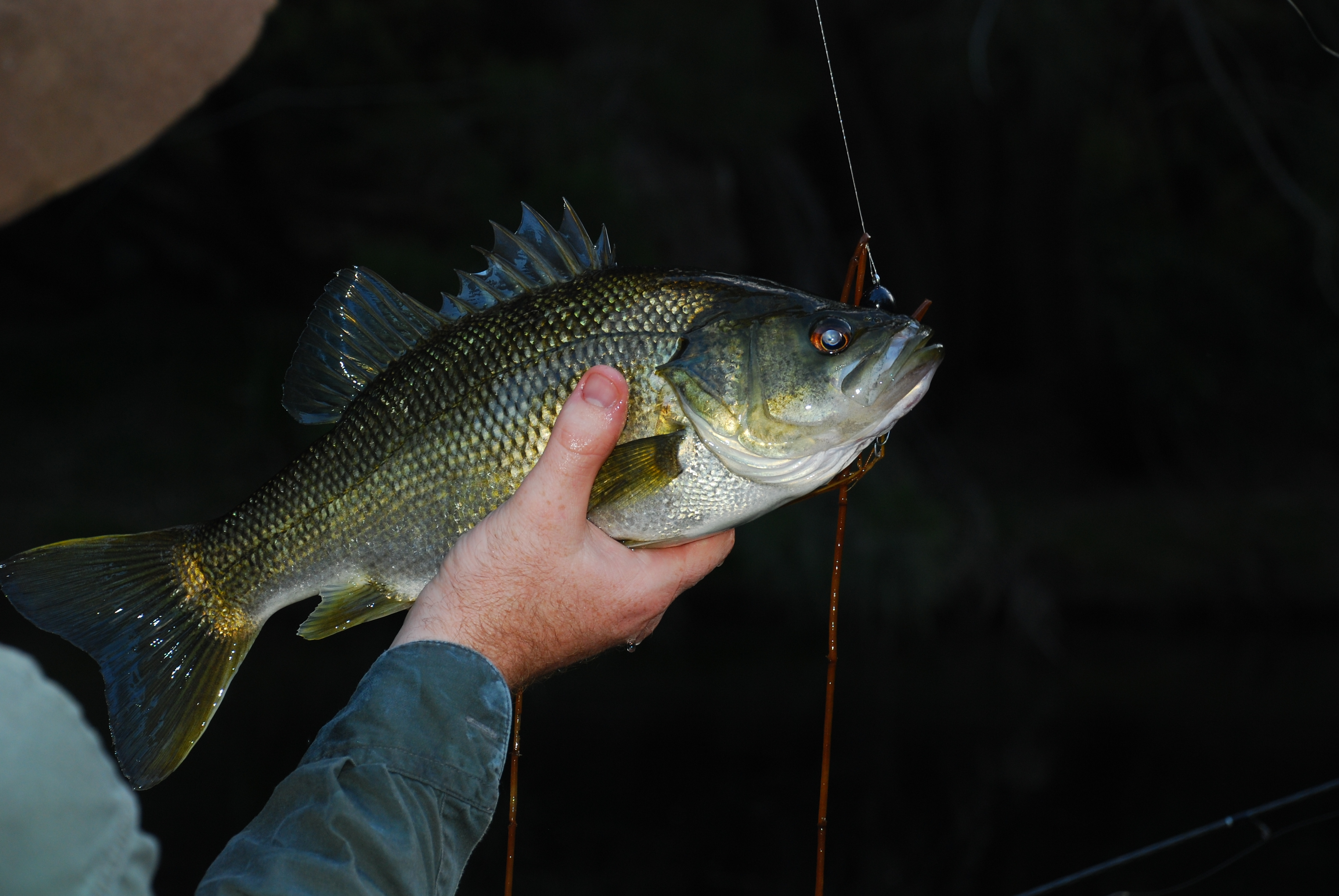
This fine Australian bass was caught and released on a fizzer equipped with barbless hooks.

A surface lure or topwater lure is a diverse class of fishing lure designed to attract predatory fish through commotions produced at (or immediately below) the water surface, imitating preys of interest swimming at the surface such as injured baitfish, frogs, wading mice, lizards and water snakes, drowning insects (dragonflies, cicadas, moths, etc.) and dabbling ducklings. These lures are preferred by some anglers due to the belief that they attract larger-than-average fish (who tend to be more territorial and unafraid of venturing out and away from underwater hidings), and from the added excitement of actually seeing the sudden splashes created by fish aggressively breaching the surface to strike the lure, in some instances even clearly seeing the fish stalking the lure before striking.

Like other types of fishing lures, topwater lures produce enticing actions through passive movements when being reeled through water. They come in several different shapes and dynamic styles, and most topwater lures have lighter specific gravity than water and tend to float on or just below the surface, but others are sinking (heavier than water) lures that must be reeled rapidly upwards towards the surface to produce the intended action.

== Types ==
=== Walking baits ===
Walking baits or walkers, also called stickbaits, pencils or spooks, are surface lures that tend to simply slide across the water surface in a serpentine fashion, which resembles a baitfish swimming close to the surface. These lures are popular for both fresh and saltwater fishing and come in a large range of sizes. Walkers are often streamlined or cigar-shaped, and are usually equipped with two or three treble hooks. Some walkers have internal roller balls that rattle to better draw in fish from farther away, and may include a blunted or even concave front end to splash more water during retrieval. Others may have designs that emphasise more on tail action to create a greater propagating wake that entice fish to pursue, and these have been unofficially named wakebaits.

Walking baits are so-named as they are typically retrieved using a special cadence called "walking the dog", in which the angler retrieves the lure using a combination of rod twitches and reeling. They are often cast into schools of actively feeding fish and retrieved quickly to imitate a fleeing baitfish. Though mostly used to imitate baitfish, some walking baits are patterned to resemble frogs, insects, or snakes. Popular game fish such as largemouth bass have been known to come up from deep water to attack these lures.

=== Crawlers ===
Crawlers or waddlers get their action from a scooped metal dish attached to the front of the lure body, which causes the lure to wriggle and splash in a movement reminiscent of a front crawl. Others are designed with a pair of rigid "wings" that flatten out when the lures splash down and paddle water like a butterfly stroke.

This style of lure more closely resembles a small terrestrial animal struggling to swim afloat at the water's surface, such as a winged insect, small mice or bird. In most cases, these lures a retrieved at a slow and steady pace. These are a popular style of lure for night fishing. In some cases, these lures may be equipped with rattles or propellers for additional action.

=== Poppers ===
Poppers or chuggers get their action from a cupped face carved or molded into the front of the lure body, which funnels water towards its tail and produces turbulent bubbles and wakes behind it to imitate an injured or drowning prey. These are among the oldest types of fishing lure and come in designs suited for both conventional angling and fly fishing gear. Very large models are used for targeting saltwater species.

Poppers are often cast to isolated cover, such as a fallen tree or patch of weeds. The traditional retrieve is to wait for the ripples to disappear and then to slowly "pop" the lure by twitching the rod tip, giving pauses in between lasting up to several seconds. They can also be cast to more open areas and worked back more rapidly. Some models can also be "walked" much like a walking bait.

=== Propeller baits ===
Propeller baits or ploppers are floating lures that have one or more small propellers made of metal or hard plastic, which spins passively with flow and splashes water to attract fish. Some models have a single propeller on the back, while others may have propellers on the front and back.

Depending on the model, prop baits may be retrieved at a steady pace or with a pause and twitch retrieve. They usually are designed to resemble an injured baitfish.

=== Buzzbaits ===
Buzzbaits are a type of topwater lure that does not actively float. They consist of a jighead with an attached wire that carries a propeller blade made of metal or plastic, along with a single hook. While most buzzbaits have two-bladed props, models with three or four blades also exist. Some have more than one prop. Lures with more blades or props can be retrieved more slowly. Buzzbaits attract fish through the commotion caused by the prop rotation, as well as the metallic squeaking sound. Some models also feature an extra clacker blade that the prop strikes against, producing a much louder noise that can sometimes attract fish from further away.

These lures are typically cast near cover and are retrieved as soon as they hit the water to prevent them from sinking. Since they must be retrieved at a steady pace, buzzbaits can be used to cover water quickly and efficiently. Buzzbaits are often fitted with a soft plastic trailer imitating a frog or baitfish to increase action and attraction. Other anglers prefer to add a trailer hook to increase the chances of a hookup.

== Appeal ==
Large fish striking a surface lure may produce a sudden and audible splash. This method is often described as particularly engaging due to the abrupt visual and auditory nature of the strike.

== See also ==
- Spinnerbait
