= Bass worms =

Artificial fishing lure

A bass worm is an artificial fishing lure which comes in a variety of different colors and body types and is usually scented with a salty, garlic residue. Bass worms are more effective than other rubber worms primarily because bass are attracted to a particular worm depending on the environment in which they are being used.

== Grub Worm ==
The grub is meant to resemble that of the larvae that appear naturally all around the world. Most artificial grubs have a curly tail on the end of a fat body that flaps rapidly when being pulled through the water. This action mimics the true movement of a living worm and helps to entice a bass to strike. These worms vary anywhere from 2 to 4 inches (51 to 102 mm) in length.

== Ringworm ==
The ringworm has somewhat of a nightcrawler profile, equipped with a smooth, aerodynamic nose and a body that has circular ridges (or rings) that continue down the body until reaching a flat or sometimes curly tail. These worms are typically 4 to 6 inches (100 to 150 mm) in length.

== Ribbontail Worms ==
These worms tend to range between 7 and 10 inches (180 and 250 mm) in length; the majority of which is the tail that is sinuously twisted so it can displace water while causing as much visual pleasure to the bass as possible. The front of the body accounts for about 3 inches (76 mm) of the overall length and is cylindrical in shape, sometimes having circular rings.

== Floating Worms ==
Floating worms have the nightcrawler profile but instead of staying submerged, these baits hover near the surface. These worms work well for fishing through heavy cover and over grass beds where topwater action is essential. These worms tend to be 6 to 8 inches (150 to 200 mm) in length.

Usually come either with or without the "seed." The watermelon seed lures are speckled with black dots.
