= Spoon lure =

Fishing tool

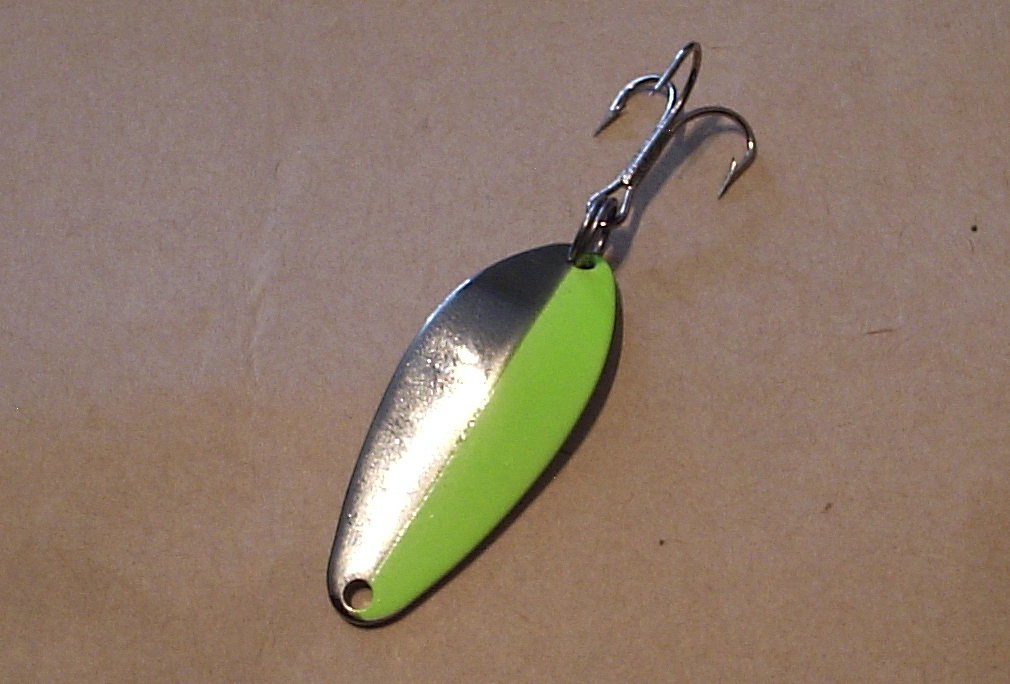
A typical spoon lure, with a treble hook

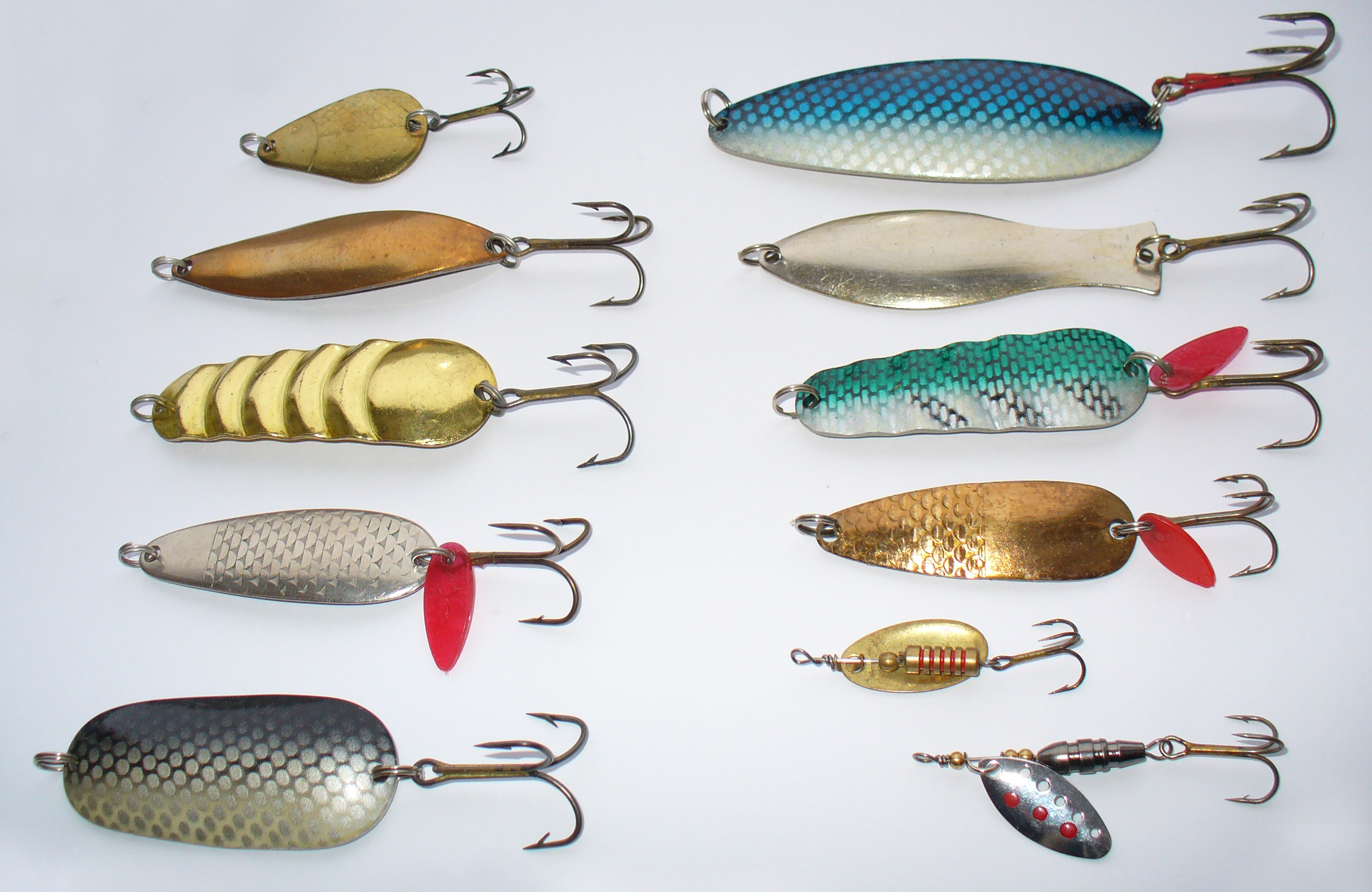
A collection of spoon lures, some with spinner blades

In sport fishing, a spoon lure is a fishing lure usually made of lustrous metal and with an oblong, usually concave shape like the bowl of a spoon. The spoon lure is mainly used to attract predatory fish by specular reflection of light, as well as the turbulences it creates when moving in water.

The design of the spoon lure is simple: the oblong, concave blade shape of the spoon will cause it to wabble randomly when towed or sinking through water, creating sparkles of light reflection that resemble those of a swimming bait fish's scales when looking from afar. The spoon wabbling also stirs up turbulences that can entice the fish to stalk and strike it. Fish normally use their lateral line system to follow the vortices produced by fleeing prey, and the oscillating movements of the spoon lure can imitate these. Different color variations and materials can be added to the classic spoon lure may also help catch fish. Silver- or gold-plated or dyed finishes can give the lure a more vibrant or brilliant appearance. Most spoon lures have at least one hook at the end, which tethers the fish's mouth when the fish swallows the spoon.

While the basic principle of design has stayed the same over the years, application and use have changed somewhat. In its beginning, the spoon was used simply to cast and retrieve. However, as trolling motors have become popular on most fishing boats, a new version of the classic was invented. This new breed of lure was nothing more than a duplicate of the traditional casting spoon, but made with thinner material. Using a trolling motor, fishermen could cover a wider expanse of water, increasing the chances for a successful day. Using split shots or other forms of weights, fishermen could easily zero into their fishing lures' depth while running at the proper speed. Armed with the ability to cover more area, average fishermen could take their spoon lures to any body of water, without full knowledge of the underwater geography that is key to catching some species of fish. The regular casting spoon (heavier version) is used primarily by fishermen who already know the water and what lies beneath. The angler, anchoring the boat 10 to 20 feet behind the area where the fish are believed to be, can cast the spoon beyond this point and retrieve through the given strike zone.
