= Spinnerbait =

Fishing lure

An In-Line Spinnerbait

A spinnerbait or spinner is any one of a family of hybrid fishing lures that combines the designs of a swimbait with one or more spoon lure blades. Spinnerbaits get the name from the action of the metallic blades, which passively revolve around the attachment point like a spinning propeller when the lure is in motion, creating varying degrees of vibration and flashing that mimic small fish or other preys of interest to large predatory fishes. The two most popular types of spinnerbaits are the in-line spinner and safety pin spinnerbait, though others such as the tail spinner also exist. Spinnerbaits are used principally for catching freshwater fishes such as perch, pike and bass.

== Mode of operation ==
Spinnerbaits attract predatory fish primarily by creating significant amount of turbulence, noise and flashing reflections with the spinning blade. The turbulence waves, in particular, provoke the fish's lateral line system, a special tactile sensory organ that enables fish to detect vibrations transmitted through the water and "feel" objects at a distance. Most fish have well-developed lateral lines and can detect the slightest disturbance in water around it, which may warn fish of approaching dangers, signal the presence of territorial intruders, or indicate the potential location of prey.

Spinnerbait blades also functions as individual spoon lures, mimic prey and stimulate other fish senses by creating flashes (sight) and noises (hearing) that can be detected quite far away in clear, calm water conditions.

=== Blade designs ===
The most important part of any spinnerbait next to the hook is the blade. There are several different shapes, and numerous sizes, with colors ranging from gold, silver, and bronze, to painted blades with a myriad of different colors and patterns. The two main characteristics of a spinnerbait blade are flash (available light reflecting off the blade as it moves) and vibration (the 'thump' of the blade as it spins). Some blade designs produce more vibration, while other designs produce more flash. Each blade applies to different scenarios, making it crucial to properly arm and prepare yourself for multiple weather conditions. The most prominent blade types include the following:

- Colorado blade: A round, spoon-shaped blade, the Colorado blade is designed for maximum vibration, its broad shape and parabolic cross-section producing a deep, heavy vibration that can be detected by fish at long distances via their lateral line, and by the angler through the rod. It is often favored for use in situations where the fish cannot see the lure very well, such as in murky water or at night. It also applies to when you're fishing deeper waters, allowing you to feel the blades movement throughout your rod.
- Willowleaf blade: A long, narrow blade shaped like the foliage it is named after, the Willowleaf has an almost flat cross-section, and stresses flash over vibration, having very little vibration at all. It has the most flash out of all blade types, therefore, making it perfect for imitating baitfish. It is most successful during the summer and fall seasons when there is ample visibility and bass are actively feeding. The flash from the blade and clear waters allow prey to easily see it and be enticed. A popular safety-pin blade setup is to have a Willowleaf blade with a Colorado blade mounted just ahead of it on the frame in a 'tandem' configuration.
- Indiana blade: This blade is a hybrid of the Willowleaf and Colorado blades, sharing design features of both, such as the narrow width of the Willowleaf and the rounded shape of the Colorado, with a curved cross-section halfway between the two. This blade is highly versatile, providing a middle ground between the extremes offered by the other two. It is the primary blade type used on most in-line spinners. Its name derives from the fact that it was introduced and popularized by an Indiana spinnerbait manufacturer, Hildebrandt.
- Oklahoma blade: This blade, also referred to as turtleback, Olympic, or mag willow, is a shortened, rounded variant of the Willowleaf blade. In terms of vibration and speed of rotation, it falls between the Colorado and Indiana blades. For heavily pressured waters, this blade creates a sonic signature that is unlike the three more common blade types, and therefore it is more likely to attract attention from predatory fish.

== Types ==
=== In-line spinner ===
The in-line spinner is named for the fact that a metal blade revolves around a central axis (a wire), which may be attached by a clevis (a c-shaped metal piece with holes that accommodates the wire) or by itself. Most in-line spinners have metal weights rigged behind the spinning blade and beads or brass hardware that separates the two for frictionless spinning. Due to the fact that the spinning blade cause the whole bait to rotate, line twist builds that creates line problems and tangles. Swivels are used to solve the problem of twist.

==== The blade factor ====
As with all spinner type baits, various shapes of blades are used depending on many factors. Speed of retrieve is a major consideration because different blade designs revolve at different speeds. For example, the elongated willow leaf design requires the most speed to start and maintain the spin. The broader and more circular Colorado blade requires less speed and a slower retrieve to maintain spin. An Indiana blade falls somewhere in between. Vibration is higher with broader blades, less with streamlined blades, but flash depends more on blade size, texture and color than on design.

A hammered nickel (pock-marked) blade has the most flash in that the dimpling reflects light at more angles than a smooth polished blade. Painted blades can have more or less flash depending on color and patterns, but always less flash than silver finishes under a sunny sky and have more flash under low light conditions. Under low light conditions fluorescent colored blades stand out over regular colors or polished metal.

==== Treble or single hook dressing ====
The treble hook can be dressed or not, depending on personal preferences of bait profile and action. By itself, the flash and maybe the vibration are the only attractors. But anytime you add something to a bait, you change its appearance and action and may have to alter presentation.

The simplest hook dressings have been hair or feather and add a fluttering tail action that is imparted by blade vibration. These materials come in many colors, though black or white have been traditional attractors. Flashy artificial materials such as Flashabou, add a fluttering flash in different incandescent or solid flash colors, increasing the total flash profile of the in-line.

Many believe that a dressed treble presents a body/target that follows the flash ahead of it and that it may entice more strikes than a bare treble hook. For this reason, some companies have added soft plastic dressings to the hook to change the appearance and action of the bait and these are routinely called trailers. Soft plastic trailers have traditionally been curly tailed grubs and come in any color desired, as well as either single tail, double tails or quadratails. The speed of retrieve will always depend first on the blade size and design, but trailers provide lift for any spinner type bait, allowing a slightly lower retrieve speed. The weight material on the wire behind the spinning blade and also been made to look like a fish or like traditional minnow type baits such as the Rapala.

In-line spinners have limitations such as not being good for heavy weeds or where very slow or vertical presentations are required. In-lines are usually considered swimming, horizontal baits and may be cast or trolled behind a slow moving boat. In-lines come in all sizes: small trout and panfish sizes to musky and salmon sizes up to six inches in length. In-line spinners are a multispecies bait that have a time and place in anyone's tackle box.

=== Safety pin or overhead arm spinnerbait ===
Safety Pin Spinnerbait with a tandem blade configuration; a Colorado blade mounted ahead of an Indiana blade.

Invented in 1951 and first manufactured in St. Louis, Missouri, the "safety-pin" or overhead blade style spinnerbait is probably the most popular spinnerbait design among bass, northern pike, and redfish anglers in the USA. Its most prominent feature is a wire frame that is bent roughly 90 degrees and embedded at its base in a bullet-, cone-, or arrowhead-shaped lead body with a single hook behind it.

==== Retrieval ====
One advantage of safety-pin spinnerbaits is that they allow the angler to cover the entire water column. Often, safety-pin style spinnerbaits are retrieved within sight and just below the surface at a steady rate. Slow-rolling a spinnerbait is similar to the presentation of a skirted jig in that the lure remains in contact with the bottom throughout the retrieve. If fished as a "drop-bait," the main blade helicopters above the weighted body and hook as the bait falls, thus simulating a dying minnow. Most times the strike occurs as the horizontal retrieve is resumed.

A faster retrieve can be used to "bulge" the bait, create a surface wake (i.e., "waking a spinnerbait"), or "buzz" the spinnerbait in which the blades chop the surface, creating more noise and leaving a bubbly trail.

==== Blade options ====
At the tip of the wire frame's overhead arm, a spinner blade is attached by a swivel or other means to an enclosed wire loop. Another blade may be attached "in-line" on the overhead arm by means of a clevis to create a "tandem" blade spinnerbait. The characteristics of blades that are stated above for in-line spinners also apply to safety-pin style spinnerbaits. There are no hard-and-fast rules for when to use a particular design, color or size blade or blade combination. Generally, the rounder Colorado blade is used for slow, steady, colder-water retrieves, dropping the bait in a free fall during retrieve pauses, or slow rolling the bait along the bottom. Narrow willowleaf blades are used for fast retrieves and through vegetation. For more on blade hydrodynamics, see below.

==== Skirt options ====
Like in-line spinners, skirt material options are many and depend on the body/target/action profile desired. Skirts are either tied on or attached by a latex or silicone collar to the lead body molded on the hook. For bass, silicone skirts have recently dominated the field over hair or "living" rubber skirts because of all the available molded-in patterns, metal flakes, and incandescent colors. The skirt's pulsating, fluttering motion caused by blade spin is the same as for in-line spinners, but the body target is rounder and has more action with the similar retrieve or a pause in retrieve. The skirt also adds resistance, which can enable the user to retrieve the bait slower depending on how many strands are used; but again, minimum or maximum speed capability depends on blade size and shape. The length of the skirt is typically 1/4-inch past the curve of the hook, but some anglers prefer longer or shorter skirts in order to produce different profiles and action.

Spinnerbait with oversized, swivel-mounted blades or that are retrieved too fast have a tendency to roll over due to torque created by the spinning blade. This decreases the odds of getting a solid hook-up. Ideally, the bait should run true, meaning the overhead arm and the hook are vertical during the horizontal retrieve. Spinnerbaits with spinner blades attached on separate in-line frames are relatively free from torque-induced roll-over and, consequently, achieve higher hook-up ratios.

==== Trailer considerations ====
Spinnerbait dressings or trailers are even more varied than for in-line spinners, and personal preference dominates choice. Shaped pork rind and soft plastic trailers are the norm, with soft plastic being the most prevalent trailer material. They come in many colors. As with in-line spinners, the trailer affects lure profile, action and lift depending on shape and size. For example, a straight, split-tail eel design has the least lift or drag and is more of a skirt-like extension; whereas a large curly-tail grub produces the most rear action, more lift, and the largest profile within the pulsating skirt. Pork or soft plastic chunk baits contribute the most lift to the bait on the horizontal retrieve.

Another advantage of some soft molded trailers—particularly split eel trailers—is that when a fish sucks the lure into its mouth, the trailer tails can catch on the gill rakes. This prolongs the time it takes the fish to spit out the lure and gives the angler another second to react and set the hook.

==== Wire arm length consideration ====
Generally, safety-pin spinnerbaits fall into two groups: short-arm and long-arm. Short-arm spinnerbaits are preferred for more vertical presentations, such as flipping bridge pilings or docks, and working down steep structure like bluffs. They excel for "yo-yo" retrieves. This type of spinnerbait falls better (doesn't nose-dive), presents the spinner blades closer to the skirted body and hook, and is more effective than long-arm models when the bait is dragged across the bottom like a jig or slow-rolled. Typically a Colorado blade is used to slow the fall and create the maximum fluttering flash as the lure descends. Disadvantages: the short arm guards the hook point less effectively and, therefore, makes the lure more prone to snag vegetation and brush than long-arm frames. When dragged over a tree limb, the angler must give a quick tug on the line to skip the lure over the branch before the blade clears and its weight rolls the lure upside down, burying the hook point in wood.

Long-arm spinnerbaits are used when a bait has multiple blades or when more weed resistance is needed during a horizontal retrieve. Single, large blades produce more fish-attracting vibration, increase skirt and trailer pulsation, and provide added lift to the bait on the slowest retrieves. Long-arm baits are typically preferred for "waking a spinnerbait." Disadvantages: the long arm sometimes actually blocks the hook point, especially when larger fish crush the entire lure in their mouth, thus reducing the lure's hook-up efficiency. Because of the position of the blade relative to the lure's body, long-arm spinnerbaits tend to nose-dive when the retrieve is stopped, which means the hook no longer points toward the angler, reducing the hook-up effectiveness of the lure.

==== Stinger (trailer) hooks ====
Adding a trailer hook or "stinger" hook (either a single or treble hook) behind the main spinnerbait hook is also a personal preference and may ensure a better hookup as well preventing fish that jump from throwing the bait. Some anglers prefer the single hook to be rigged so that the point is down, especially in open-water situations. Others prefer it rigged point-up. In either case the hook must be prevented from coming off the main hook or grabbing weeds. One way to accomplish this is to use rubber or silicone tubing cut to 1/8", inserting the eye of the trailer hook and forcing the main hook through the tube-covered eye. The trailer hook is now fixed stationary behind the main hook. Another way allows the hook more side to side motion and consists of stops above and below the eye placed on the main hook. These stops can be 1/8-inch cut silicone tubing or disks hole-punched from the plastic lid of a coffee can or wide rubber bands and placed above and below the trailer hook eye encircling the main hook.

The overhead arm spinnerbait is used for fewer species, but is a great tool for larger sportfish that dominate the food chain. For smaller species, an In-line Spinner or Beetle Spin type design is preferred.

=== Beetle spin ===
Chuck Wood invented the Beetle Spin in 1963–1964. Virgil Ward saw it at the Fishing Shack in Olathe Kansas and his Bass Buster company produced it, then the Johnson Tackle Company bought out Bass Buster. Typically used for panfish, other sport species also attack the bait. A small blade is attached by a swivel (the as for overhead arm spinnerbaits), but the wire frame is formed into a spring clip that opens to allow a jighead to be attached by sliding the jig eye into position such that the jig hook runs in the same direction as the overhead blade.

Jighead dressings are on the short, more compact side and variable in material and design. The curl tail grub is popular, along with straight tail plastics and hair. The original jig dressing was called the cricket, a straight, double-tailed soft plastic creature that had little action except that it wagged up and down and side-to-side behind the spinning blade or with variations in retrieve speed. As the Beetle Spin became more popular, more designs were introduced and softer plastic was used for better action. Many species of fish will hit a Beetle Spin combo.

=== Tailspinner ===
A tailspinner is a type of spinnerbait that consists of a lead body with the line tie point on top, a single treble hook on the bottom, and a single small blade mounted on the tail, hence the name. Mann's Bait Company's "Little George" tailspinner—introduced in the 1960s—is the most well-known lure in this class. When fished vertically for schooling fish in deep water, the bait is ripped upward and then allowed to flutter back down on a semi-taut line. Anglers use it for horizontal presentations as well; it casts like a bullet, so it works well on windy days; however, it sinks like a bullet, too, so one has to reel it quickly in shallow water to keep it from snagging on the bottom.

== See also ==
- Swimbait
- Spoon lure
