= Predatory fish =

Hypercarnivorous fish that sometimes actively prey upon other fish

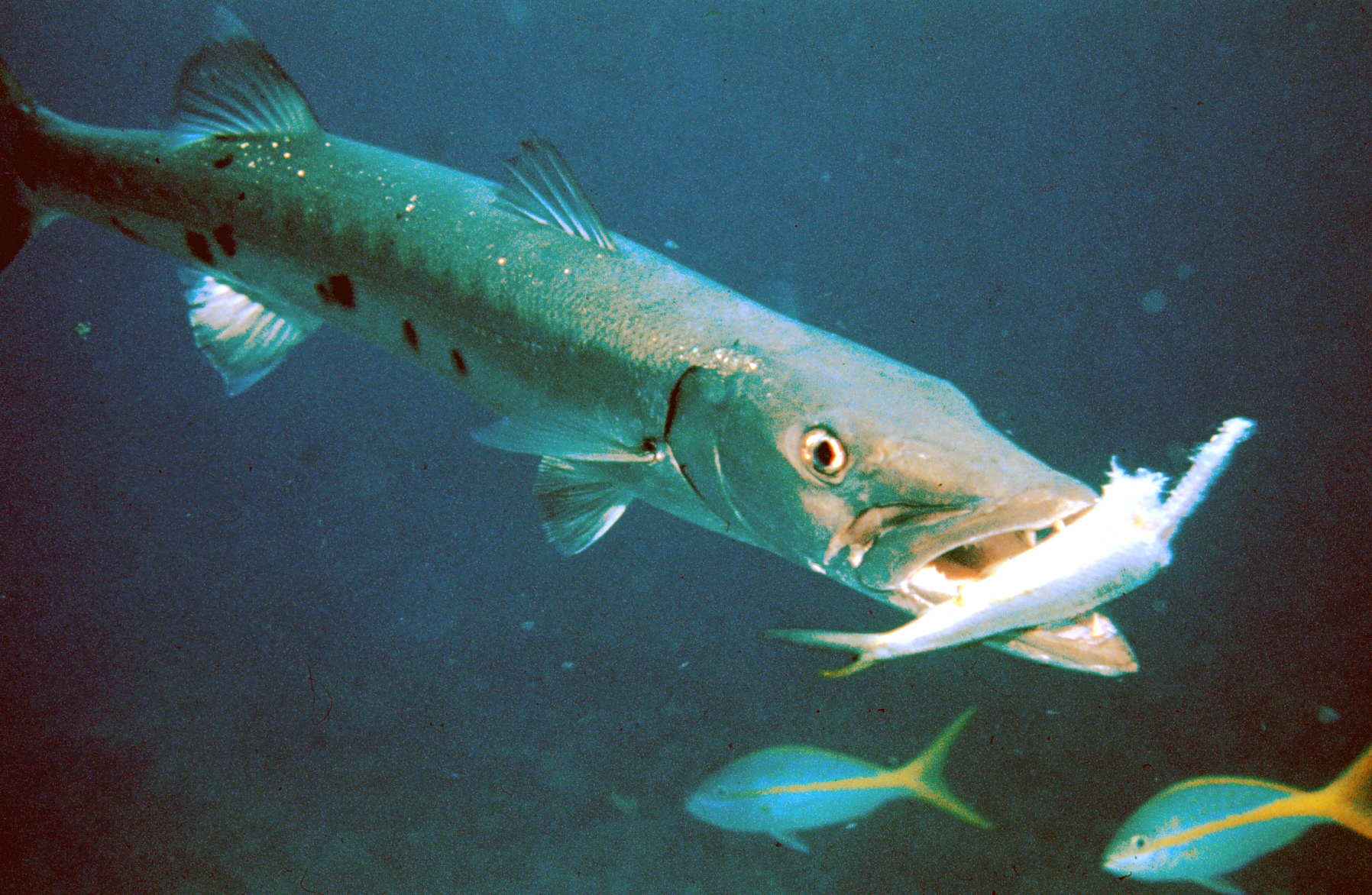
A barracuda preying on a smaller fish

Predatory fish are hypercarnivorous fish that actively prey upon other fish or aquatic animals, with examples including shark, billfish, barracuda, alligator gar, tuna, dolphinfish, walleye, perch and salmon. Some omnivorous fish, such as the red-bellied piranha, can occasionally also be predatory, although they are not strictly regarded as obligately predatory fish.

Populations of large predatory fish in the global oceans were estimated to be about 10% of their pre-industrial levels by 2003, and they are most at risk of extinction; there was a disproportionate level of large predatory fish extinctions during the Cretaceous–Paleogene extinction event 66 million years ago. Creation of marine reserves has been found to restore populations of large predatory fish such as the Serranidae — groupers and sea bass.

Predatory fish switch between types of prey in response to variations in their abundance. Such changes in preference are disproportionate and are selected for as evolutionarily efficient. Predatory fish may become a pest if they are introduced into an ecosystem in which they become a new top predator. An example, which has caused much trouble in Maryland and Florida, is the snakehead fish.

Predatory fish such as sharks, billfish, alligator gar and tuna form a part of the human diet and are targeted by fisheries, but they tend to concentrate significant quantities of mercury in their bodies because they are high in the food chain, especially as apex predators, due to biomagnification.

Predators are an important factor to consider in managing fisheries, and methods for doing so are available and used in some places.

Additionally, the existence of these predators also allows its prey to evolve countermeasures through natural selection. Consequently, the predators and prey will be locked in an evolutionary arms race, each looking to gain the upper hand on the other. The presence of fish predators play a large role in the size, shape and swimming performance of the Lithobates clamitans tadpoles. The presence of these predators in their habitat causes the tadpoles to develop small bodies and large tail muscles in order to escape from their predators quicker and more efficiently.

Some predatory fish, such as lamnid sharks, billfishes, tuna, opah and butterfly kingfish, have the ability for cranial endothermy, i.e., the ability to elevate eye and brain temperatures, which helps with vision and neural function during ambient temperature changes.

== See also ==
- Feeding frenzy
- Scale eating
- Shark attack
- Shark feeding
