= Glossary of survivalist terminology =

Survivalists maintain their movement identity and subculture by using specialized terminology and slang not generally understood outside their circles. Many survivalist terms are derived from military terminology, military slang, government and military acronyms, CB radio terminology, and American gun culture, though the subculture has also developed its own terminology.

== List of terminology ==
7 S's
"Shape, Skyline, Silhouette, Speed, Shine, Sound, Shade". Attributes that aid in maintaining a low profile in a dangerous area.
Alpha strategy
The practice of storing extra consumable items. Coined by John Pugsley.
BOB
Bug-out bag. A pack containing everything needed to leave home and get to a safe location until able to return safely.
BOL
Bug-out location. Essentially a term for a safe location to reach when "bugging-out". Synonymous with retreat.
BOV
Bug-out vehicle. A designated and sufficiently capable vehicle used to bug out, and for transport in that scenario.
Doomer
Someone who believes in a Malthusian-scale societal collapse, especially the belief that such a collapse is imminent and will happen in the near or immediate future.
Code name/handle
For CB radio and walkie talkie usage. Used with ACP 131, brevity codes, and simplex communications.
Dead drop
A method of espionage tradecraft used to pass items or information between two individuals using a secret location. By avoiding direct meetings, individuals can maintain operational security. This method stands in contrast to the live drop, so-called because two persons meet to exchange items or information.
SERE
A British and American military training concept designed to teach survival skills, evading enemies, and resisting or escaping capture; or, the practice and use of these concepts.
EDC
Everyday carry. The weaponry one carries at all times in case disaster strikes, usually in reference to a handgun. Also refers to the normal carrying of such a weapon for self-defense, or (as a noun) the weapon that is carried.
EOTW
"End Of The World".
EROL
"Excessive Rule Of Law". Describes a situation where a government becomes oppressive and uses its powers and laws to control citizens. Sometimes used interchangeably with martial law.
Fieldcraft
The techniques and practices of living in the field and evading monitoring by hostile opposition.
FSNAP
"Fitness, Skills, Networking, Actions on, Personal skills".
Ganbaru
A Japanese word for continuing on tenaciously through serious difficulties.
Goblin
A criminal miscreant, coined in the survivalist context by Jeff Cooper.
GOOD
"Get Out Of Dodge". The strategy of fleeing urban areas in the event of a disaster to avoid the chaos unfolding there. Originally coined based on historical criminal violence in Dodge City, Kansas; its survivalist use originated from James Wesley Rawles.
GOOD kit
See above; synonymous with bug-out bag. Sometimes also referred to as "go bag", with the intent for helping facilitate an escape at short notice.
Grey man/woman/person
A person who blends in with a wider crowd or surroundings, to avoid drawing attention to themselves.
Hidesite
A hidden shelter with high concealment, used for matters such as surveillance.
INCH pack
"I'm Never Coming Home" pack. A subtype of bug-out bag that contains everything needed to leave society for the wilderness and never return, hence the name. Generally consists of man-portable equipment to accomplish most wilderness survival tasks and sustain oneself for the foreseeable future without external aid, such as fishing tackle, tool and clothing repair kits, a bow and arrow, blades such as axes, and primitive tools or items to create or maintain tools such as knapping stones, whetstones, and novaculite. As the items in an INCH pack are numerous and heavy, emphasis is placed on efficiency—for instance, packing seeds to grow crops instead of food items.
Lootbox
A derogatory term for a prepper who is perceived as ill-prepared and/or overconfident enough that they are expected to die shortly into a real survival scenario or one where conflict may occur, leaving their amassed kit and belongings as "loot" free for others to take.
MYOG
"Make Your Own Gear". Improvising clothing, tools, equipment, or weapons from scratch or by modifying existing examples. MYOG kit differs from improvising from surrounding leftovers found on the spot during a survival operation.
Operator
An individual tasked with a survival mission.
Outpost
A shelter, often used as an observation post/checkpoint on behalf of a larger area used as a substitute in a sparse outback area.
PAW
"Post-Apocalyptic World".
Pollyanna/Polly
Someone who is in denial about the disruption that might be caused by the advent of a large-scale disaster, or the idea that one may be imminent and that preparations are necessary.
Prepper
Refers to someone who is prepared or making preparations, such as by stockpiling food and ammunition, especially for a disaster they perceive as coming. Can be contrasted slightly with "survivalist", which emphasizes outdoor survival skills and self-sufficiency, but sometimes used synonymously. Originated in the 1990s and early 2000s.
Practical prepper
A prepper who is only prepared for and expecting a short-term disaster, such as a flood, tornado, or long-term power outage, where external aid and rescue is available and normal life can reasonably be expected to resume afterward (i.e. not a societal collapse or EOTW).
RISTA
"Reconnaissance, Intelligence, Surveillance and Target Acquisition". Also alternatively referred to as ISTAR.
Retreat
A shelter or place of refuge used by survivalists to live and hold out in during a survival scenario.
RISTA/ISTAR kit
Equipment such as telescopes, night vision devices, range finders, and other relevant items, used for observation.
RV point
A rendezvous/meet-up point.
Situation room
A designated room containing CB radios, maps, charts, supplies, and other items and resources for survival planning.
Sheep
A person who trusts the government, institutions, or popular culture blindly. Similar to Pollyanna.
Shiznit/Shiz
A high-end or highly sought after object or idea that ultimately outs other solutions.
SHTF
"Shit Hits/Hitting The Fan". A catastrophic or apocalyptic situation that results in severe chaos, unrest, and a major breakdown of society or even civilization, often framed as a given.
Staging area
An area or room used for rigging up equipment for a survival operation.
Strategic reserve
A reserve of supplies, items, goods, or other resources that is held back from normal use to pursue a particular strategy or cope with unexpected events.
Tradecraft
The techniques, methods, and technologies used in modern espionage and generally as part of the activity of intelligence assessment.
TEOTWAWKI
"The End Of The World As We Know It". The end of recognizable organized society, either permanently or in the process of replacement by a different form. Has been used since at least the early 1960s, though alternative origins suggest the 1984 television film Threads, R.E.M.'s 1987 song "It's the End of the World as We Know It (And I Feel Fine)", or the Usenet newsgroup "misc.survivalism" in 1996.
Uncivilization
A generic term for a great catastrophe.
WROL
"Without Rule Of Law". Describes a potential lawless state of society.
YOYO
"You're On Your Own". Coined in the survivalist context by David Weed.
Zombie
Unprepared, incidental survivors of a prepped-for disaster, "who feed on the preparations of others".
Zombie apocalypse
Used by some survivalists as a tongue-in-cheek metaphor for any natural or man-made disaster and "a clever way of drawing people's attention to disaster preparedness". The premise is that "if you are prepared for a scenario where the walking corpses of your family and neighbors are trying to eat you alive, you will be prepared for almost anything", though "there are some... who are seriously preparing for a zombie attack".
