= The Gray Man =

Grey man, The Gray Man or The Grey Man may refer to:

== People ==
- The primary nickname of American serial killer Albert Fish
- A nickname of British Prime Minister John Major, known as the "grey man" of British politics
- "Grey man/woman", a term in survivalist terminology

== Legendary or alleged people or entities ==
- The Gray Man (ghost), a historical ghost of Pawleys Island
- The Grey Man of Scottish folklore, also named Fear liath
- Grey alien, an alleged race of extraterrestrials

== Fictional characters ==
- The Gray Man (The Hardy Boys), a character from the book series
- Gray Man (The Wheel of Time), a creature in the Wheel of Time novels

== Film, television, and literature ==
- D.Gray-man, a 2004 manga and anime series
- The Gray Man, a series of spy novels by Mark Greaney
  - The Gray Man (novel), a 2009 novel by Mark Greaney, first in the series of novels
  - The Gray Man (2022 film), an American film based on the 2009 Mark Greaney novel
- The Gray Man (2002 film), an action film co-starring Angelo Fierro
- The Gray Man (2007 film), a biographical thriller starring Patrick Bauchau
- "The Grey Man", a season 6 episode of NCIS: Los Angeles
- A passage from a serial version of H. G. Wells' The Time Machine which was deleted from the book version, which was later published under the title "The Grey Man"
