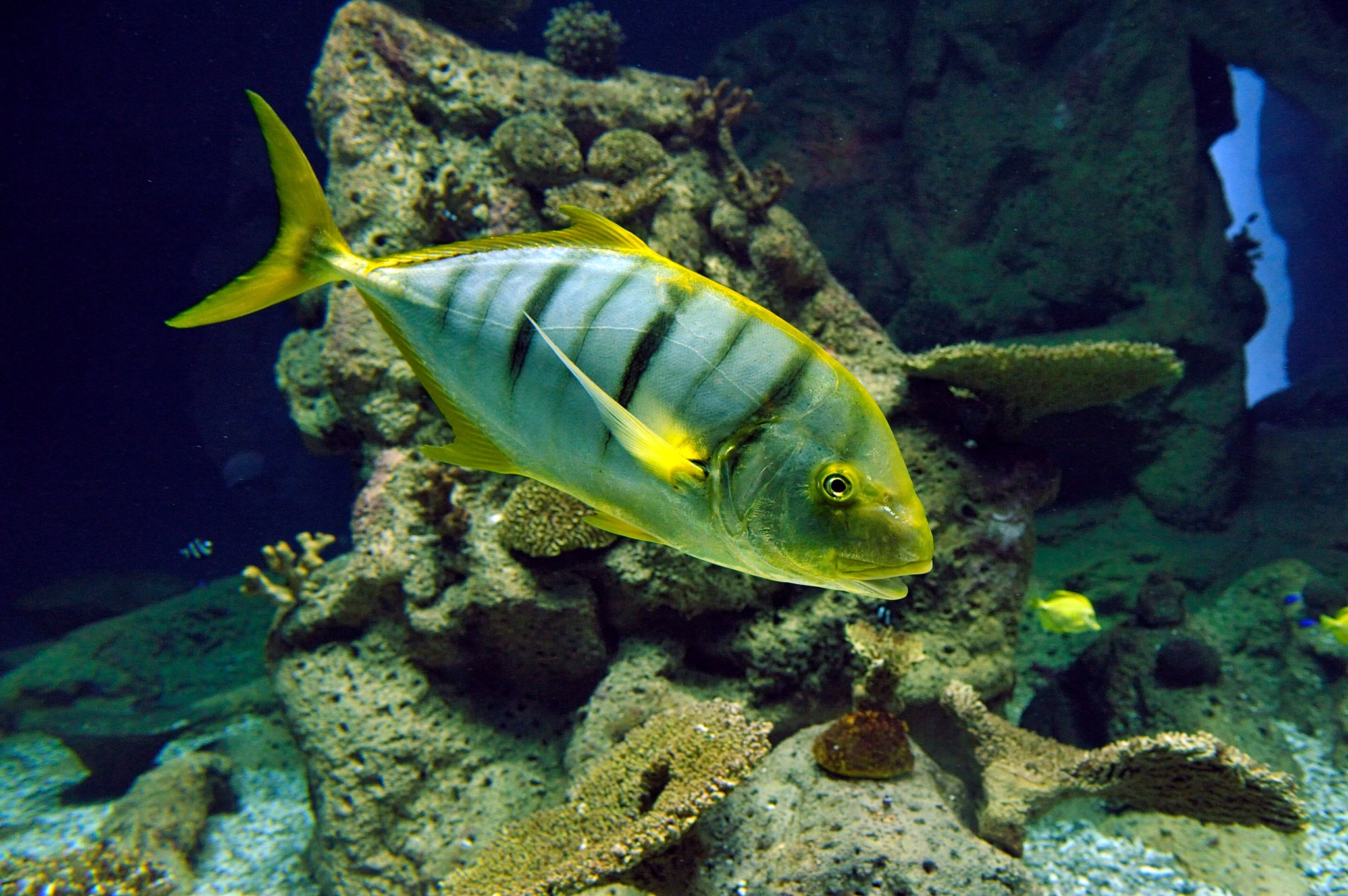

Conservation status
- Least Concern (IUCN 3.1)

Scientific classification
- Kingdom: Animalia
- Phylum: Chordata
- Class: Actinopterygii
- Division: Teleostei
- Order: Carangiformes
- Suborder: Carangoidei
- Family: Carangidae
- Subfamily: Caranginae
- Genus: Gnathanodon; Bleeker, 1851
- Species: G. speciosus

Binomial name
- Gnathanodon speciosus (Forsskål, 1775)
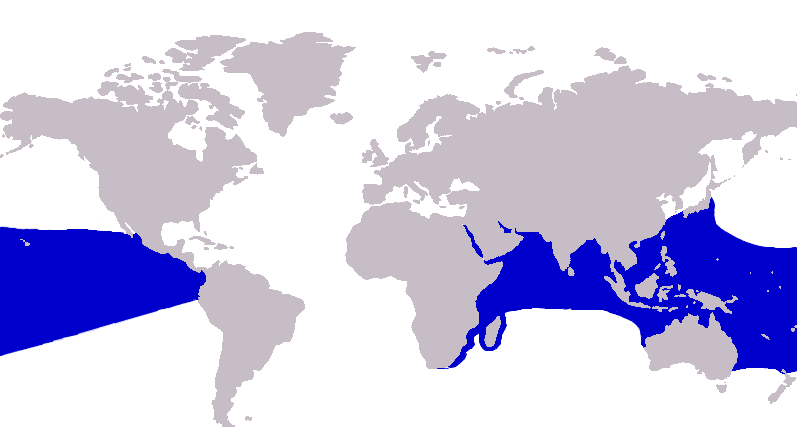
- Approximate range of the golden trevally

Synonyms
- List: Scomber speciosus Forsskål, 1775; Caranx speciosus (Forsskål, 1775); Caranx panamensis Gill, 1863; Caranx edentulus Alleyne & Macleay, 1877; Caranx cives De Vis, 1884; Caranx obtusiceps Macleay, 1882; Caranx petaurista Geoffroy St. Hilaire, 1817; Caranx poloosoo Richardson, 1848; Caranx rueppellii Günther (ex Rüppell), 1860

= Golden trevally =

Species of fish

The golden trevally (Gnathanodon speciosus), also known as the golden kingfish, banded trevally or king trevally, is a species of large marine fish classified in the jack and horse mackerel family Carangidae, and the only member of the monospecific genus Gnathanodon. The golden trevally is widely distributed throughout the tropical and subtropical waters of the Indian and Pacific Oceans, ranging from South Africa in the west to Central America in the east, extending to Japan in the north and Australia in the south. The species predominantly occupies inshore waters where it inhabits both reef and sandy substrates.

The golden trevally is easily distinguished from its relatives by its fleshy, rubbery lips and unique colouration, which ranges from bright yellow with black bars as a juvenile to a golden-silvery colour as an adult. It is known to grow to 120 centimetres (47 in) in length and 15 kilograms (33 lb) in weight. The golden trevally schools as a juvenile, often closely following larger objects including sharks and jellyfish. The species uses its protractile jaws to suck out prey from the sand or reef, and consumes a variety of fish, crustaceans and molluscs. Spawning aggregations gather at night at different times of the year throughout its range. The golden trevally is a considerable constituent of several Middle Eastern fisheries and being of minor importance to many others, with a worldwide annual catch of 1,187 metric tons (1,168 long tons; 1,308 short tons) to 3,475 metric tons (3,420 long tons; 3,831 short tons) recorded between 2000 and 2010. The golden trevally is a popular gamefish, taken by bait, lure, fly and also spear throughout its range. Several Asian countries currently farm the fish in caged aquaculture. Due to their brilliant colouration, juveniles are popular in marine aquaria.

== Taxonomy and phylogeny ==
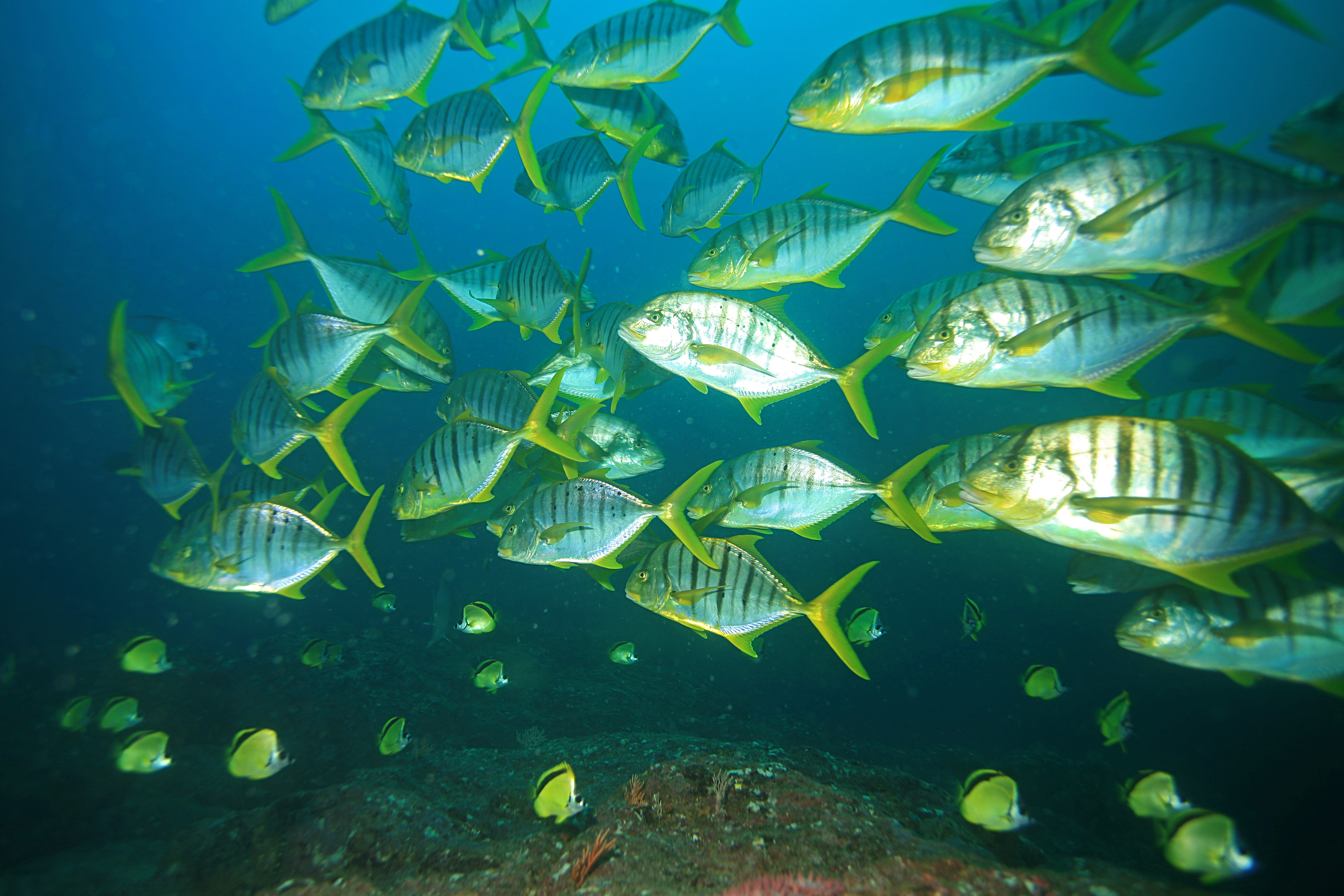
A school of subadult golden trevally in Panama

The golden trevally is the only member of the monotypic genus Gnathanodon, which is one of the thirty genera in the jack and horse mackerel family Carangidae, which in turn is part of the order Carangiformes.

The species was scientifically described for the first time by the Swedish naturalist Peter Forsskål in 1775. Forsskål referred the species to the genus Scomber, where many jacks were placed before the recognition of the family Carangidae. The species is initially referred with two epithets; Scomber rim, speciosus in this publication; however the following page names it as Scomber speciosus with 'rim' given as a transcription of the species' Arabic name. Consequently, authorities regard Scomber rim as a junior synonym. Forsskål's description was based on an individual from the Red Sea off Jeddah, Saudi Arabia. The holotype has since been lost and a neotype was invalidly designated by Ronald Fricke in 1999. The specific epithet speciosus is Latin for beautiful. The species was transferred to Caranx before the Dutch ichthyologist Pieter Bleeker placed it in its own genus Gnathanodon, with this name derived from the Latin for 'toothless jaws'. In addition to Forsskål's naming, seven other later names have been ascribed to the fish, with all of these now recognised as invalid junior synonyms under ICZN rules. The species common names generally refer to its appearance with 'golden trevally' (or kingfish), 'banded trevally' and 'king trevally' used. In Hawaii the species is referred to as 'ulua paʻopaʻo' or 'papio' when small.

A study on the phylogenetic relationships of the Carangidae-based primarily on osteology by Soko Gushiken found that Gnathanodon is closely related to and forms a monophyletic group with Caranx. The species has yet to be included in any molecular phylogeny study of the family.

== Distribution and habitat ==
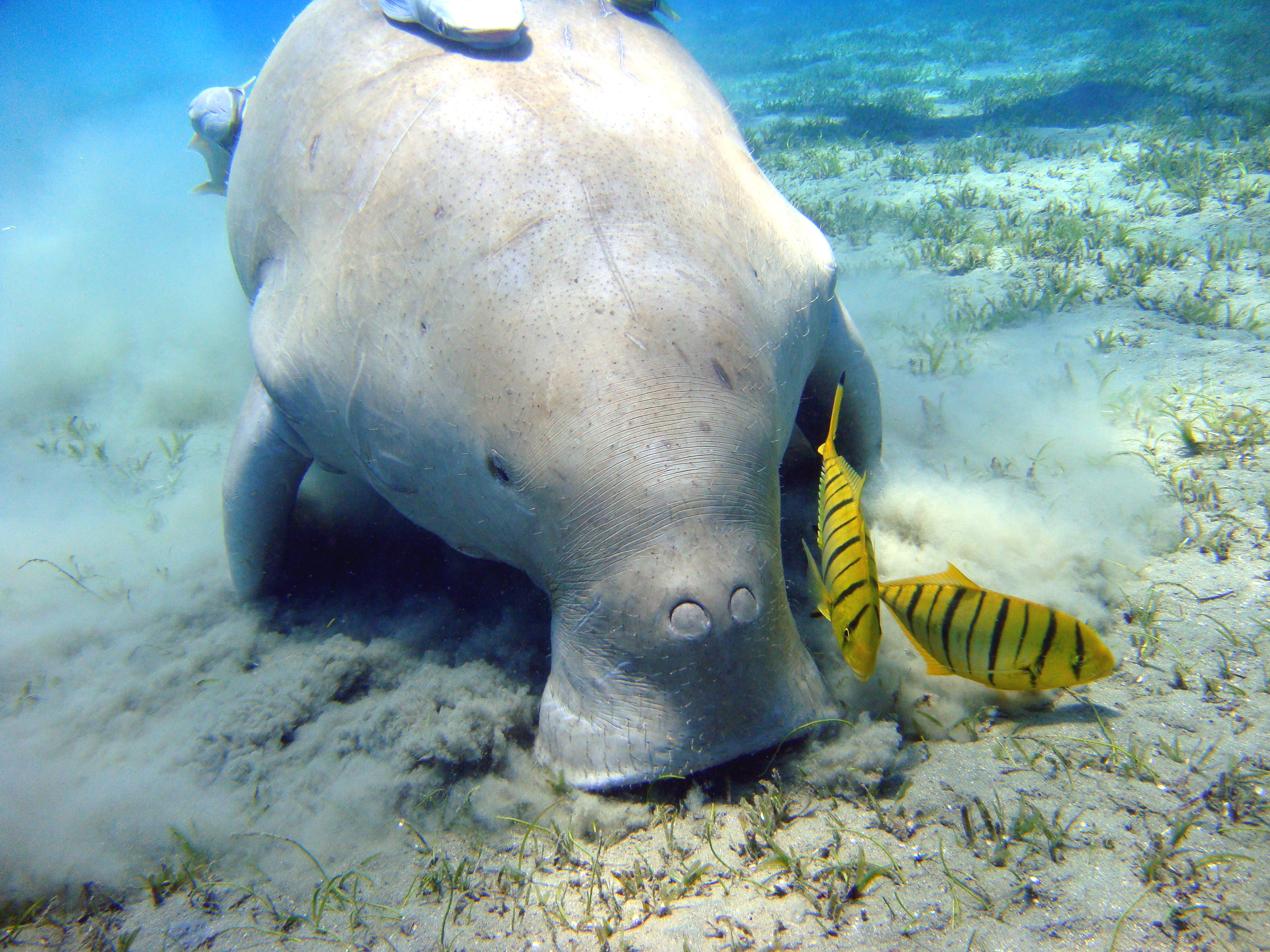
Golden trevally accompanying a foraging dugong, in the Red Sea

The golden trevally is widely distributed throughout the tropical and subtropical waters of the Indian and Pacific Oceans. In the Indian Ocean, the species is distributed from South Africa along the east African coastline, including the Red Sea and Persian Gulf. Its distribution extends east along the Indian and South East Asian coastlines, and south through Indonesia and northern Australia. Golden trevally are recorded from many Indian Ocean islands including Madagascar, Seychelles and The Maldives. In the Pacific, the species is spread throughout the South East Asian and Indonesian archipelago north mainland China and Japan and south to eastern Australia and New Zealand. Golden trevally have been recorded from many central Pacific Islands, including Hawaii, with their distribution extending to Central America. Here its range extends from the Gulf of California in the north to Colombia in the south.

The golden trevally predominantly occupies inshore waters of varying substrate, although is known to occur on deeper continental shelf reefs in Australia. In coastal areas the species inhabits rocky and coral reefs as well as open sand flats where it forages for food. A systematic study in northern Australia indicated it to be one of the only species to be approximately equally distributed in both reef and soft-bottom habitats. Golden trevally appear to prefer clear water to turbid waters, and thus is only encountered rarely in low turbidity estuarine environments. One known exception to this was the capture of several individuals in a shallow mangrove swamp in Baja California which appeared to be foraging for prey.

== Description ==
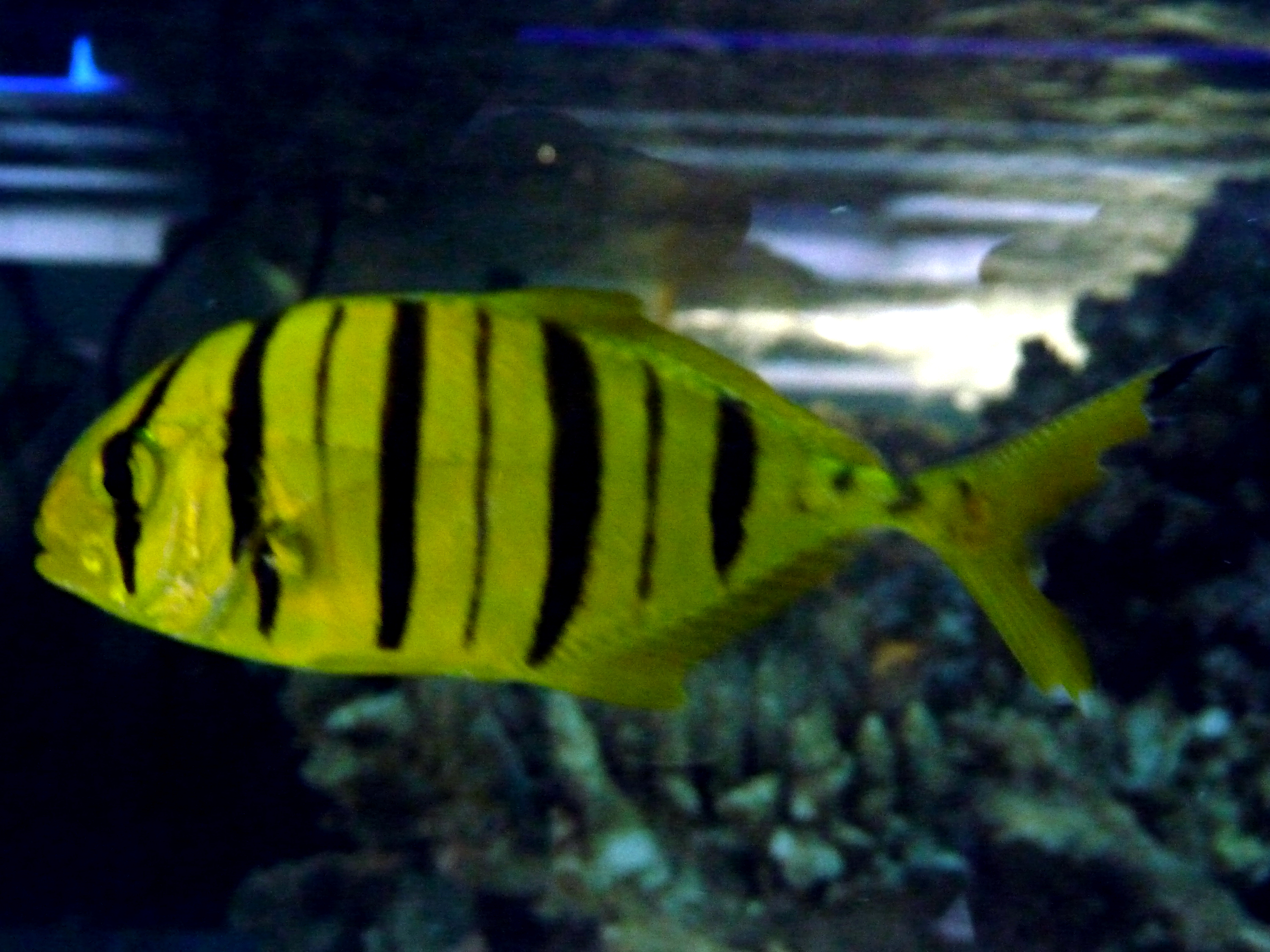
Juvenile

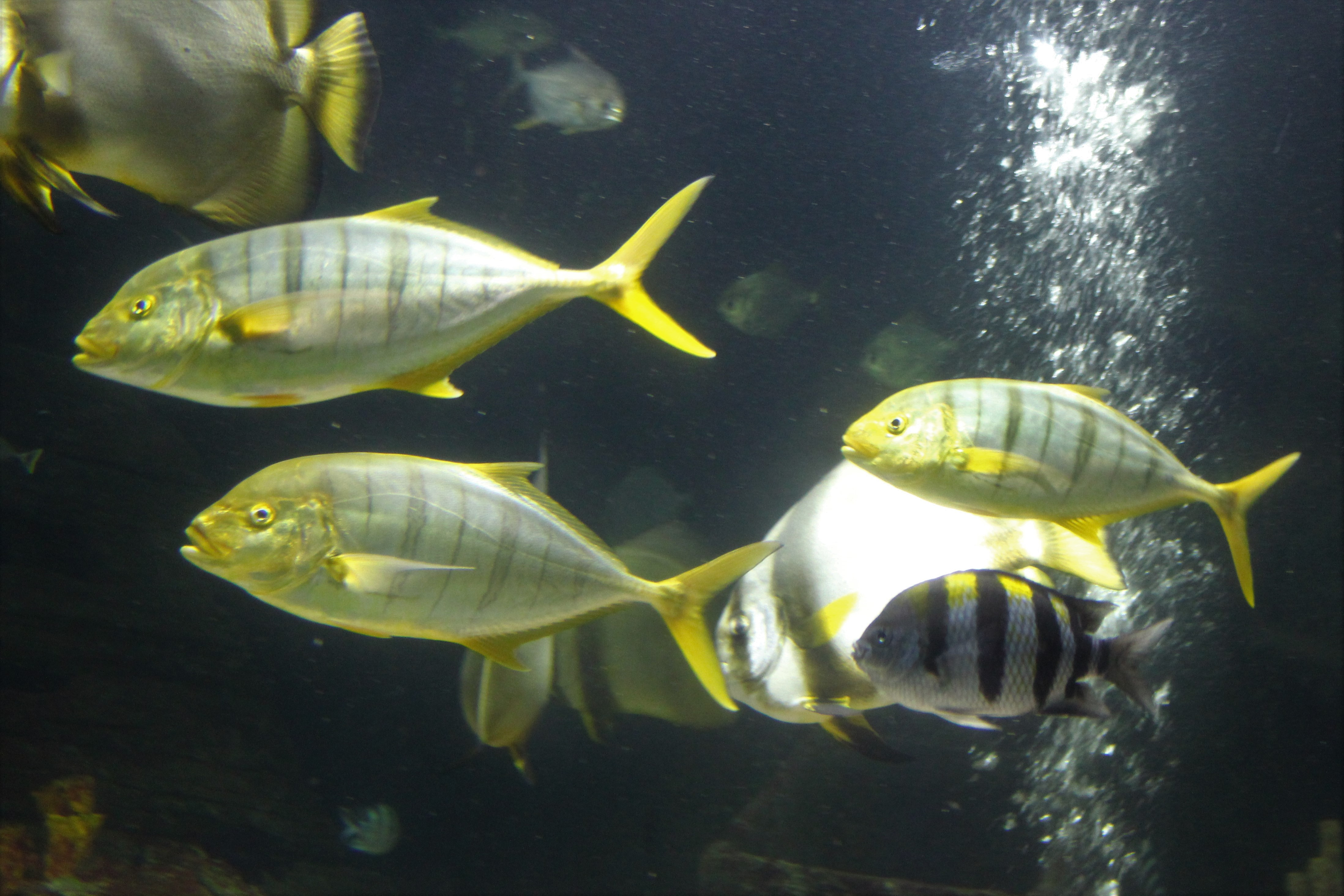
In captivity

The golden trevally is a relatively large fish, growing to a maximum recorded size of 120 cm (47 in) in length and 15.0 kg in weight. It is similar to most other trevallies and jacks in having a compressed, oblong body, with the dorsal profile slightly more convex than the ventral profile, particularly anteriorly. The species' mouth is one of its defining features; the mouth is highly protractile and fleshy, with specimens greater than 90 mm having no teeth on the jaws, vomer or tongue. Smaller individuals have a series of small villiform teeth in both jaws. The dorsal fin is in two parts, the first with 7 spines, the second with 1 spine and 18 to 20 soft rays. The anal fin has 2 detached spines followed by 1 spine and 15 to 17 soft rays, while the pelvic fin consists of 1 spine and 19 to 20 soft rays. The curved part of the lateral line is moderately arched; containing 62 to 73 scales, and approximately equal in length to the straight section containing 15 to 27 scales and 18 to 25 scutes. The breast is completely scaled. There are 27 to 30 gill rakers and 24 vertebrae in total.

The golden trevally's colour is the species most prominent distinguishing feature, and for which it acquired its common names. Juveniles are a bright golden yellow colour over their entire body and all fins, with 7 to 11 black vertical crossbars all over their body. These bars generally alternate between broad and narrow. The caudal fin lobes have dark tips and there is a prominent black edge to the operculum. As the fish grows, the body becomes more silver to silvery golden and the cross bars fade or disappear, often replaced by dark blotches. The fins remain yellow, often with greenish tinges. The dark edge of the operculum also fades with age.

== Biology and ecology ==
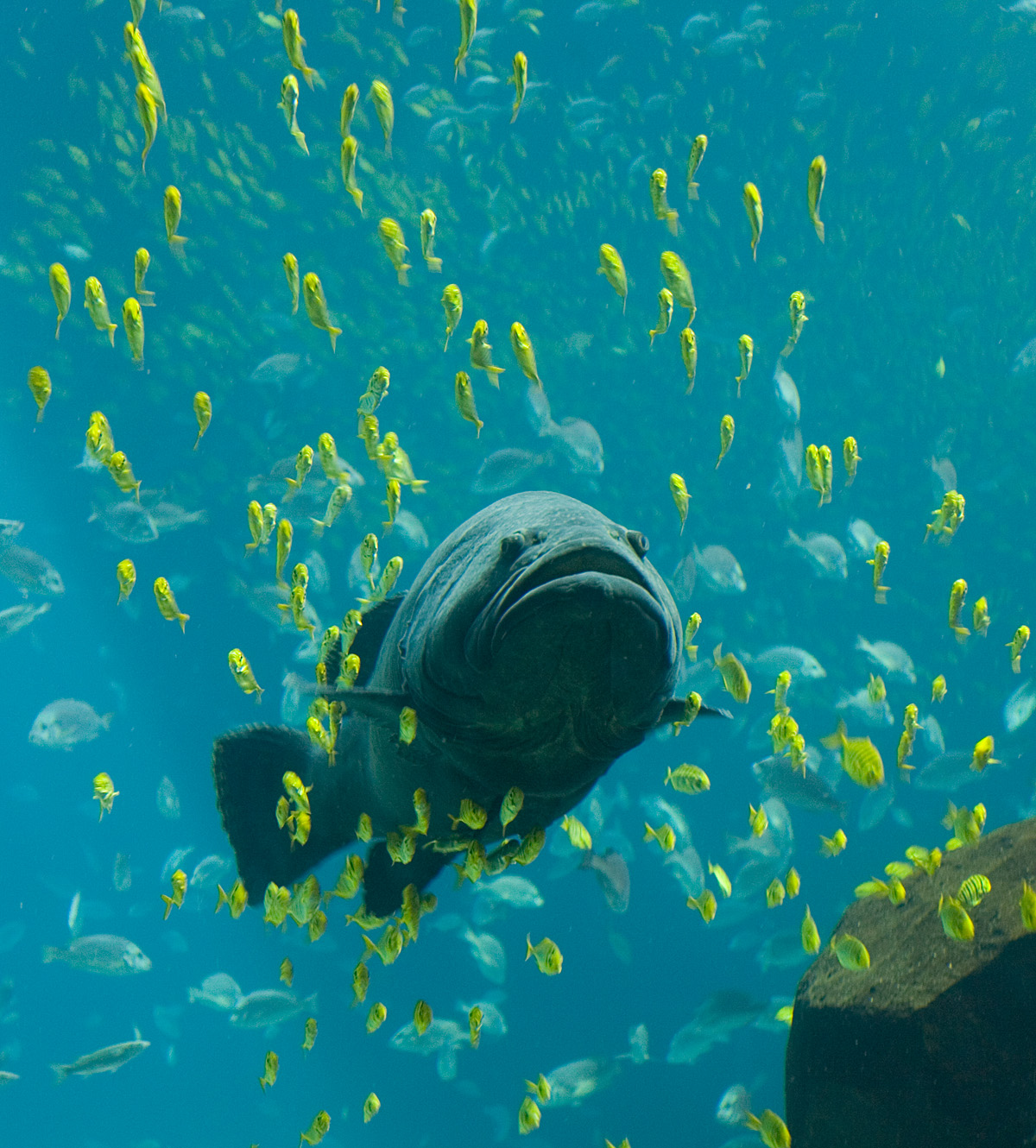
Juveniles following a giant grouper, at the Georgia Aquarium

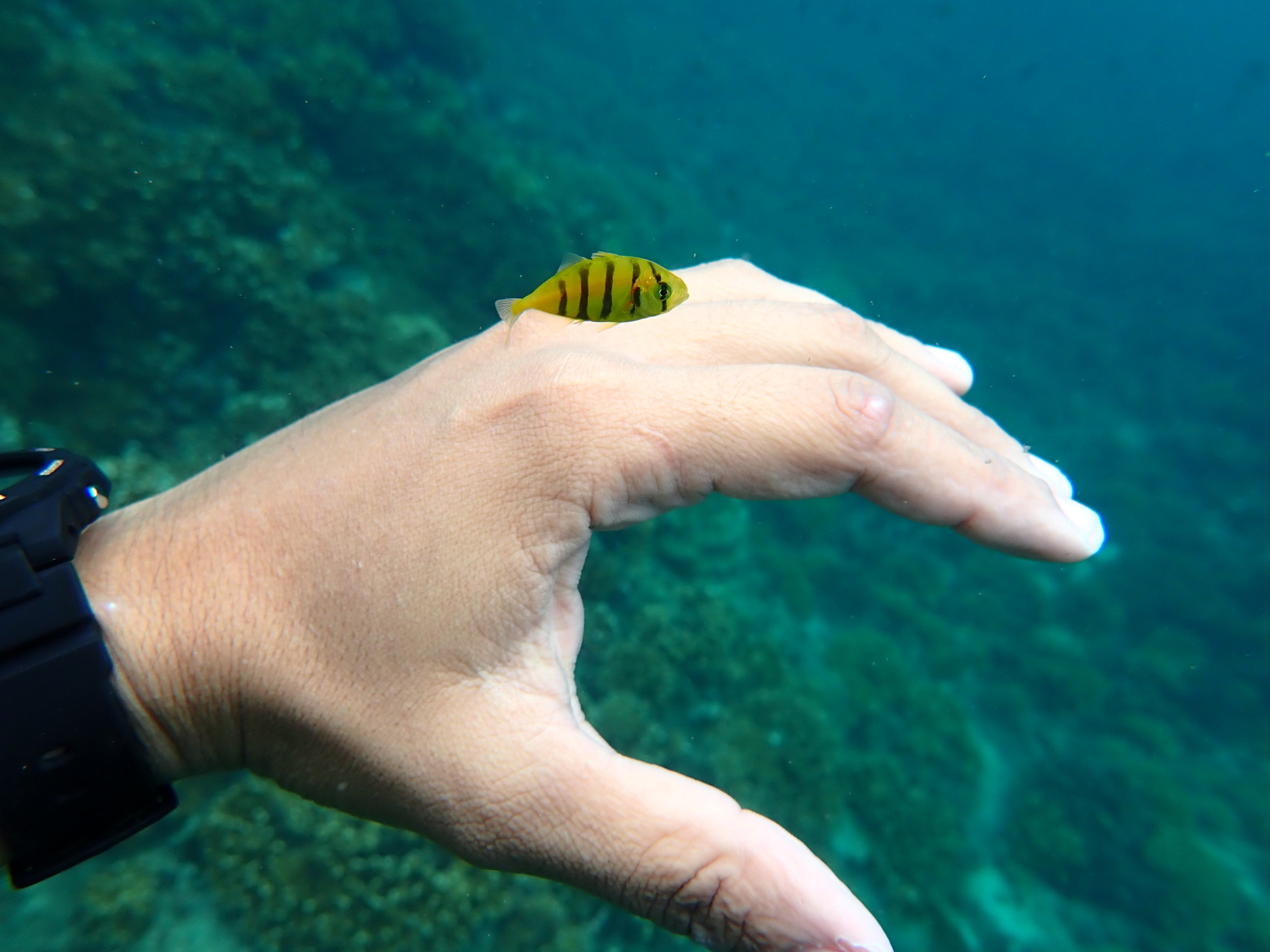
Very young juvenile following a diver's hand

The golden trevally is found either as a solitary individual or in small schools as an adult. Juveniles tend to form larger schools which tend to congregate and follow ( or "pilot") larger fish such as groupers, sharks, and even jellyfish. This behaviour mimics that of the related pilot fish, Naucrates ductor, with their maneuverability protecting them from their hosts, which in turn provides them with protection from predation from other fish. This behaviour extends to scuba divers, with one diver reporting a single young individual obsessively stationing itself in front of his face plate.

=== Diet and feeding ===
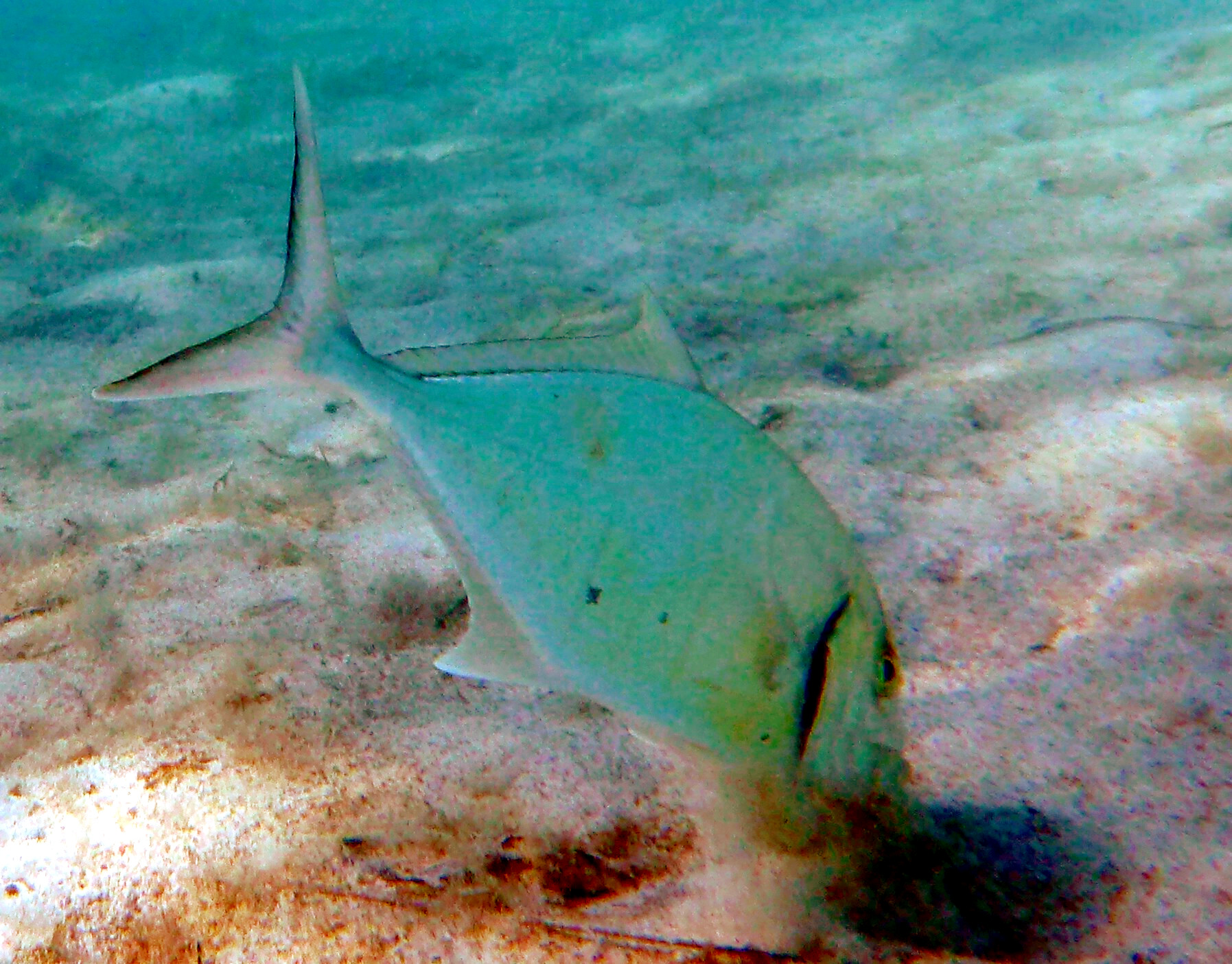
Foraging in the sand

The golden trevally is a diurnal foraging carnivore which, unlike other carangids, does not normally seek out individual prey items. The highly protractile mouth possessed by the species is used to form a tube to suck prey out of both reef- and algae-dominated habitats, as well as filtering organisms out of sandy substrates. In the latter case, both sand and any prey items are taken into the mouth and filtered through the gill rakers; sand is expelled, while small organisms are trapped and swallowed. The species takes a variety of prey including crustaceans such as shrimp, crabs, and amphipods, as well as molluscs, other fossorial invertebrates in the sand, and small fish. Golden trevally found inhabiting a mangrove swamp were found to have fed exclusively on fish (Mugil curema), suggesting the species also actively hunts down fleeing prey. A laboratory study using only four individuals being fed found that one fish will take the 'lead' position in this situation while another will attack the other fish in the school, apparently in competition for food.

=== Reproduction ===
Reproduction in the golden trevally has been studied in both the Indian and Pacific Oceans. In Hawaii, spawning occurred from late February to early October, with a peak from late April to early September. Five distinct peaks during this time were correlated with the first and third quarters of the moon. Spawning occurred from the early evening into the night. In the Indian Ocean, in the southern Persian Gulf, spawning occurred in April and May, with defined peaks in recruitment of juveniles into the local fishery during September and October. The male:female sex ratio in this population was 1:1.01, close to parity. Growth rates were also studied using otoliths in this population, with an increase in growth rate during the winter (November to April). Von Bertalanffy growth curves were also calculated for the species.

=== Parasites ===
A variety of parasites have been recorded from the species, including copepods, flatworms, and a nematode which inhabits the fish's swimbladder.

== Relationship to humans ==
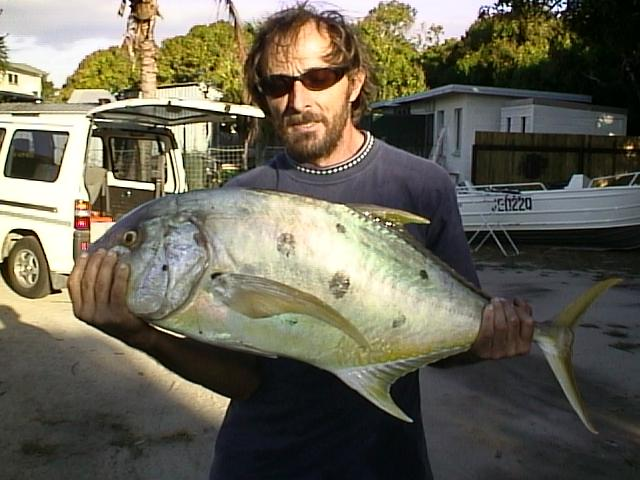
A fisherman's catch of golden trevally

The golden trevally has long been used as a food fish by humans, with archeological sites in the United Arab Emirates yielding the remains of this species dating back to prehistory. The species is still fished for using many traditional methods in the Pacific Islands, where it is netted and speared when it moves to shallower waters. Golden trevally are considered one of the best members of the trevally family for eating, with bleeding being recommended. The fish has slightly translucent, dark-pink flesh while fresh, becoming white and juicy during cooking, although has a tendency to become dry, flaky, and fibrous. A rich, tangy fish flavour is noted.

=== Commercial fisheries ===
On a larger commercial scale, the species is often caught using gill nets and other artisanal fish-trapping methods. The FAO catch records for golden trevally indicate it forms a regular part of the fisheries of the UAE, Qatar, and Bahrain and to a much lesser extent in Australia and Singapore. Records in Western Australia indicate commercial fisheries took 3.3 t of golden trevally in 2010, while the catch in Queensland has fluctuated between 0.6 and 5.9 t from 1988-2005. Between 2000 and 2010 the worldwide catch recorded by the FAO varied from 1187 t to 3475 t.

The golden trevally is also farmed in cage aquaculture by Singapore, Taiwan, Malaysia, and Indonesia, with spawning demonstrated in captivity in Japan.

=== Recreational fishing ===
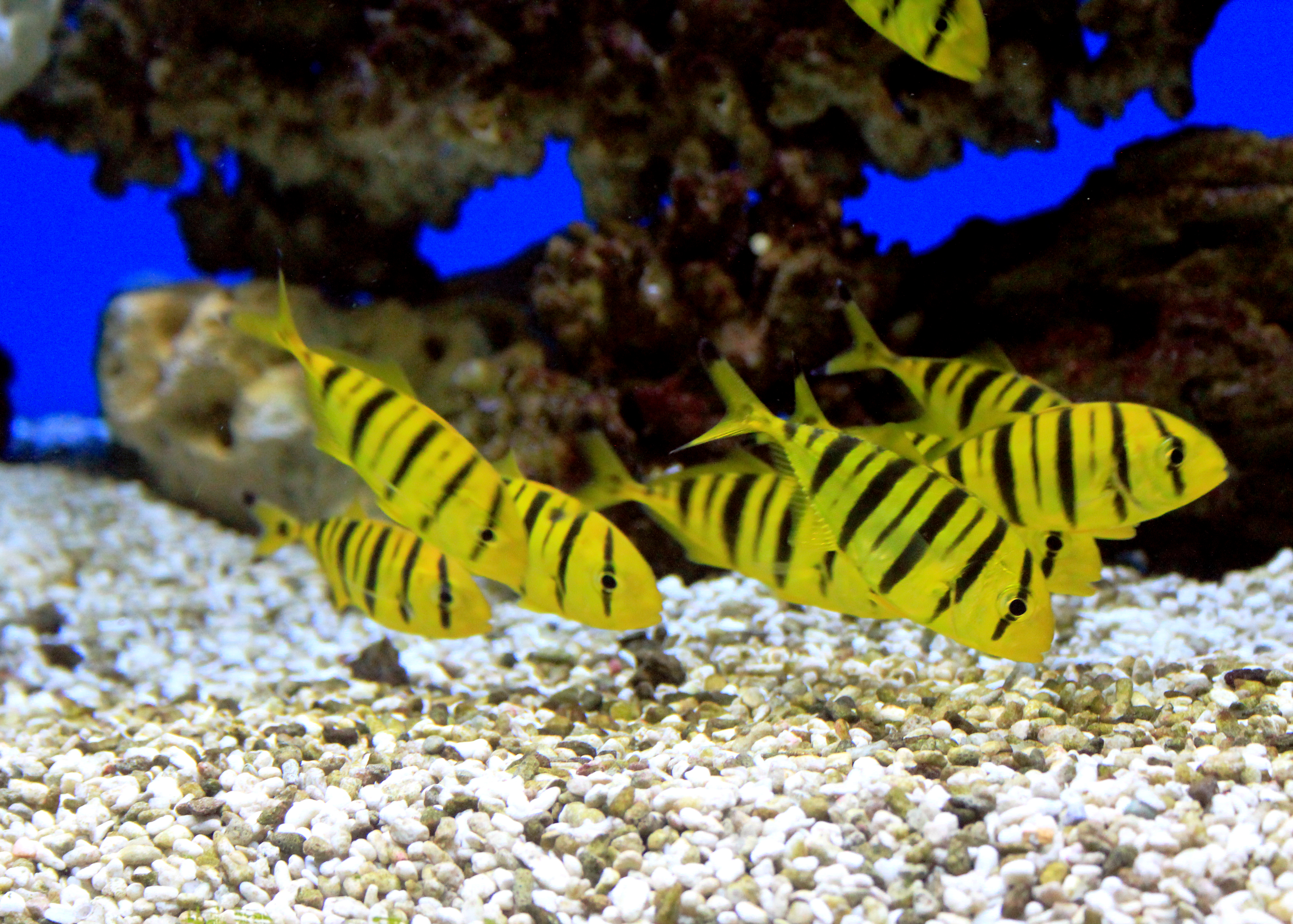
Juveniles, at Prague Sea Aquarium

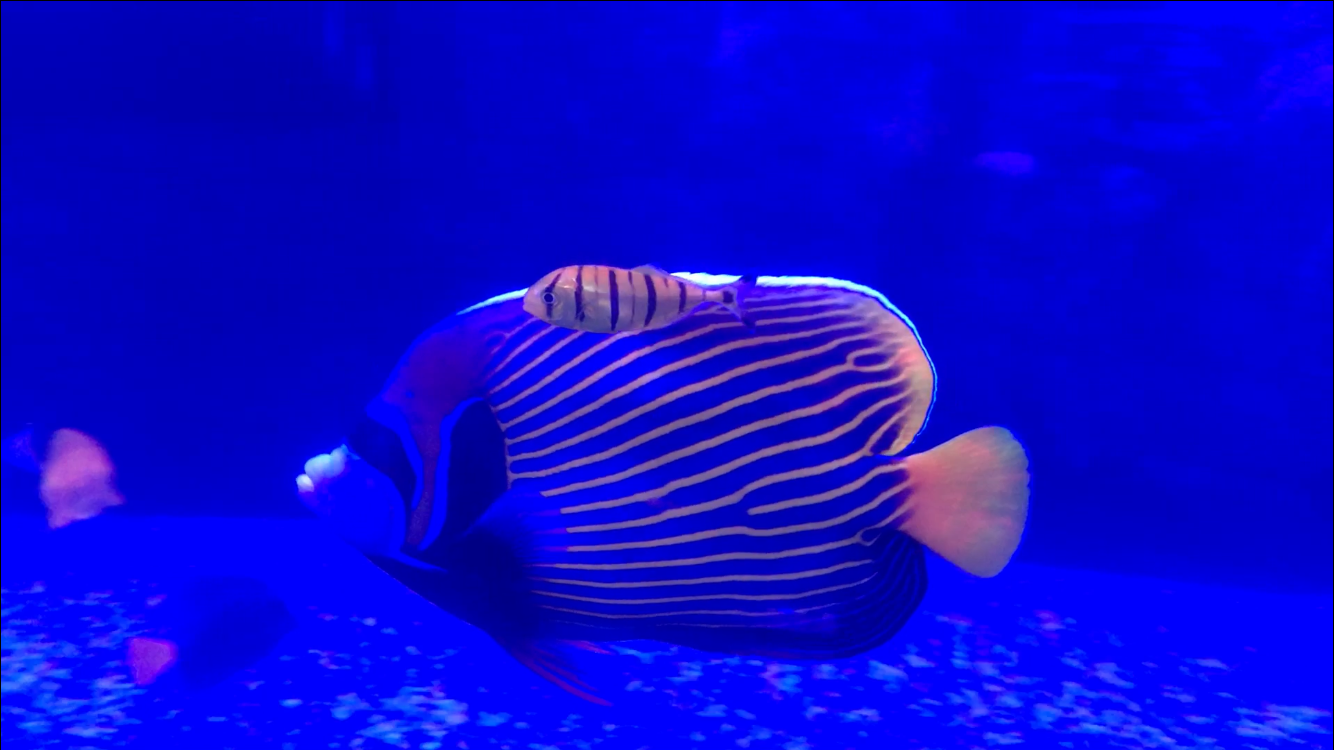
Juveniles hosting an emperor angelfish in an aquarium store

The golden trevally is commonly targeted by both anglers and spearfishermen, and is considered to be a gamefish. Once hooked, golden trevally are known for fast runs and hard fights, especially when reef or other structures are present.

Golden trevally will take a variety of baits and lures and may be caught from both the shore and boats, making it a highly accessible species. Baits commonly employed for golden trevally include prawns and a variety of small fish or cut baits. The fish are known to follow a burley stream right up to the back of a boat, allowing for easy capture on unweighted baits. A variety of lures may be employed when targeting the species, including jigs, poppers, spoons, slices, and minnows, with large minnows trolled around reefs often accounting for larger specimens. The use of saltwater fly fishing to specifically target golden trevally has developed in recent years, especially over shallow, sandy flats. In these cases, a sinking line and leader is employed to not spook the fish in these shallow waters.

=== In aquaria ===
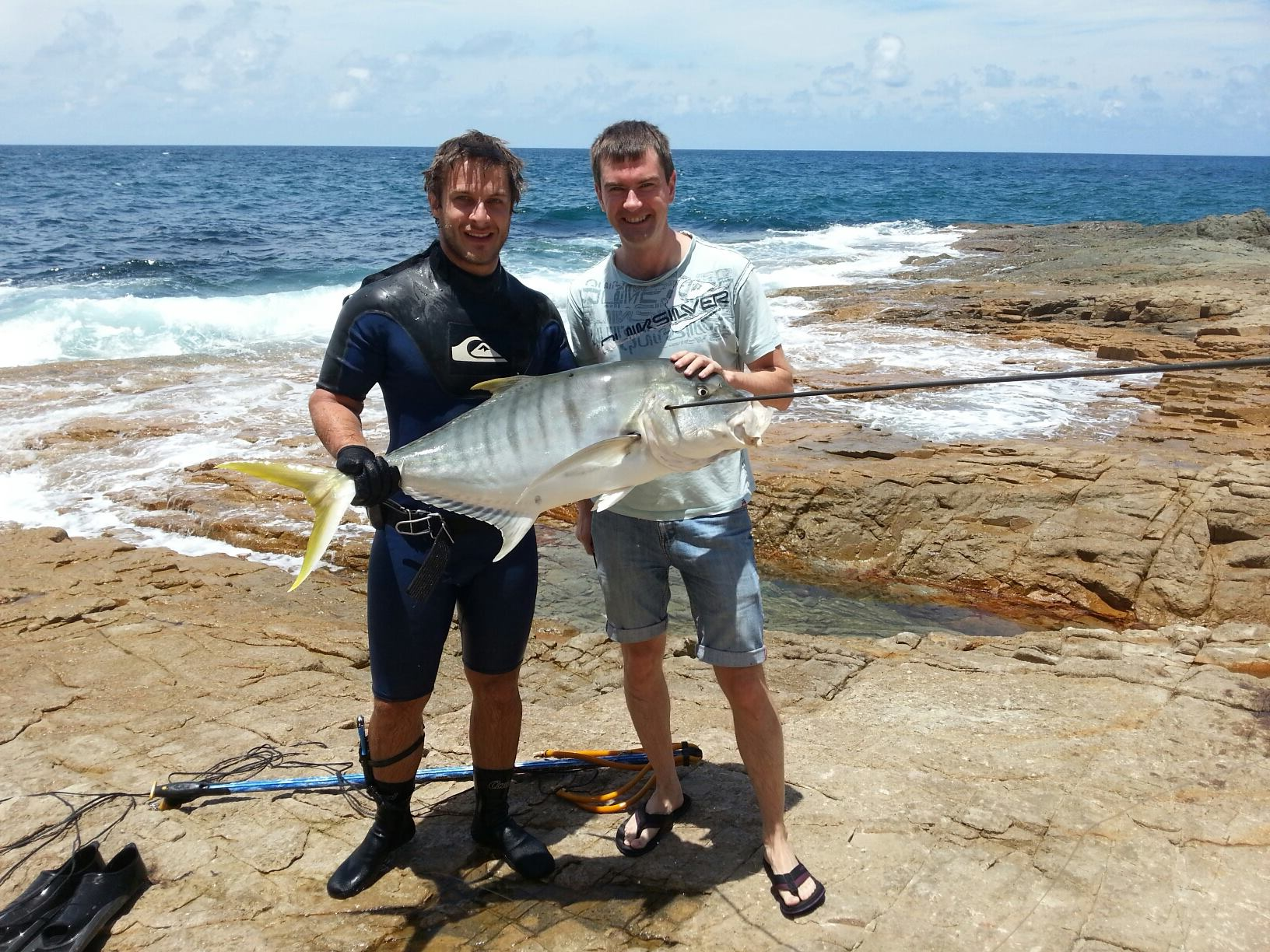
Fresh catch of golden trevally in town of 1770, Queensland, Australia

Juvenile golden trevally are often used in marine aquaria due to their vivid yellow colour and black banding, with larger individuals also kept in larger tanks. The development of laboratory culturing specifically for the aquarium trade has been achieved in Singapore.
