= Whetstone =

Whetstone may refer to:

== Tools and technology ==
- Whetstone, a sharpening stone used for knives and other cutting tools
- Hornfels, a type of stone sometimes called whetstone
- Whetstone (benchmark), a benchmark for measuring computing power
- Operation Whetstone, a nuclear test program in the 1960s

== Places ==
=== United Kingdom ===
- Whetstone, Leicestershire, a village and civil parish
- Whetstone, London, a suburb in Barnet
- Whetstones (stone circle), an ancient pagan monument in Powys, Wales

=== United States ===
- Whetstone, Arizona, a census-designated place
- Whetstone, West Virginia, an unincorporated community
- The Whetstone River in South Dakota and Minnesota
- Whetstone Gulf State Park in New York
- Whetstone High School (Columbus, Ohio), a high school located in the Clintonville neighborhood of Columbus, Ohio
- Whetstone Mountain in Colorado
- Whetstone Mountains in Arizona

== Other uses ==
- Whetstone (surname)

== See also ==
- Wheatstone (disambiguation)
