= Wheatstone =

Wheatstone may refer to:

- Cape Wheatstone, in Antarctica
- Charles Wheatstone (1802–1875), a British scientist and inventor, eponymous for Wheatstone bridge
- Cooke and Wheatstone Telegraph
- Wheatstone, New Zealand, a locality in the Canterbury region
- Wheatstone Glacier, in Antarctica
- Wheatstone LNG
- Wheatstone bridge, a measuring instrument in electricity
- Wheatstone Corporation, an American professional audio company

== See also ==
- Whetstone (disambiguation)
