= Simms Fishing Products =

American fishing equipment manufacturer

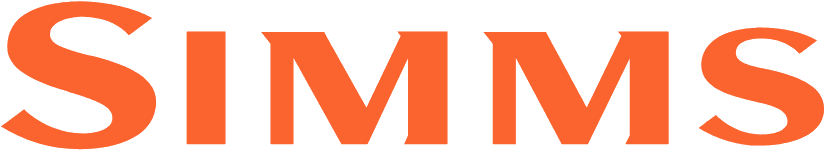
- Type: Private
- Industry: Fishing
- Founded: Jackson, Wyoming, (1980)
- Founder: John Simms
- Headquarters: Bozeman, Montana, United States
- Area served: Worldwide
- Key people: K.C. Walsh (President); Robert Gibson Director of Manufacturing & Operations; Diane Bristol Director of Marketing & Brand Management; Andy Wunsch Director of Sales & Service
- Products: Fishing equipment, accessories and apparel
- Website: simmsfishing.com

Simms Fishing Products is an American fishing equipment, accessories and apparel manufacturer in Bozeman, Montana.

== History ==
Simms was founded in 1980 by John Simms, a Jackson, Wyoming fishing guide and outfitter. John Simms established the company to manufacture a higher quality of waders and wading equipment than was available at the time. In the mid-1980s, John Simms introduced high quality neoprene waders to the U.S. market. John Simms later sold the company to Life-Link International, another Jackson-based sporting goods manufacturer.

In 1992, K.C. Walsh, a Los Angeles-based management consultant, acquired Simms from Life-Link and moved the business to Bozeman, Montana. Simms employs 115 people in Bozeman and consolidated its manufacturing facilities into a new single 62,000 square feet (5,800 m^{2}) facility in October 2013.

In early 2023, Vista Outdoor appointed Derek Tarlecki President of Simms Fishing Products.

== Products ==
Shortly after K.C. Walsh acquired the company and moved it to Bozeman, Simms introduced a line of breathable waders using Gore-Tex. Simms is the only U.S. and one of only three wader manufacturers in the world to have a license from W. L. Gore and Associates to use Gore-Tex in waders. Simms was one of the first wader manufacturers to produce waders specifically tailored to women fly fishers. In 2006, Simms introduced a high-end zippered wader, using waterproof zippers from the YKK Group in Tokyo. Although not the first ever zippered waders on the market, the Simms G4Z wader set a new standard for zippered waders.

In 2008 Trout Unlimited asked wader and boot manufacturers and anglers to eliminate the use of felt soled waders and boots to help combat the spread of invasive aquatic species. Shortly after, Simms announced that it would eliminate felt-soled waders and boots in its 2010 product line. Even though many states have banned the use of felt soled wading boots, Simms announced in July 2011 that they would re-introduce felt-soled wading boots because of high consumer demand.

Simms manufactures many kinds of men's and women's waders, boots, outerwear, apparel, and travel accessories for fishers and outdoors enthusiasts. It retails its products through a worldwide network of independent fly fishing shops, large sporting goods retailers and online retailers. In 2012, 30 percent of its sales were international and Simms maintains warehouses in Europe, Japan and New Zealand.

In 2022, Simms made a $50,000 donation to deal with flooding in Yellowstone National Park. This, and other donations, have been funded by Simms releasing special edition Watershed waders.

== Awards ==
Simms Fishing Products has won Field & Stream Magazine's Best of the Best award eight times since 1998 including awards for waders, wading boots, jackets and travel bags. In 2016, Simms was awarded the President's "E" Award in recognition of its export business.
