= Fishing tackle =

Equipment used for fishing

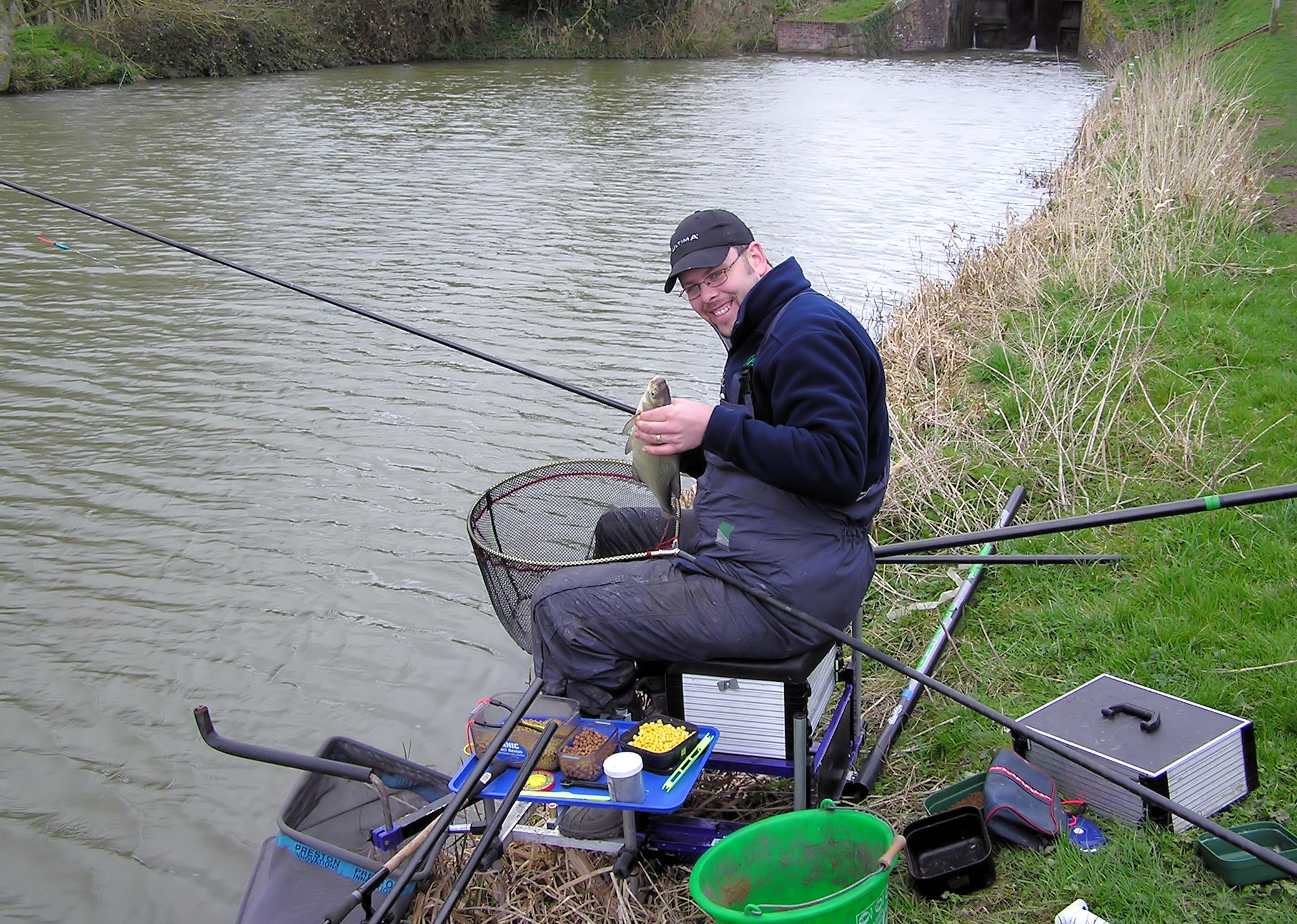
An angler on the Kennet and Avon Canal, England, surrounded by his tackle

A completed assembly of tackle ready for fishing is sometimes called a rig, such as this Carolina rig.

Fishing tackle is the equipment used by anglers when fishing. Almost any equipment or gear used in fishing can be called fishing tackle, examples being hooks, lines, baits/lures, rods, reels, floats, sinkers/feeders, nets, spears, gaffs and traps, as well as wires, snaps, beads, spoons, blades, spinners, clevises and tools that make it easy to tie knots.

Tackle attached to the end of a fishing line that gets cast out along with the bait are referred to as terminal tackle. Terminal tackle can include hooks, leaders, floats, sinkers/feeders, swivels and attached snaps and/or split rings. Sometimes the term "rig" is used for a specific assemblage of terminal tackle.

Fishing tackle can be contrasted with fishing technique. Fishing tackle refers to the physical equipment that is used when fishing, whereas fishing technique refers to the manner in which the tackle is used.

The term tackle, with the meaning "apparatus for fishing", has origins in the Netherlands from the late 14th century. Fishing tackle is also called fishing gear. However the term fishing gear is more usually used in the context of commercial fishing, whereas fishing tackle is more often used in the context of recreational fishing. This article covers equipment used by recreational anglers.

== Hook, line and sinker ==
Hook, line and sinker is a classic combination of tackle empowering an angler to catch fish.

=== Hooks ===
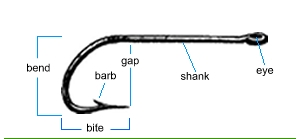
A fish hook

The use of the hook in angling is descended, historically, from what would today be called a "gorge". The word "gorge", in this context, comes from an archaic word meaning "throat". Gorges were used by ancient peoples to capture fish. A gorge was a long, thin piece of bone or stone attached by its midpoint to a thin line. The gorge would be fixed with a bait so that it would rest parallel to the lay of the line. When a fish swallowed the bait, a tug on the line caused the gorge to orient itself at right angles to the line, thereby sticking in the fish's gullet.

A fish hook is a device for catching fish either by impaling them in the mouth or, more rarely, by snagging the body of the fish. Fish hooks have been employed for millennia by anglers to catch fresh and saltwater fish. Early hooks were made from the upper bills of eagles and from bones, shells, horns and thorns of plants (Parker 2002). In 2005, the fish hook was chosen by Forbes as one of the top twenty tools in the history of man. Fish hooks are normally attached to some form of line or lure device which connects the caught fish to the angler. There is an enormous variety of fish hooks. Sizes, designs, shapes, and materials are all variable depending on the intended purpose of the hook. They are manufactured for a range of purposes from general fishing to extremely limited and specialized applications. Fish hooks are designed to hold various types of artificial, processed, dead or live baits (bait fishing); to act as the foundation for artificial representations of fish prey (fly fishing); or to be attached to or integrated into other devices that represent fish prey (lure fishing).

=== Lines ===
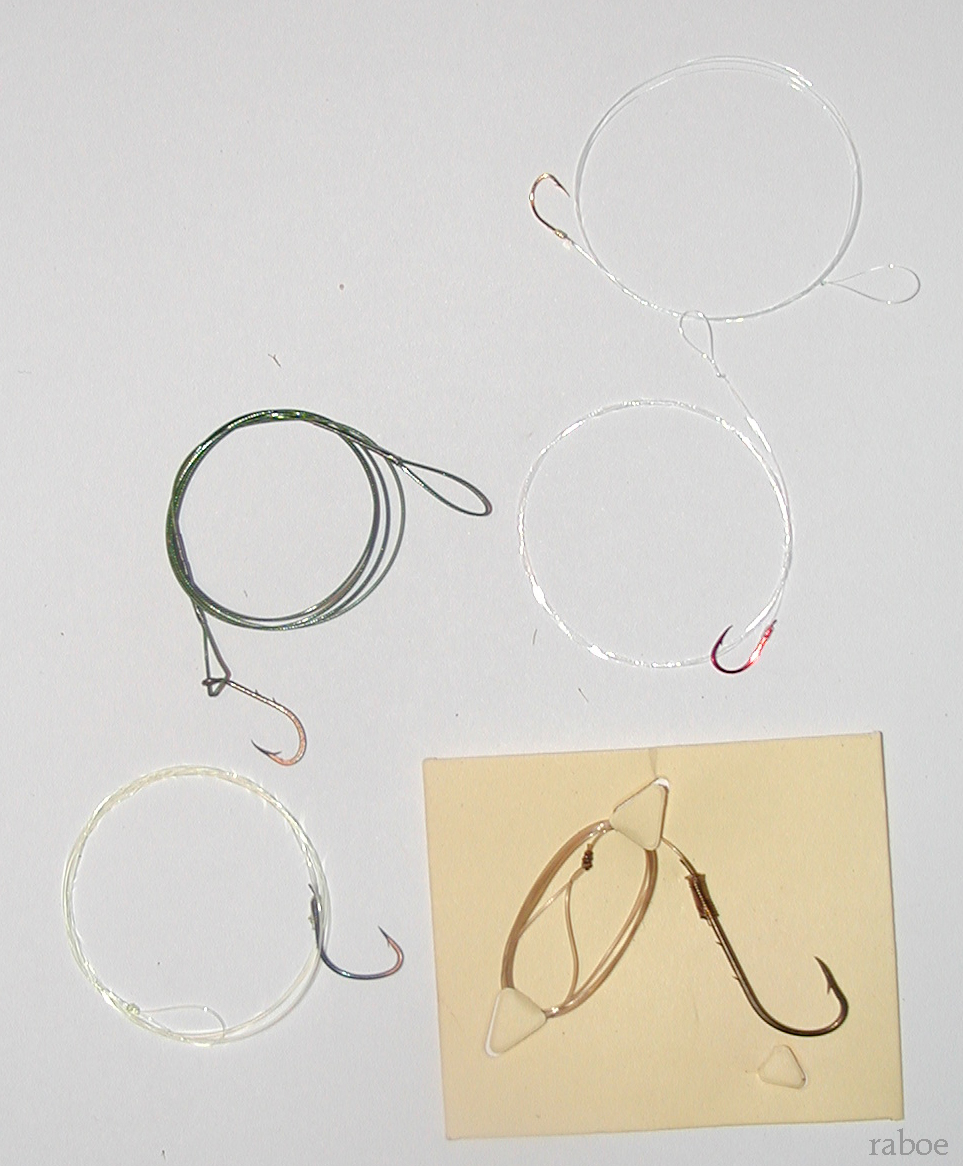
Fishing line with hooks attached

A fishing line is a cord used or made for fishing. The earliest fishing lines were made from leaves or plant stalk (Parker 2002). Later lines were constructed from horse hair or silk thread, with catgut leaders. From the 1850s, modern industrial machinery was employed to fashion fishing lines in quantity. Most of these lines were made from linen or silk, and more rarely cotton.

Modern lines are made from artificial substances, including nylon, polyethylene, dacron and dyneema. The most common type is monofilament made of a single strand. Anglers often use monofilament because of its buoyant characteristics and its ability to stretch under load. Recently alternatives such as fluorocarbon, which is the least visible type, and braided fishing line, also known as 'superlines' because of their small diameter, minimal amount of stretch, and great strength relative to standard nylon monofilament lines.

Important parameters of a fishing line are its breaking strength and its diameter (thicker, sturdier lines are more visible to fish). Factors that may determine what line an angler chooses for a given fishing environment include breaking strength, diameter, castability, buoyancy, stretch, color, knot strength, UV resistance, limpness, abrasion resistance, and visibility.

Fishing with a hook and line is called angling. In addition to the use of the hook and line used to catch a fish, a heavy fish may be landed by using a landing net or a hooked pole called a gaff. Trolling is a technique in which a fishing lure on a line is drawn through the water. Snagging is a technique where the object is to hook the fish in the body.

=== Sinkers ===
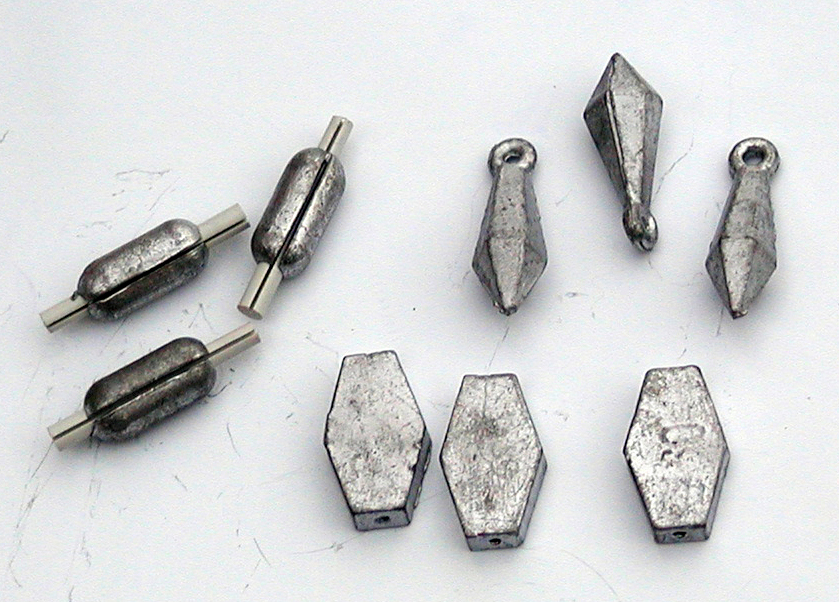
Three types of small lead sinkers

A sinker or plummet is a weight used when angling to force the lure or bait to sink more rapidly or to increase the distance that it may be cast. The ordinary plain sinker is traditionally made of lead. It can be practically any shape, and is often shaped round like a pipe-stem, with a swelling in the middle. However, the use of smaller lead based fishing sinkers has now been banned in the UK, Canada and some states in the US, since lead can cause toxic lead poisoning if ingested. There are loops of brass wire on either end of the sinker to attach the line. Weights can range from a quarter of an ounce for trout fishing up to a couple of pounds or more for sea bass and menhaden.

The swivel sinker is similar to the plain one, except that instead of loops, there are swivels on each end to attach the line. This is a decided improvement, as it prevents the line from twisting and tangling. In trolling, swivel sinkers are indispensable. The slide sinker, for bottom fishing, is a leaden tube which allows the line to slip through it, when the fish bites. This is an excellent arrangement, as the angler can feel the smallest bite, whereas in the other case the fish must first move the sinker before the angler feels him.

== Fishing rods ==
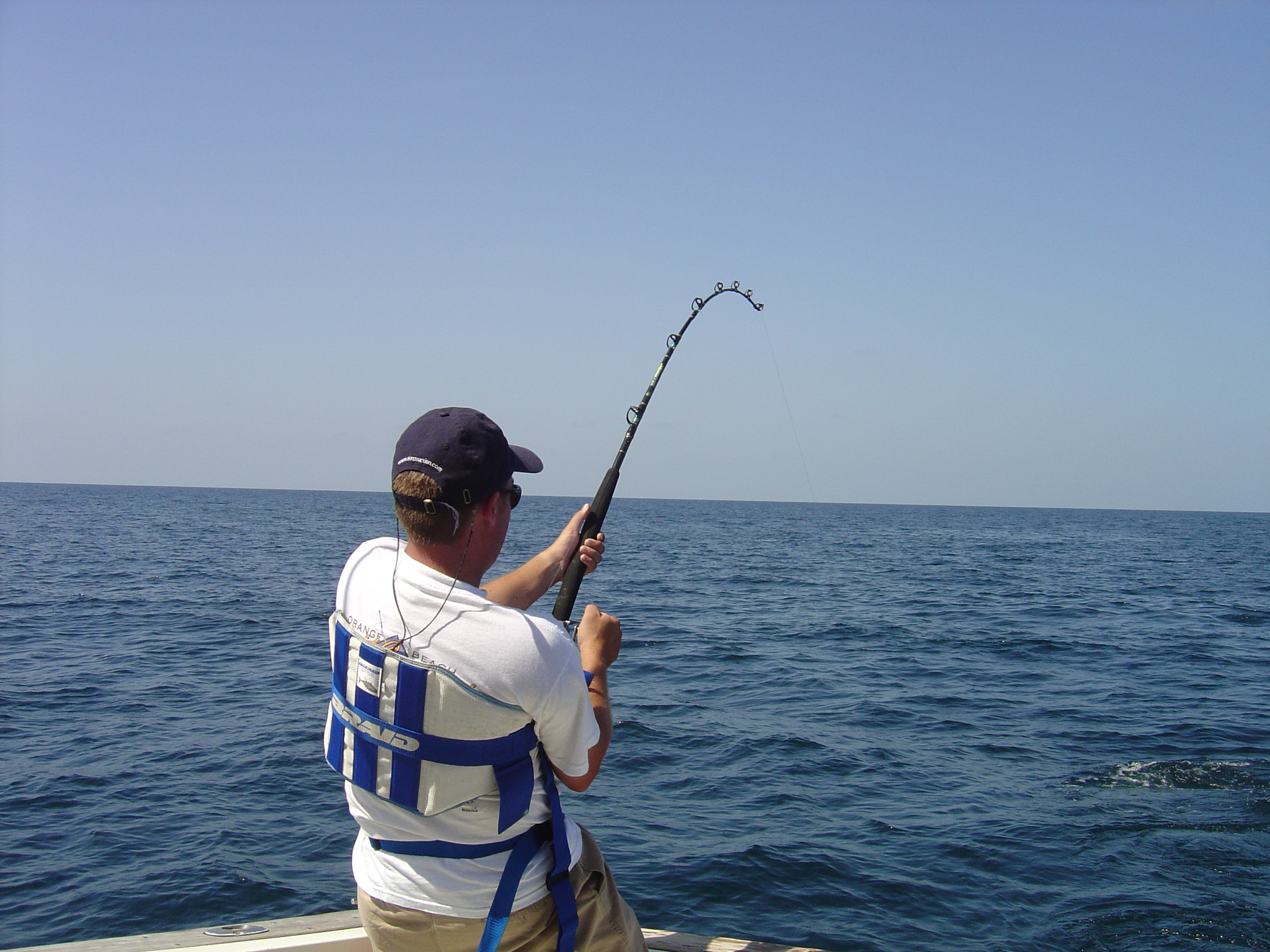
Fishing with a fishing rod

A fishing rod is an additional tool used with the hook, line and sinker. A length of fishing line is attached to a long, flexible rod or pole: one end terminates with the hook for catching the fish. Early fishing rods are depicted on inscriptions in ancient Egypt, China, Greece and Rome. In Medieval England they were called angles (hence the term angling). As they evolved they were made from materials such as split Tonkin bamboo, Calcutta reed, or ash wood, which were light, tough, and pliable. The butts were frequently made of maple. Handles and grips were made of cork, wood, or wrapped cane. Guides were simple wire loops.

Modern rods are sophisticated casting tools fitted with line guides and a reel for line stowage. They are most commonly made of fibreglass, carbon fibre or, classically, bamboo. Fishing rods vary in action as well as length, and can be found in sizes between 24 inches and 20 feet. The longer the rod, the greater the mechanical advantage in casting. There are many different types of rods, such as fly rods, tenkara rods, spin and bait casting rods, spinning rods, ice rods, surf rods, sea rods and trolling rods.

Fishing rods can be contrasted with fishing poles. The line on a fishing rod is controlled with a specialised reel which allows accurate casting. A fishing pole does not have a reel. Instead the line is just tied directly to the tip of the pole, or is tied to some sort of elastic mechanism at the tip. Poles can be up to 18 m in length and are made of optional sections which can be slotted together by the angler.

== Fishing reels ==
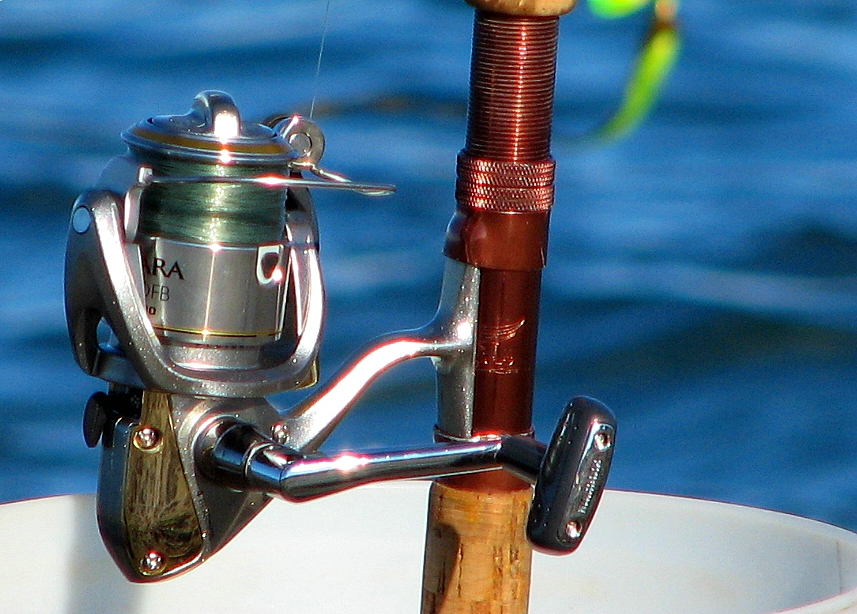
A spinning reel

A fishing reel is a device used for the deployment and retrieval of a fishing line using a spool mounted on an axle. Fishing reels are traditionally used in angling. They are most often used in conjunction with a fishing rod, though some specialized reels are mounted on crossbows or to boat gunwales or transoms. The earliest known illustration of a fishing reel is from Chinese paintings and records beginning about 1195 A.D. Fishing reels first appeared in England around 1650 A.D., and by the 1760s, London tackle shops were advertising multiplying or gear-retrieved reels. Paris, Kentucky, native George Snyder is generally given credit for inventing the first fishing reel in America around 1820, a bait casting design that quickly became popular with American anglers.

== Fishing bait ==
Natural baits

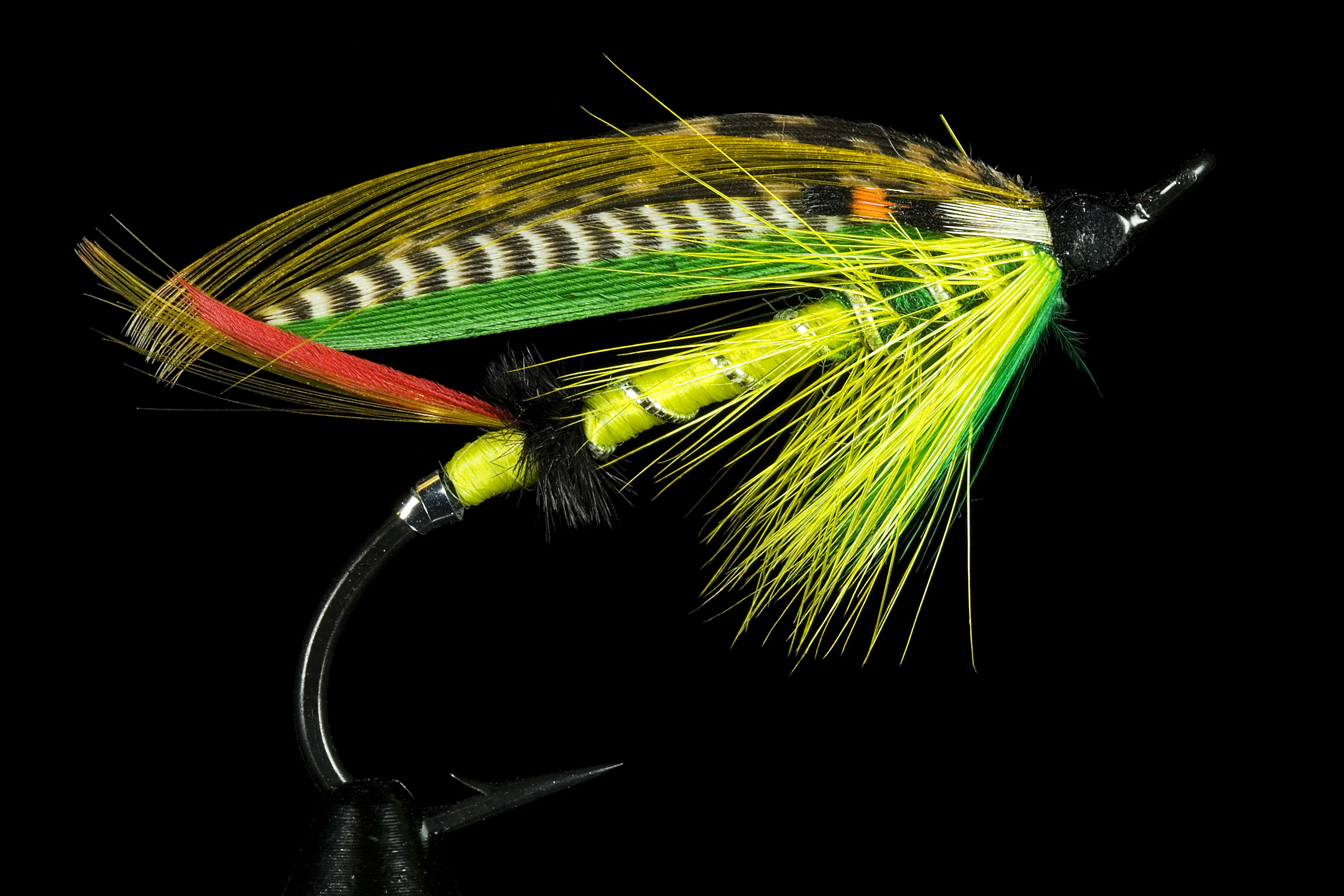
Green Highlander, an artificial fly used for salmon fishing

The natural bait angler usually uses a common prey species of the fish as an attractant. The natural bait used may be alive or dead. Common natural baits include bait fish, worms, leeches, minnows, frogs, salamanders, shrimp, nightcrawlers and other insects. Natural baits are effective due to the lifelike texture, odour and colour of the bait presented.

The common earthworm is a universal bait for fresh water angling. In the quest for quality worms, some fishers culture their own worm compost or practice worm charming. Grubs and maggots are also considered excellent bait when trout fishing. Grasshoppers, flies, bees and even ants are also used as bait for trout in their season, although many anglers believe that trout or salmon roe is superior to any other bait. Studies show that natural baits like croaker and shrimp are more recognized by the fish and are more readily accepted. A good bait for red drum is menhaden. Because of the risk of transmitting whirling disease, trout and salmon should not be used as bait.

Processed baits, such as groundbait and boilies, can work well with coarse fish, such as carp. For example, in lakes in southern climates such as Florida, fish such as bream will take bread bait. Bread bait is a small amount of bread, often moistened by saliva, balled up to a small size that is bite size to small fish.

Artificial baits

Many people prefer to fish solely with lures, which are artificial baits designed to entice fish to strike. The artificial bait angler uses a man-made lure that may or may not represent prey. The lure may require a specialised presentation to impart an enticing action as, for example, in fly fishing. Recently, electronic lures have been developed to attract fish. Anglers have also begun using plastic bait. A common way to fish a soft plastic worm is the Texas rig.

== Bite indicators ==
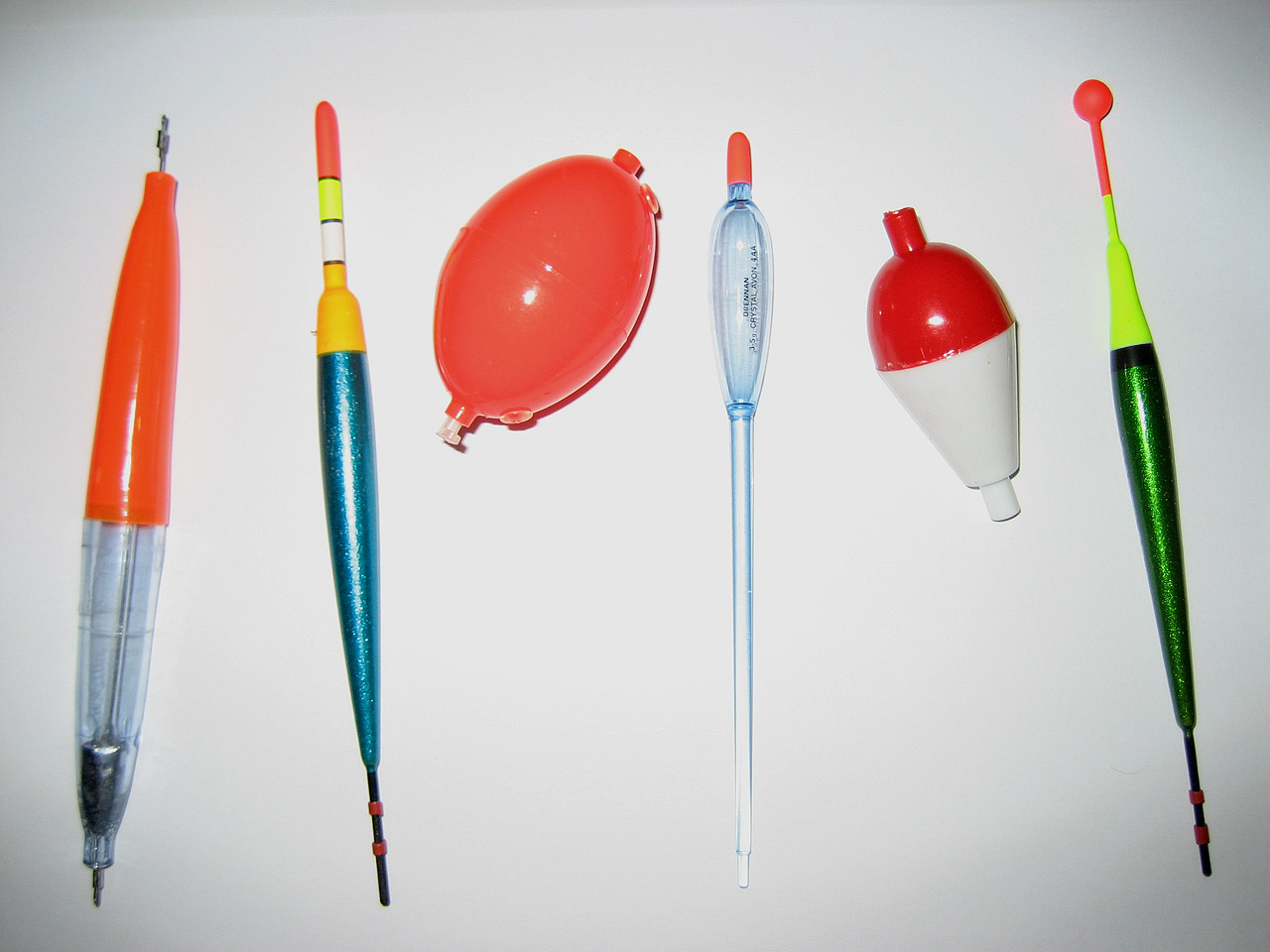
Different types of fishing floats

A bite indicator, also referred to as a strike indicator, is a mechanical or electronic device which indicates to an angler that something is happening at the hook end of the fishing line. There are many types of bite indicators—which work best depends on the type of fishing.

Devices in wide use as bite indicators include fishing floats, which float in the water and dart about if a fish bites, and quiver tips, which are mounted onto the tip of a fishing rod. Bite alarms are electronic devices which bleep when a fish tugs a fishing line. Floats and quiver tips are visual bite detectors, while bite alarms are audible bite detectors.

In fly fishing a commonly used indicator is the "hopper dropper rig". With this technique a nymph or wet fly is hung from the bottom of a floating dry fly.

== Spears ==
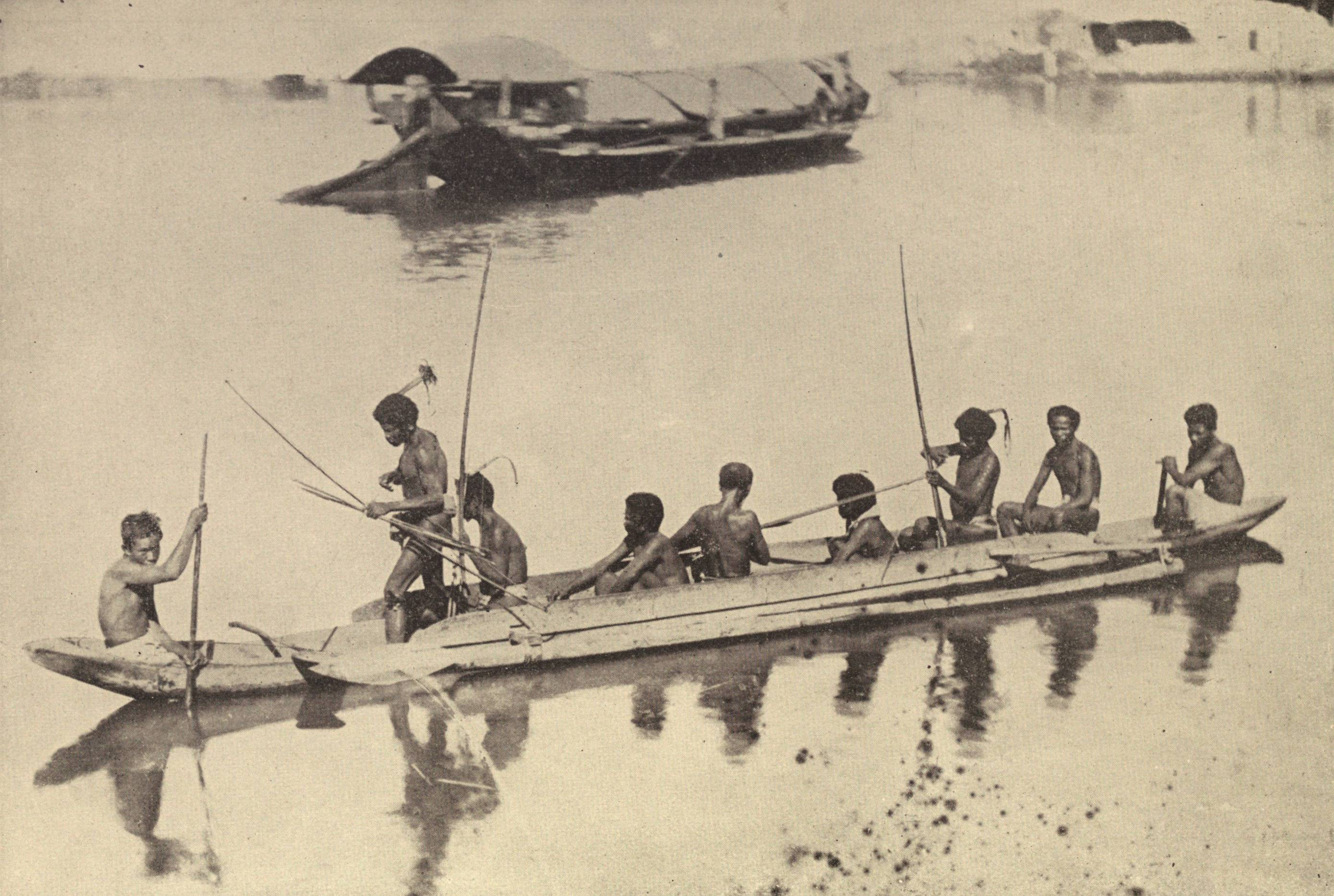
The Filipino Negritos traditionally used bows and arrows to shoot fish in clear water.

Spearfishing is an ancient method of fishing conducted with an ordinary spear or a specialised variant such as a harpoon, trident, arrow or eel spear.

Harpoons are spears which have a barb at the end. Their use was widespread in palaeolithic times. Cosquer cave in Southern France contains cave art over 16,000 years old, including drawings of seals which appear to have been harpooned. Tridents are spears which have three prongs at the business end. They are also called leisters or gigs. They feature widely in early mythology and history.

Modern spears can be used with a speargun. Some spearguns use slings (or rubber loops) to propel the spear. Polespears have a sling attached to the spear, Hawaiian slings have a sling separate from the spear, in the manner of an underwater bow and arrow.

A bow or crossbow can be used with arrows in bowfishing.

== Nets ==
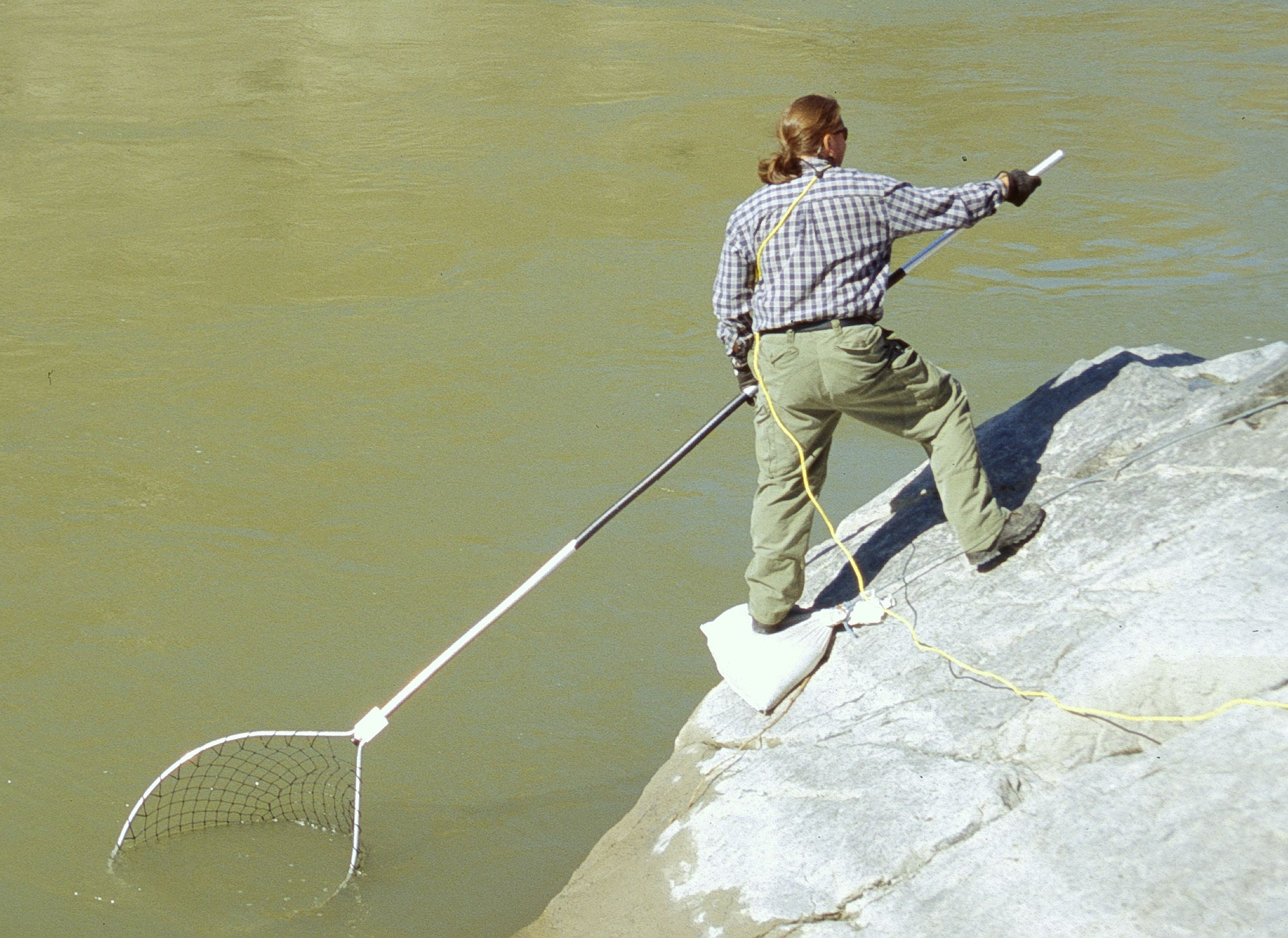
Fishing for salmon with a hand net on the Fraser River, Canada

Fishing nets are meshes usually formed by knotting a relatively thin thread. Between 177 and 180 the Greek author Oppian wrote the Halieutica, a didactic poem about fishing. He described various means of fishing including the use of nets cast from boats, scoop nets held open by a hoop, and various traps "which work while their masters sleep". Ancient fishing nets used threads made from leaves, plant stalk and cocoon silk. They could be rough in design and material but some designs were amazingly close to designs we use today (Parker 2002). Modern nets are usually made of artificial polyamides like nylon, although nets of organic polyamides such as wool or silk thread were common until recently and are still used.

Hand nets are held open by a hoop, and maybe on the end of a long stiff handle. They have been known since antiquity and may be used for sweeping up fish near the water surface like muskellunge and northern pike. When such a net is used by an angler to help land a fish it is known as a landing net. In the UK, hand-netting is the only legal way of catching glass eels and has been practised for thousands of years on the River Parrett and River Severn.

Cast nets are small round nets with weights on the edges which is thrown by the fisher. Sizes vary up to about four metres in diameter. The net is thrown by hand in such a manner that it spreads out on the water and sinks. Fish are caught as the net is hauled back in.

== Traps ==
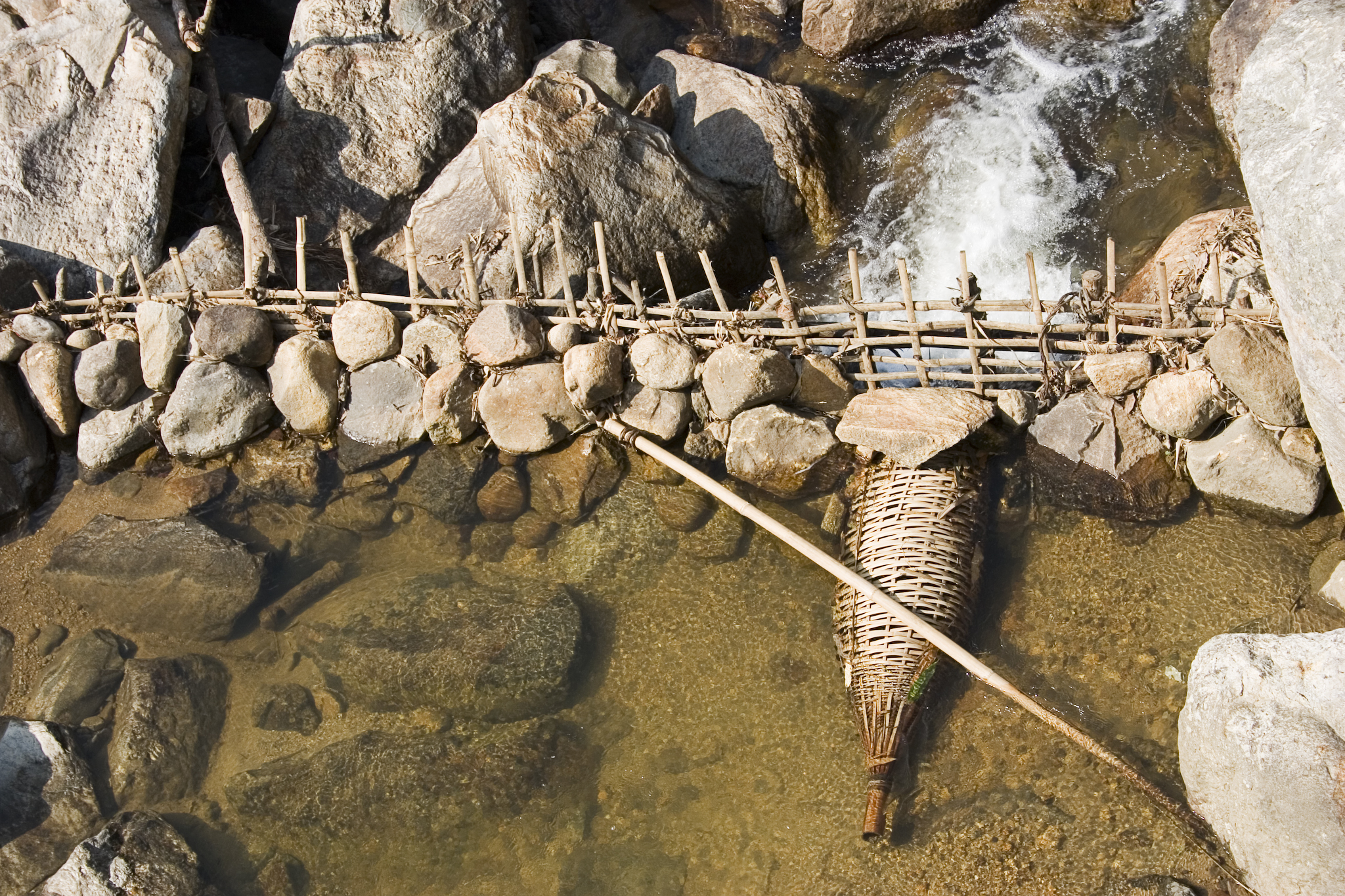
Vietnamese traditional fish trap

Fishing traps are culturally almost universal and seem to have been independently invented many times. There are essentially two types of trap, a permanent or semi-permanent structure placed in a river or tidal area and pot-traps that are baited to attract prey and periodically lifted. They might have the form of a fishing weir or a lobster trap. A typical trap can have a frame of thick steel wire in the shape of a heart, with chicken wire stretched around it. The mesh wraps around the frame and then tapers into the inside of the trap. When a fish swims inside through this opening, it cannot get out, as the chicken wire opening bends back into its original narrowness. In earlier times, traps were constructed of wood and fibre.

== Fish stringer ==
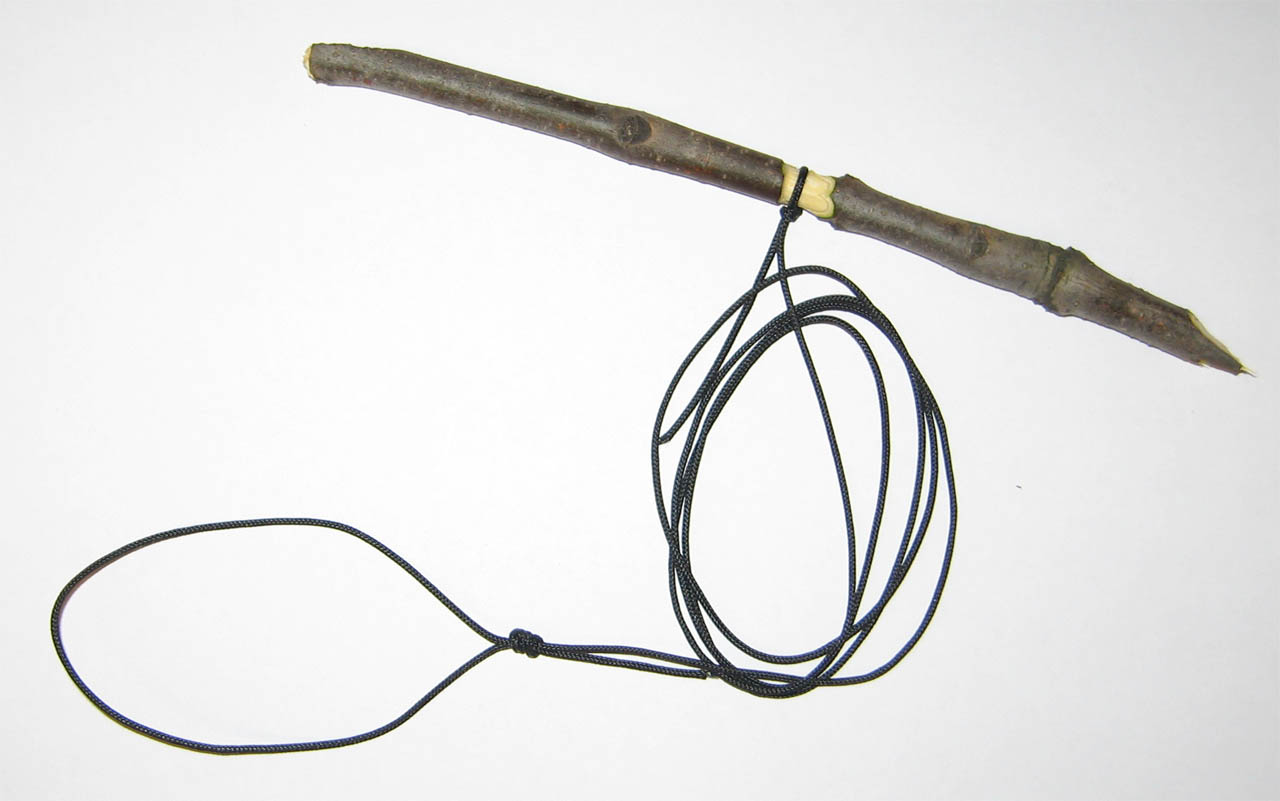
Simple fish stringer for spearfishing

A fish stringer is a line of rope or chain along which an angler can string fish that have been caught so they can be immersed and kept alive in water.

== Fly fishing tackle ==
Fly fishing tackle is equipment used by, and often specialised for use by fly anglers. Fly fishing tackle includes fly lines designed for easy casting, specialised fly reels designed to hold a fly line and supply drag if required for landing heavy or fast fish, specialised fly rods designed to cast fly lines and artificial flies, terminal tackle including artificial flies, and other accessories including fly boxes used to store and carry artificial flies.

== Tackle boxes ==
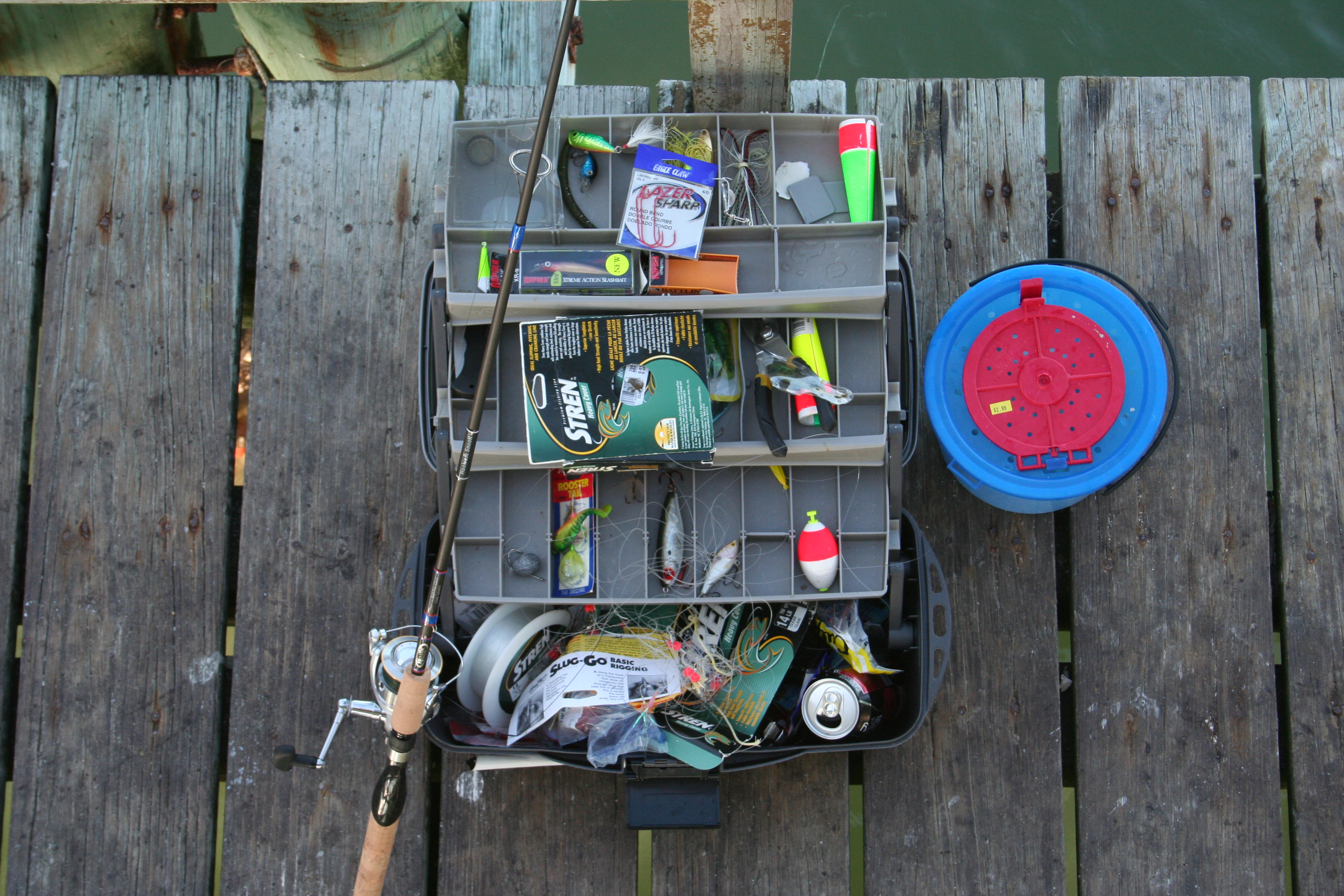
Typical tackle box with rod and bait bucket

Fishing tackle boxes have for many years been an essential part of the anglers equipment. Fishing tackle boxes were originally made of wood or wicker and eventually some metal fishing tackle boxes were manufactured. The first plastic fishing tackle boxes were manufactured by Plano in response to the need for a product that did not rust. Early plastic fishing tackle boxes were similar to tool boxes but soon evolved into the hip roof cantilever tackle boxes with numerous small trays for small tackle. These types of tackle boxes are still available today but they have the disadvantage that small tackle gets mixed up. Fishing tackle boxes have also been manufactured so the drawers themselves become small storage boxes, each with their own lids. This prevents small tackle from mixing, and can turn each drawer into a stand-alone container which can be used to carry small tackle to a rod some distance from the main tackle box.

== Tackle industry ==
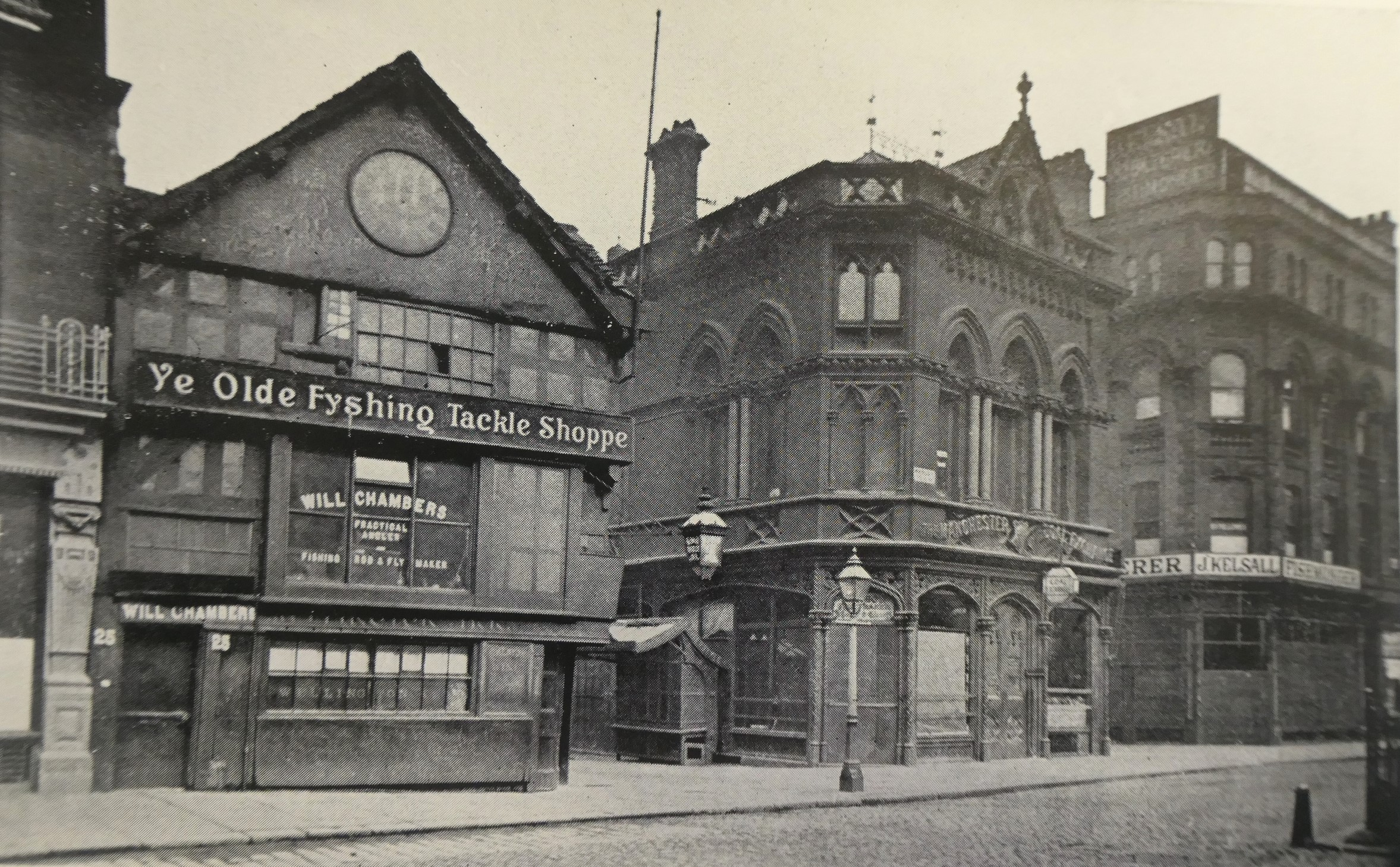
"Ye Olde Fyshing Tackle Shoppe", Market Place, Manchester, c. 1907

Worldwide, the recreational fishing tackle industry is worth over five billion US dollars annually, in the United States alone. Some major brands include The Shakespeare Company, Orvis, Lindy Legendary Fishing Tackle, and Simms Fishing Products. The industry in 2024 was worth $9.85 billion, and is led by a few dominant global companies notably Pure Fishing, Shimano, and Globeride (Daiwa), who "collectively represents the top tier of the market" and hold a significant combined market share. These companies benefit from having a wide portfolio and brand recognition built over decades, and a key strategy has been mergers and acquisitions that allowed them to absorb brands and technologies.
