= Whetstone (surname) =

Whetstone is a surname. Notable people with the surname include:

- George Whetstone (1544?–1587), English dramatist and author
- Peter Whetstone, American pioneer
- Rachel Whetstone (born 1968), public relations specialist
- William Whetstone (died 1711), British Royal Navy officer
