= Fly fishing tackle =

Fishing tackle used by fly fishers

Fly fishing tackle comprises the fishing tackle or equipment typically used by fly anglers. Fly fishing tackle includes:

- Artificial flies - ultralight fishing lure used to imitate flying insects and small crustaceans
- Fly rods - a specialized type of light fishing rod designed to cast fly line and artificial flies
- Fly reels - a specialized type of fishing reel designed to hold fly line and supply drag if required to land heavy or fast fish.
- Fly line - a specialized weighted fishing line that is designed to allow easy casting with a fly rod and interact with the water by either floating or sinking
- Terminal tackle used to connect the fly line to the artificial fly
- Accessories - tools, net, waders and apparel used by the fly angler for maintenance and preparation of tackle, dealing with the fish being caught, as well as personal comfort and safety while fly fishing. Includes fly boxes used to store and carry artificial flies.

== Fly rods ==
=== Sizes and usage ===
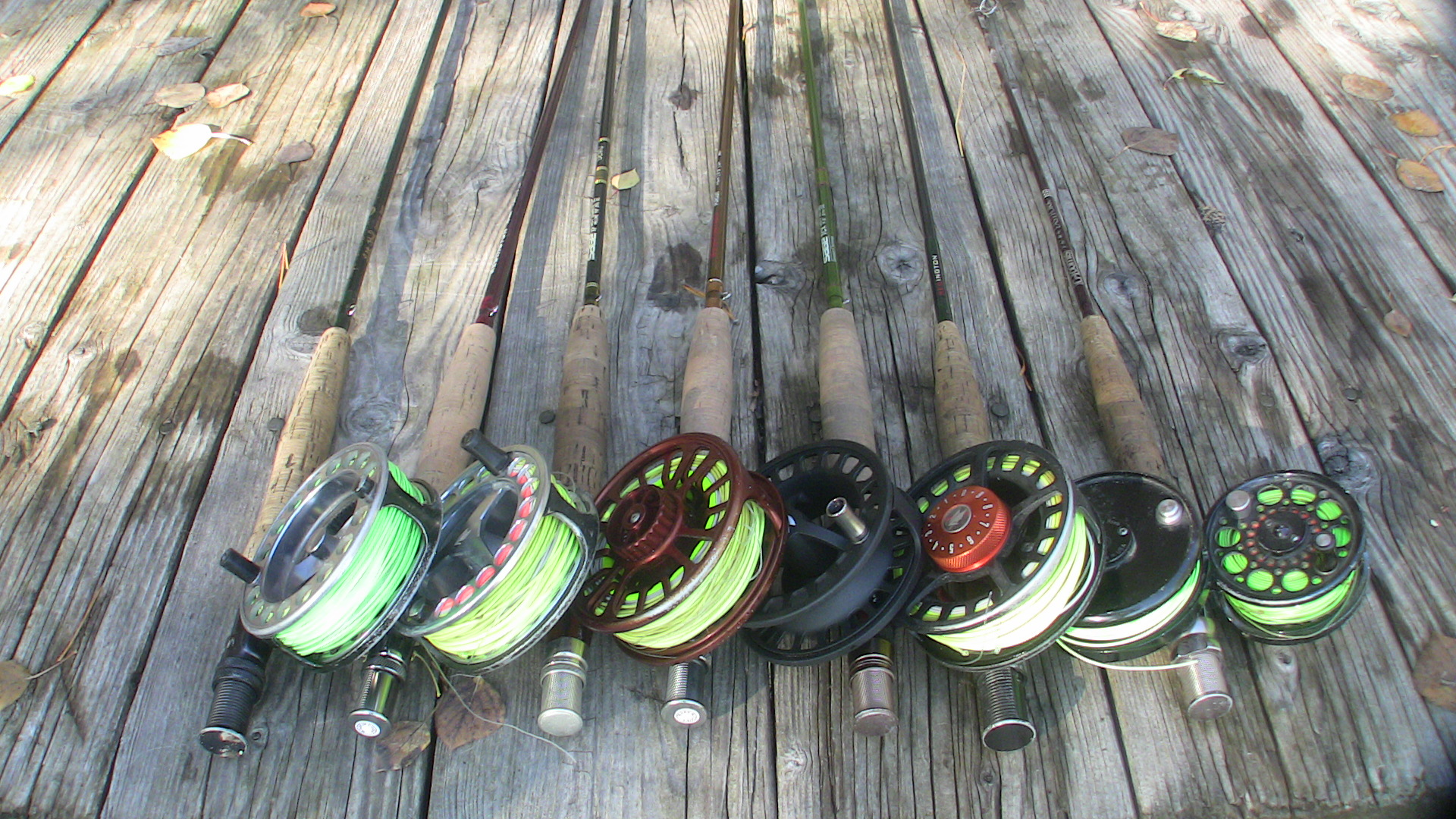
A variety of different brands and sizes of fly rods.

Fly rods normally vary between 2 m (6 ft) and 4 m (13 ft) in length with the most common length sold being 2.74 m (9 ft). Rod lengths are typically given in imperial measurements of feet and inches. Fly rods and lines are designated as to their "weight", typically written as Nwt where 'N' is the number (e.g. 8wt, 9wt, 10wt).

Rods are matched to the line according to weight. The rod's manufacturer will mark on the rod the fly line weights for which a rod has been designed. One-weight (1wt) rods and lines are the lightest; the weight designations increase in whole number increments as the rod becomes heavier. The heaviest rods and lines readily available currently are 16-weight (16wt). In general, 1wt through 2wt rods would be used for the cast small flies for small trout and panfish; 3wt and 4wt rods are popular for small-stream fishing; 5wt is often considered the all-around rod for trout and general freshwater fishing; 6wt and 7wt rods are used on large rivers and for fishing with streamers, for larger warmwater species, and occasionally in calm inshore conditions for smaller saltwater species; 8wt to 9wt rods and lines might be used for steelhead or salmon in medium rivers, as well as for bass fishing with large flies, fishing for large carp, and general inshore saltwater use; and 10-11wt rods and lines would be used for pursuing large saltwater gamefish (tarpon, snook) under conditions of high wind or surf. The heaviest rods (12–16wt) are mostly used for bluewater species (billfish, tuna) while fishing from a boat. The characteristics of these rods reflect the fact that only short casts are needed during this type of fly fishing, while lifting ability is at a premium.

The species pursued, under which conditions, will largely determine the weight of rod selected. Next, it is important to match the line to the weight of the rod. Using too heavy a line on too light on a rod, or vice versa, will dramatically affect casting performance. It may also permanently warp the rod blank. Generally speaking, you can safely go one line weight more or less (i.e. using an 8wt or 10wt line on a 9wt rod). There are also rods stamped with a range of weights. For example, a rod may be rated 7-8wt. This indicates the rod is designed for either a 7 or 8 weight fly line. There are also some rods rated for wider ranges (e.g. 8-9-10wt). The drawback to multi-rated rods is that compromises in flexibility or action are made in order to accommodate a wider range of line weights. For example, a rod rated for 8-9 weight line will be slightly stiffer than a straight 8wt but slightly softer than a straight 9wt rod. In general, the more expensive the rod, the more likely it'll be designated for a single line weight rather than a range.

Saltwater fly rods are built to handle powerful fish and to cast large, bulky flies over longer distances or into strong winds. Saltwater fly rods are normally fitted with heavier, corrosion-resistant fittings. The reel seat may also be equipped with a short extension often called a "fighting butt". Rods for saltwater fishing fall into the 8 to 15 weight class, with 12-weight being typical for most larger species like tuna, dorado (mahi-mahi) and wahoo (ono).

Note that the line weight generalities described above hold for both single-handed fly rods as well as double-handed fly rods used for Spey Casting, but the length and usage of double-handed rods often varies significantly.

=== Bamboo and split cane ===
The earliest fly rods were made from greenheart, a tropical wood, and later bamboo originating in the Tonkin area of Guangdong Province in China. The mystical appeal of handmade split-cane rods has endured despite the emergence over the last 50 years of cheaper rod-making materials that offer more durability and performance: fiberglass and carbon fiber.

Split-cane bamboo fly rods combine sport, history and art. It may take well over 100 hours for an experienced rod builder to select and split the raw cane and then to cure, flame, plane, file, taper, glue, wrap and finish each rod. Quality rods made by famous rod makers may sell for prices well beyond US$2,000; a new rod from a competent, contemporary builder may sell for nearly as much. These rods offer strength. Bamboo rods vary in action from slow to fast depending on the taper of the rod. In competent hands, they provide the pinnacle in performance.

=== Synthetic fly rods ===
Today, fly rods are mainly made from carbon fiber/graphite with cork or, less frequently, hypalon being favored for the grip. Such rods generally offer greater stiffness than bamboo, are much more consistent and less expensive to manufacture, and require less maintenance. Fiberglass was popular for rods constructed in the years following World War II and was the "material of choice" for many years. However, by the late 1980s, carbon/graphite composite rods (including premium graphite/boron and graphite/titanium blends) had emerged as the materials used by most fly rod manufacturers. These premium rods offer a stiffness, sensitivity, and feel unmatched by any other synthetic material. Graphite composites are especially well-suited to the construction of multi-piece rods since the joints, known as ferrules, in better-quality graphite rods do not significantly affect overall flex or rod action. Today's modern carbon graphite composite fly rods are available in a wide range of sizes and types, from ultralight trout rods to bass fishing rods and two-handed "spey" rods.

== Fly lines ==
Fly line is a specialized fishing line that supplies the weight or mass necessary to cast an artificial fly with a fly rod. The first fly lines were constructed of woven horsehair that eventually evolved into woven silk fiber lines. As plastics technologies improved, synthetic materials gradually replaced natural materials in the construction of fly lines. Today's fly lines are generally constructed of an outside synthetic layer that determines the line's slickness, buoyancy, shape and weight over an inside core material which determines the line's strength and flexibility. The typical fly line is 90 feet (27 m) long although longer fly lines are manufactured. Fly lines have several characteristics which can be used to describe any given fly line. Some of these characteristics are based on industry standards and norms while others vary considerably between manufacturers.

- Taper – Taper describes the change in cross-sectional diameter of a fly line from one end to another. Taper is a significant determinant in the casting performance of an individual fly line particularly the ability to present different types of artificial flies from the very delicate to the heavy and wind resistant in differing on-water conditions. Fly lines in general are said to be:
  - Weight forward taper – the cross-sectional diameter changes from smaller to larger to small within the front 30 feet (9.1 m) of the fly line. Weight forward taper lines have only one end to which the leader is attached.
  - Double taper – the cross-sectional diameter changes from smaller to larger to smaller symmetrically along the entire length of the fly line. Double taper fly lines may be reversed by the angler with the leader being attached to either end of the line.
  - Level – the cross-sectional diameter is identical along the entire length of the fly line.
  - Shooting heads –Shooting heads and tips are level or tapered sections of fly line designed for exceptionally long distance casting.
- Weight – Fly line weight is an industry standard measure of the actual weight in grains of the first 30 feet (9.1 m) or 9.1 meters of fly line. Fly rods are designed to cast fly lines of a specific weight. Fly line weights vary from 1 weight to 15 weight using standards originally established by the American Fishing Tackle Manufacturers Association and adopted by the American Fly Fishing Trade Association (AFFTA). A 5 weight fly line is designed to match up with a 5 weight fly rod. These relationships are not absolute and anglers may prefer to over-line or under-line any given rod depending on their casting style and rod action. Some sinking and sink-tip fly lines do not carry a numbered weight, but instead are identified by the actual weight in grains of the first 30 feet (9.1 m) of line, such as a 250-grain (16 g) sinking line.

AFFTA standard fly line weights (grains per first 30 feet (9.1 m) of line)
| Designation | Weight (grains) | Acceptable range (grains) |
|---|---|---|
| 1wt | 60 | 54–66 |
| 2wt | 80 | 74–86 |
| 3wt | 100 | 94–106 |
| 4wt | 120 | 114–126 |
| 5wt | 140 | 134–146 |
| 6wt | 160 | 152–168 |
| 7wt | 185 | 177–193 |
| 8wt | 210 | 202–218 |
| 9wt | 240 | 230–250 |
| 10wt | 280 | 270–290 |
| 11wt | 330 | 318–342 |
| 12wt | 380 | 368–392 |
| 13wt | 450 | 435–465 |
| 14wt | 500 | 485–515 |
| 15wt | 550 | 535–565 |

- Buoyancy – Typical fly lines have a buoyancy characteristic that describes how the line behaves on the water after being cast.
  - Floating – Floating fly line is designed to float on the surface of the water along its entire length. Floating fly line is essential for presentation of artificial flies that must remain on the surface such as dry flies, poppers, bugs, etc. Floating fly line is also necessary to fish nymphs effectively with strike indicators.
  - Sink-Tip – Sink Tip fly line is designed so that some length of the tip section of the fly line sinks while the remainder of the fly line floats. Sink Tips are generally characterized by a sink rate in inches per seconds and are used when it is necessary to get artificial flies deeper in the water column.
  - Sinking – Sinking fly line is designed to sink along the entire length of fly line and is typically used in fly fishing deep waters or where the artificial fly must reach the bottom of the water column rapidly.

Fly line manufacturers design and formulate their fly lines with other characteristics as well. Some fly lines are specifically formulated for warm water and cold water conditions, fresh and salt water conditions as well as designs that target a specific type or fish or fishing.

=== Backing ===
Fly line is typically attached to a length of braided or gelspun line wound on the fly reel known as backing. The length and breaking strength of the backing required depends on the overall line capacity of the reel and the type of fish being sought. Backing may be as short as a few yards up to hundreds of yards if the reel has the capacity. Backing can serve two purposes. One is to create a larger diameter spooling surface that allows the fly line to fill the entire fly reel. The other is to provide additional line for fighting heavy or hard fighting fish. A fast running or hard fighting fish may take line from the reel and get into the backing.

== Terminal tackle ==
Terminal fly fishing tackle connects the fly line to the artificial fly. This is typically a tapered or level ‘’leader’’ with a ‘’tippet’’ section. Other terminal tackle may include small ‘’strike indicators’’ or weights added to the leader to assist in strike detection and presentation. The leader is a section of fishing line that is attached directly to the end of the fly line. The ‘’tippet’’ section is a section of fishing line attached to the leader to which the artificial fly is attached. Leaders and tippets play a key role in the presentations of the fly to the fish and the subsequent landing of a fish when caught. Leaders and tippets are generally constructed of monofilament or fluorocarbon fishing line. In some fly fishing situations involving toothy fish, tippets are constructed of braided or single strand stainless steel wire.

=== Tapered leaders ===
The tip of a fly line is usually more than 0.030" thick and the eye of a fly hook may be less than a tenth that size. The two must be joined by a "leader," usually 7 to 10 feet long, nowadays of nylon or similar monofilament, either extruded in a continuous taper or made by knotting together several lengths of nylon of diminishing thickness. These taper from about 0.020" diameter to 0.010" for a large fly or 0.007" for a size 14 trout fly. The right size and stiffness of nylon also helps the leader "turn over" when cast, so as to present the fly naturally, as if not connected with a fishing rod. Anglers usually carry spools of extra fine nylon, to replace the tippet or other sections of a leader as required.

=== Level leaders and sink tips ===
Level leaders are a single diameter of line that connects the fly line to the tippet or fly. Level leaders are typically much shorter than tapered leaders and used with sinking fly lines and heavy flies. Level leaders when used with sinking lines help get the fly deeper faster.

=== Tippets ===
The tippet connects the leader to the fly. Tippet sizes were traditionally expressed as X sizes in a scale based on silkworm gut leader material, but nowadays gut has been superseded by a variety of synthetics, mainly monofilaments. Monofilament is calibrated in thousandths of an inch from 0.020" and larger (used for leader butts or in saltwater fishing) to 0.011" (old size 0X) and as small as 0.003" (8X.) Fly fishing records are classed by tippet diameter, not breaking strength, which varies between material and manufacturers. Choice of tippet involves a tradeoff: finer tippets are less visible to the fish, resulting in more strikes, but are more easily abraded and broken. Stiffer or softer tippets may be used depending on water temperature, visibility, and need for abrasion resistance. Some toothy species require specially strong and durable tippets so they will not be bitten through, called shock tippets, made of thick monofilament or stainless steel wire.

=== Strike indicators and leader weight ===
- Strike indicators – Small floating cork, yarn, or foam devices attached to the leader at some point (typically 12” – 48”) above the fly to assist in the detection of strikes while fly fishing with nymphs or other wet flies.
- Leader weight – Small amounts of lead or tungsten shot, putty or ribbon are applied to a leader fly to sink the fly to the proper depth. Leader weight may be used in combination with strike indicators while fishing nymphs.

== Accessories ==
Accessories include an abundance of different tools and gadgets used by fly anglers to maintain and prepare their tackle, deal with fish being caught and personal clothing and apparel specifically designed for fly fishing comfort and safety. Accessories include fly boxes designed to store and carry artificial flies.

=== Tools and Gadgets ===
- Floatant - A liquid, paste, powder, or other dry agent typically applied to artificial flies in dry fly fishing. Floatants prevent waterlogging or desiccate waterlogged flies.
- Wetting Agent - A liquid design to cause the sinking of flies and leaders.
- Knot tying tools - Tools used to assist in the tying of fly fishing knots to include the knotting of flies to tippets.
- Tippet holder - A mechanism to hold one or more small spools of tippet material used in fly fishing leaders. Fly anglers typically carry a variety of tippet sizes at one time.
- Nippers - A small clipping tool used to cut tippet material and other fishing lines cleanly.
- Hemostats - Used to remove hooks from the mouths of fish and other clamping tasks.
- Pliers - Used for a variety of tasks—safely remove hooks, tighten knots, crimp sleeves, cut leaders and line and connect wires.
- Jaw grippers - Used to handle and control larger fish safety by their lower lip, and to maintain a safe distance from sharp teeth.
- Thermometer - Fly anglers use thermometers to determine the water temperature of the water they are fishing.
- Landing net - A handheld net used to assist in the landing of fish caught by the fly angler. Landing nets are typically constructed of cord or rubber mesh and facilitate catch and release angling.
- Lanyards - Lanyards are used to hold a variety of tools and gadgets around the angler's neck, or to tether gear to the angler to avoid loss.
- Retractable gear keepers - used to organize individual tools and gadgets while keeping them accessible on the water without risk of loss
- Hook sharpeners - Sharpening steels are used to sharpen fish hooks while on the water.
- Fly patches - Fly patches are made of pieces of wool or foam to hold flies while they dry.
- Magnifiers - Used to assist threading fine tippets and tying on small flies on the water.
- Flashlight / Headlamp - Many anglers fish before sunrise or after dark, so artificial lights are used to tie knots and navigate.
- Wading staff - Some anglers carry sticks or purpose-made collapsible wading staffs to provide support while wading among slippery rocks in fast-flowing rivers.
- Microtrash container - for collecting small pieces of cut tippit or other waste to avoid it being dumped into the environment

=== Clothing and Apparel ===
- Fishing gloves - Fly anglers use a variety of gloves to protect their hands from the cold, the sun and from damage by handling toothy fish.
- Fishing hats - Fly anglers often wear brimmed hats for sun protection, to provide shade to aid spotting fishing in the water, to advertise, to store flies, and to mount magnifying glasses and/or headlamps
- Fishing neckgear - Saltwater anglers frequently wear purpose-made quick-dry fabric sleeves as sun protection for the head, neck and face
- Stripping guards - Prevents grooves and cuts on your stripping finger.
- Fishing packs - There are a wide variety of small to large packs specifically designed for fly anglers that are used to carry accessories, supplies and other gear while on the water. These include fanny packs, backpacks and chest packs.
- Fishing vests - There are a wide variety of vests specifically designed for fly anglers that are used to carry accessories, supplies and other gear while on the water.
- Waders - Waders are used to keep anglers dry while wading or otherwise in contact with water such as kayaking. Waders may be chest high, hip high, or merely tall boots. Waders may be stocking foot requiring the use of a wading boot or shoe or have integrated boot feet. Contemporary waders are either made of breathable Gore-Tex or neoprene. Waders also provide some insulation against cold temperatures.
- Wading boots - Wading boots provide protection for the angler's feet and typically have some form of gripping mechanism on the sole to provide a margin of safety on slippery surfaces. This mechanism may be made of felt, felt with metal studs, sticky rubber lugs, or synthetic felts. Boots made for saltwater wading may have stiff soles to avoid puncture by coral and provide support for long wades across shallow flats.
- Personal flotation devices - Some fly anglers wear PFDs when fishing in dangerous waters or where required by law.
- Polarized sunglasses - Protects angler's eyes from the sun's rays and provides better underwater visibility while fishing.

=== Fly boxes ===
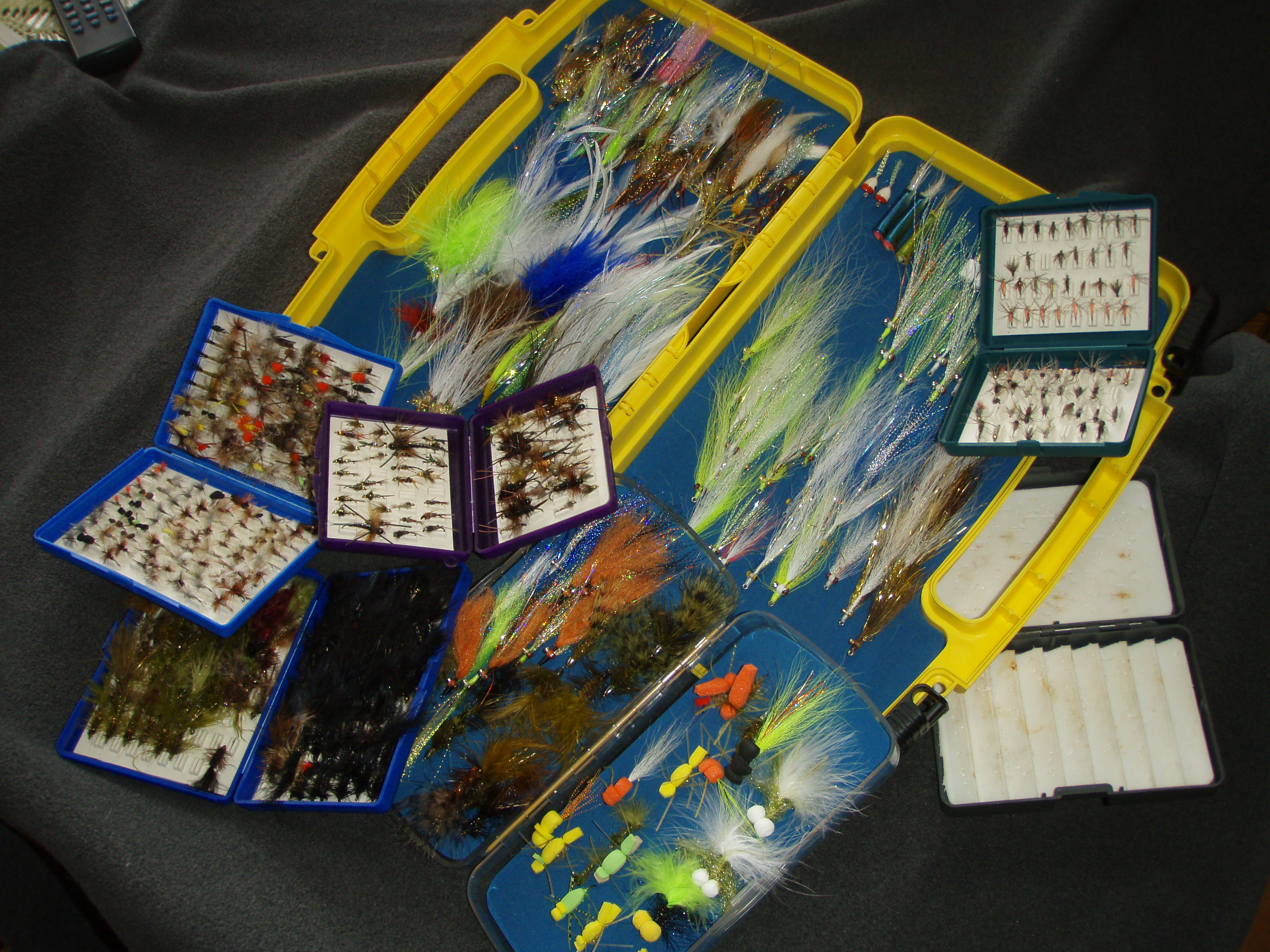
An assortment of fly boxes with trout, warmwater and saltwater flies

Fly boxes are designed to store and carry artificial flies in an organized manner. The typical fly angler carries one or more fly boxes while fly fishing. Fly boxes are available in a wide variety of sizes, styles and configurations. Fly boxes store flies using a variety of foam, plastic, silicone, clip, metal and other locking mechanisms. Probably the most famous fly boxes are made in England by Richard Wheatley who have been manufacturing these since 1860 and may be the oldest continuous makers of fly fishing tackle in the world. The firm sold the Companion to Alfred Ronald's Flyfisher's Entomology for decades, a novel fly case developed by Alfred Ronalds in 1844 which included brief instructions on the use of each recommended fly. Some anglers use fly wallets made of leather or cloth with a sherpa wool interior to hold flies. Fly wallets are particularly popular amongst fly anglers targeting steelhead with streamers.

== See also ==
- Bibliography of fly fishing
