= Lindy Legendary Fishing Tackle =

American producer of fishing tackle

Lindy Legendary Fishing Tackle is an American producer of fishing tackle. Since its founding in 1968, the company's Lindy Rig has been used by over 40 million fishermen.

== History ==
Lindy Tackle Company was founded in 1968 by Al and Ron Lindner and Nick Adams. The Lindners left the company to form In-Fisherman in 1975.

The first major expansion came in 1973 with Lindy's takeover by Ray-O-Vac and its merger with Mille Lacs Manufacturing to form Lindy-Little Joe. This company was incorporated in 1978 to acquire the Fishing Tackle Division of Ray-O-Vac.

Thill Fishing Tackle, maker of balsa floats, was acquired in 1992, and further acquisitions followed with System Tackle Manufacturing in 1997, Old Bayside Fishing Tackle in 2003, and Muskie Greats Tackle (G/T) in 2004. The addition of System tackle and Old Bayside added extensive ice fishing and inshore saltwater products to Lindy's product line. In 2005, Beckman Nets and Drift Control drift socks were also added to the product line.

In late February 2008, Lindy was purchased by PRADCO Outdoor Brands, a subsidiary of EBSCO Industries.

== Products ==
Lindy Tackle Company produces its namesake "Lindy Rig", as well as slip-sinkers, jigs, blade-bait rigs, ice fishing spoons, and ice fishing jigs. Each of its subsidiaries produces a different set of fishing tackle: M/G produces tackle geared for larger fish such as muskie and northern pike; Munchies produces soft plastic baits; Thill Gold Medal produces a range of bobbers and float; Beckman Nets produces lfish-landing nets; Drift Control produces a variety of drift socks; Old bayside produces a wide range of inshore saltwater angling tackle.
