= Globeride =

Japanese company

Globeride, Inc.
- Native name: グローブライド株式会社
- Type: Public KK
- Traded as: TYO: 7990
- ISIN: JP3503800009
- Industry: Sports equipment
- Founded: 1958; 68 years ago
- Headquarters: Higashikurume, Tokyo, 203-8511, Japan
- Area served: Worldwide
- Key people: Akihiko Kishi (Chairman); Kazunari Suzuki (President)
- Products: Fishing equipment; Golf equipment; Tennis equipment; Cycle sports goods
- Revenue: ▲JPY 85.7 billion (FY 2017) (US$ 808 million) (FY 2017)
- Net income: ▲JPY 2.5 billion (FY 2017) (US$ 23.5 million) (FY 2017)
- Number of employees: 5,848 (consolidated, as of March 31, 2018)
- Website: www.globeride.co.jp

Globeride, Inc. (グローブライド株式会社, Gurōburaido Kabushiki-gaisha), formerly Daiwa Seiko Corporation (ダイワ精工株式会社, Daiwa Seiko Kabushiki-gaisha) until 2009, is a Japanese manufacturing company that produces fishing equipment in addition to tennis, golf and biking gears. Globeride's fishing products, sold under the Daiwa brand, account for the majority of its sales, including rods, reels, lines and fishing-related apparels (such as polarized sunglasses). The company also offers licensed Prince brand tennis gear, G-III brand golf gear, Bottecchia bicycles and other outdoor products.

Founded by engineer Yoshio Matsui (松井義男, 1906-1983) in 1955 as Matsui Manufacturing (松井製作所, Matsui Seisaku-sho) and then formally established in 1958 as Daiwa Precision Works Corporation (大和精工株式会社, Daiwa Seiko Kabushiki-gaisha), the company renamed itself Globeride on October 1, 2009. The company operates from offices throughout Japan and internationally from subsidiaries in Australia, France, Germany, Mainland China and Taiwan, Thailand, the United Kingdom and the United States. The British subsidiary, Daiwa Sports Ltd., was established in 1977 and production commenced the following year with the production of fishing rods and golf clubs.

== Brands ==
Globeride has fishing (Edwin, Snow Peak, Daiwa), golf (Fourteen, Roddio, G-III, ONOFF), racket sports (Prince) and cycle sports brands (Bottecchia, Focus Bikes, Corratec) in its portfolio.

== See also ==
- ABU Garcia
- Comparison of hub gears
- Penn Reels
- Shimano
