= Fishing reel =

Hand-cranked reel used in angling to stow fishing line

Parts of a spinning reel: 1: Pick up or bail 2: Reel seat 3: Reel foot 4: Handle 5: Support arm 6: Anti-reverse lever 7: Skirted spool 8: Fishing line 9: Drag adjustment knob

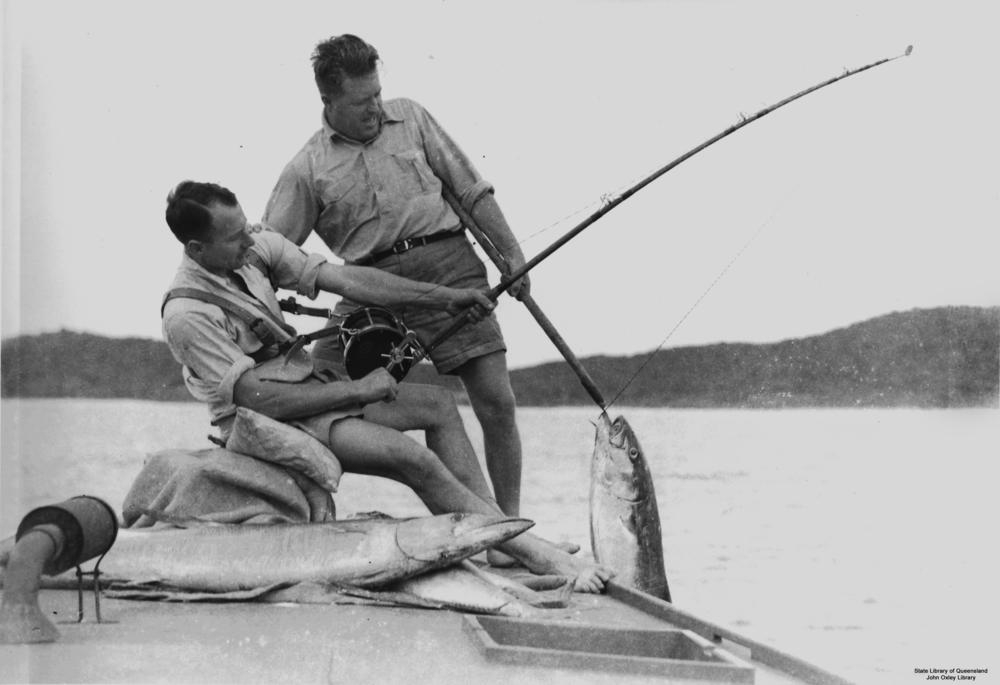
Two boat anglers reeling in a large fish (c.1930-40, State Library of Queensland)

A fishing reel is a hand-cranked reel used in angling to wind and stow fishing line, typically mounted onto a fishing rod, but may also be used on compound bows or crossbows to retrieve tethered arrows when bowfishing.

Modern recreational fishing reels usually have fittings aiding in casting for distance and accuracy, as well as controlling the speed and tension of line retrieval to avoid line snap and hook dislodgement. Fishing reels are traditionally used for bass fishing in angling and competitive casting. They are typically attached near the handle of a fishing rod, though some specialized reels with pressure sensors for immediate retrieval are equipped on downrigger systems which are mounted directly to an ocean-going sport boat's gunwales or transoms and are used for "deep drop" and trolling.

The earliest fishing reel was invented in China at least since the Song dynasty, as shown by detailed illustration of an angler fishing with reel from Chinese paintings and records beginning about 1195 AD, although sporadic textual descriptions of line wheels used for angling had existed since the 3rd century. These early fishing reel designs were likely derived from winches/windlasses and roughly resemble the modern centerpin reels.

Fishing reels first appeared in the Western Hemisphere in England around 1650 AD. An incident is disclosed in an excerpt from author Thomas Barker found in his book, The Art of Angling: wherein are discovered many rare secrets, very necessary to be knowne by all that delight in that recreation:

.... The manner of his Trouling was, with a Hazell Rod of twelve foot long, with a Ring of Wyre in the top of his Rod, for his Line to runne thorow: within two foot of the bottome of the Rod there was a hole made, for to put in a winde, to turne with a barrell, to gather up his Line, and loose at his pleasure; this was his manner of Trouling....

In the 1760s, London tackle shops were advertising multiplying or gear-retrieved reels. The first popular American fishing reel appeared in the United States around 1820. During the second half of the 20th century, Japanese and Scandinavian reel makers such as Shimano, Daiwa and ABU Garcia, previously all precision engineering manufacturers for biking equipments and watchmaking, began rising to dominate the world market.

== History ==
=== Origins in China ===
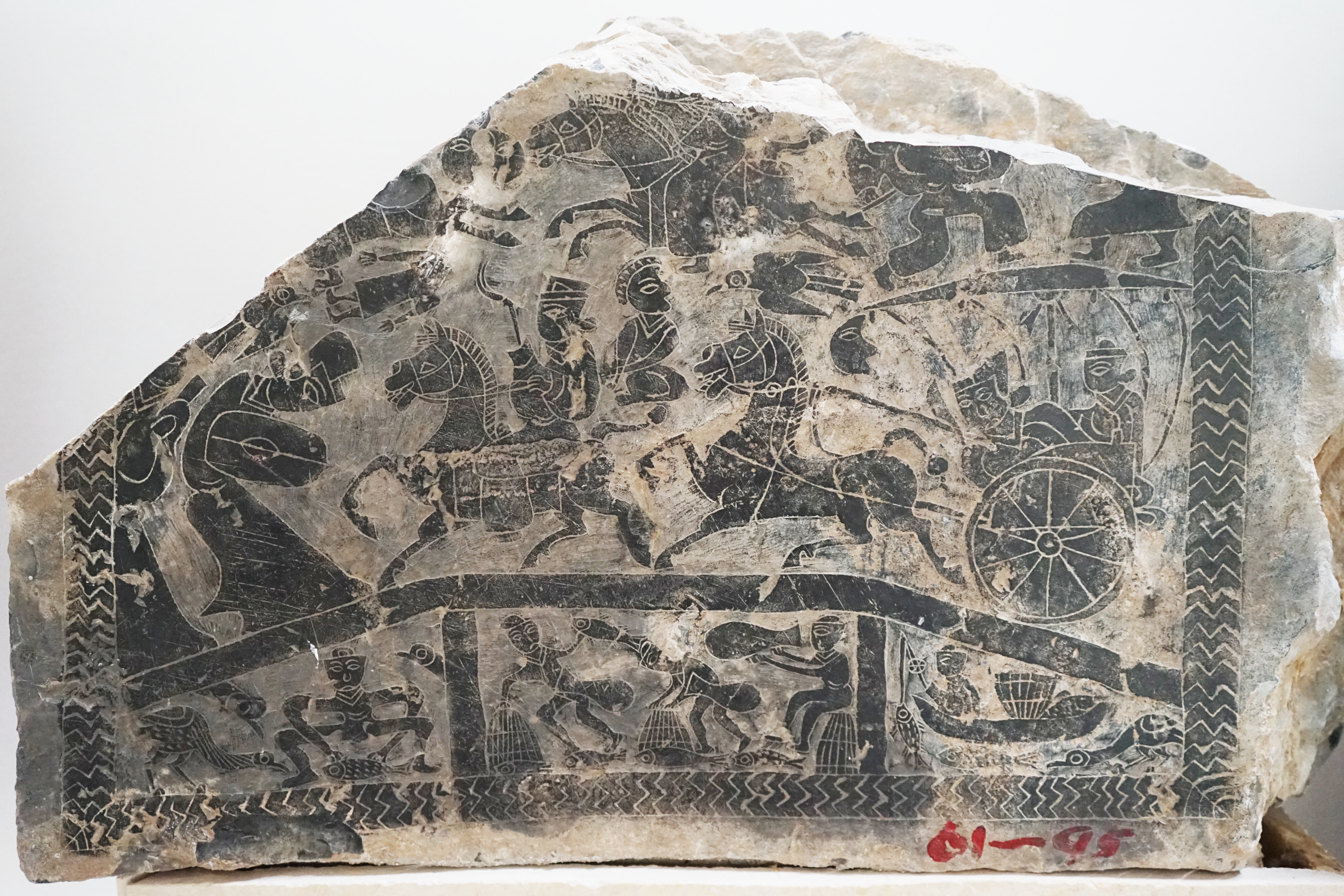
An Eastern Han dynasty (25–220 AD) stone tablet, currently displayed at the Xuzhou Art Museum of Han Stone Gravings, with engravings depicting an angling rod with a wheel-like device (lower right corner)

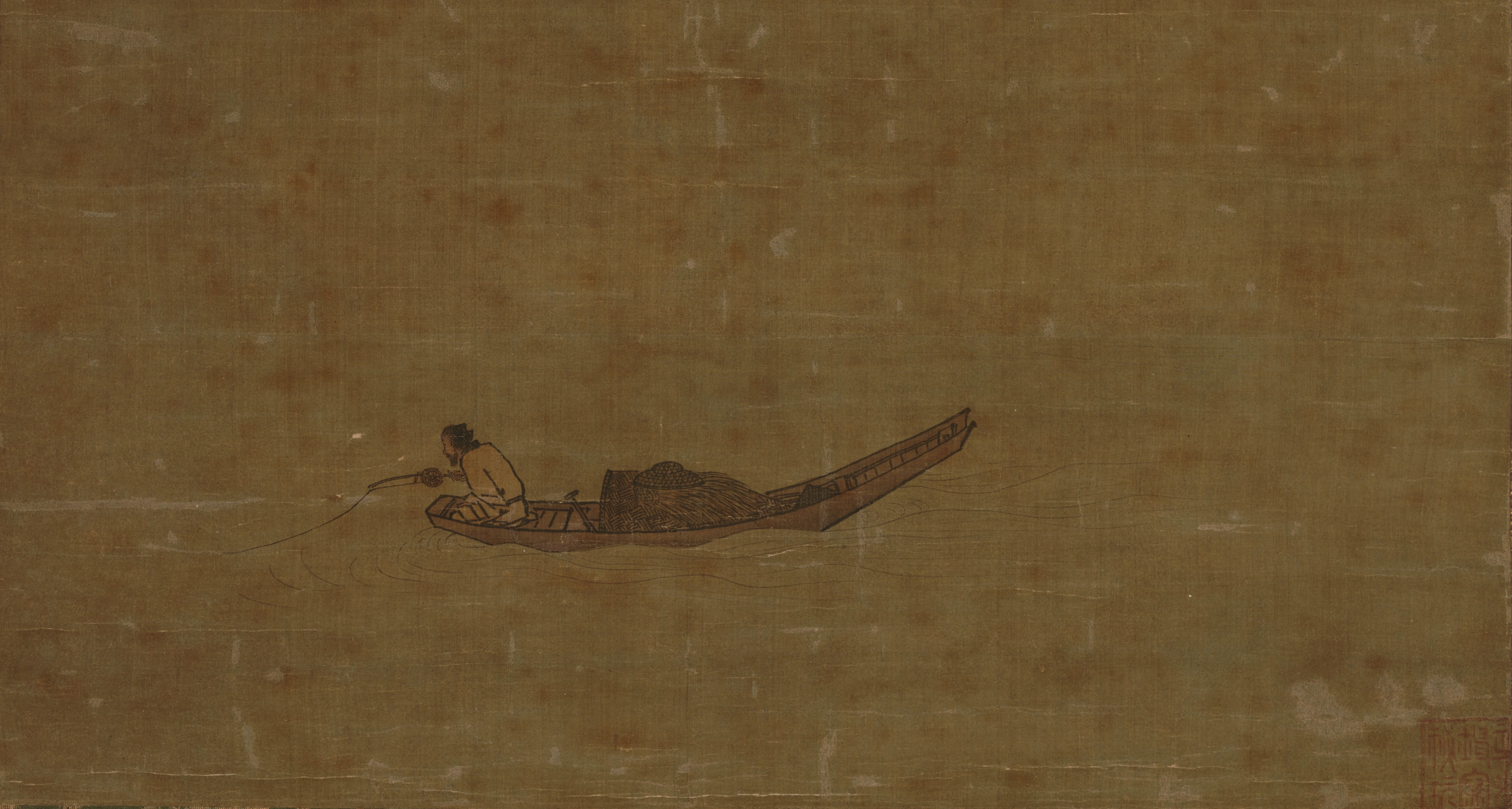
"Angler on a Wintry Lake," painted in 1195 by Ma Yuan

In literary records, the earliest evidence of the fishing reel comes from a 3rd-century AD Chinese work entitled Lives of Famous Immortals, where the term "angling lathe" (釣車) was used. Tang dynasty poet Lu Guimeng (?–881) and his friend Pi Rixiu (834–883), both avid anglers, frequently mentioned "angling lathe" and "angle-fishing wheel" (釣魚輪) in their fishing poems, with Pi even describing a gift reel he received as "an angle-handled wheel [that] is smooth and light" (角柄孤輪細膩輕). Song dynasty poets, such as Huang Tingjian (1045–1105) and Yang Wanli (1127–1206), also made reference to "angling lathe" in lyrics involving lakes and fishing boats. Northern Song scientist Shen Kuo (1031–1095) even once wrote in a travel book that "angling uses wheeled rod, rod uses purple bamboo, the wheel is not to be large, the rod shouldn't be long, but [you] can angle if the line is long" (釣用輪竿，竿用紫竹，輪不欲大，竿不宜長，但絲長則可釣耳).

The earliest known graphical depiction of a fishing reel, according to Joseph Needham, comes from a Southern Song (1127–1279) painting done in 1195 by Ma Yuan (c. 1160–1225) called "Angler on a Wintry Lake". The painting, currently in collection at Tokyo National Museum after the looting of the Old Summer Palace, showing a man sitting on a small sampan boat while casting out his fishing line. Another fishing reel was featured in a painting by Wu Zhen (1280–1354). The book Tianzhu lingqian (Holy Lections from Indian Sources), printed sometime between 1208 and 1224, features two different woodblock print illustrations of fishing reels being used. An Armenian parchment Gospel of the 13th century shows a reel (though not as clearly depicted as the Chinese ones). The Sancai Tuhui, a Chinese encyclopedia published in 1609, features the next known picture of a fishing reel and vividly shows the windlass pulley of the device. These five pictures are the only ones which feature fishing reels before the year 1651.

=== Development in England ===
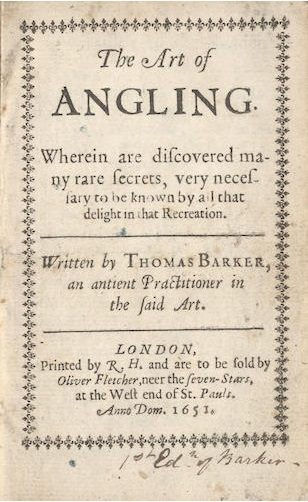
The Art of Angling, first published in 1651, is the first English language book to cite the use of fishing reels.

'Nottingham' and 'Scarborough' reel designs.

The first English book on fishing is "A Treatise of Fishing with an Angle" in 1496 (its spelling respective to the manner of the date is The Treatyse of Fysshynge with an Angle'). However, the book did not mention a reel. A primitive reel was first cited in the book The Art of Angling by Thomas Barker (fl.1591–1651), first published in 1651. Fishing reels first appeared in England around the 1650s, a time of growing interest in fly fishing.

The fishing industry became commercialized in the 18th century, with rods and tackle being sold at the haberdashers store. After the Great Fire of London in 1666, artisans moved to Redditch, a center of fishing-related products from the 1730s. Onesimus Ustonson established his trading shop in 1761, and his establishment remained a market leader for the next century. He received a Royal Warrant from three successive monarchs, starting with King George IV.

Some have credited Onesimus with the invention of the fishing reel – he was undoubtedly the first to advertise its sale. Early multiplying reels were wide and had a small diameter, and their gears, made of brass, often wore down after extensive use. His earliest advertisement in the form of a trading card dates from 1768 and was entitled To all lovers of angling. A full list of the tackles he sold included artificial flies and 'the best sort of multiplying brass winches both stop and plain.' The commercialization of the industry came at a time of expanded interest in fishing as a recreational hobby for members of the aristocracy.

Modern reel design began in England during the latter part of the 18th century, and the predominant model in use was known as the 'Nottingham reel'. The reel was a wide drum that spooled out freely, and was ideal for allowing the bait to drift along way out with the current.

Tackle design began to improve from the 1880s. The introduction of new woods to the manufacture of fly rods made it possible to cast flies into the wind on silk lines, instead of horse hair. These lines allowed for a much greater casting distance. A negative consequence of this, was that it became easy for the much longer line to get into a tangle. This problem spurred the invention of the regulator to evenly spool the line out and prevent tangling.

Albert Illingworth, 1st Baron Illingworth a textiles magnate, patented the modern form of fixed-spool spinning reel in 1905. When casting Illingworth's reel design, the line was drawn off the leading edge of the spool, but was restrained and rewound by a line pickup, a device which orbits around the stationary spool. Because the line did not have to pull against a rotating spool, much lighter lures could be cast than with conventional reels.

=== Development in the United States ===
Geared multiplying reels failed to gain traction in Britain but had more success in the United States, where English models were modified by George W. Snyder (c.1780–1841), a skillful watchmaker and silversmith in Paris, Kentucky, into his own bait-casting reel named the Kentucky Reel, the first American-made design in 1810. Snyder's first reel was made for his own angling use, but afterward, he made reels for members of his club. Without patent or trademark protection, Snyder's Kentucky Reel was quickly copied by many others, including Meek, Milam, Sage, Hardman and Gayle. These artisans were trained in jewelry fabrication and were experienced in cutting gears, constructing small parts, and doing precision work. In time, the Kentucky Reel was mass-produced by the emerging factories located in the Northeast, where they could be produced at a fraction of the cost and time required for hand-built construction. The availability of more affordable fly reels greatly stimulated the sales and popularity of fly fishing equipment. It was soon applied to bait casting reels, resulting in a surge in the popularity of fishing as a pastime among all levels of American society.

The American, Charles F. Orvis, designed and distributed a novel reel and fly design in 1874, described by reel historian Jim Brown as the "benchmark of American reel design," and the first fully modern fly reel. The founding of The Orvis Company helped institutionalize fly fishing by supplying angling equipment via the circulation of his tackle catalogs, distributed to a small but devoted customer list.

== Types ==
Fishing reels can be classified into two design groups: rotary-spool and fixed-spool. Rotary-spool designs are essentially similar to a spinning wheel or windlass, where the spool actively rotates to wind the line around itself. Fixed-spool designs, on the other hand, behave like a spindle and have no rotating motion of the spool itself, instead using a separate spinning mechanism that revolves around the spool to drag and wrap the line around onto the spool.

=== Rotary-spool ===
Rotary-spool reels can be further subdivided into two types: single-action and multiplier. Single-action reels use a direct-drive design where the torque from the crank is transmitted straight to the spool in a synchronous rotating action (hence the name, "single[-ratio] action"), and quite often the crank handle is fixed directly on the spool frame (in which case, the spool frame itself becomes the crank). Multiplier reels, on the other hand, have an internal gear train design that amplifies the number of spool turns for every turn of the crank handle, allowing much faster line retrieval. Typically, the spool on multiplier reels also spins in the opposite direction to that of single-action spools.

With larger-capacity spools (typically in multiplier reels), there is usually a transverse sliding mechanism in front of the spool — known as the line guide — that pushes the line side-to-side in an oscillating motion, allowing the line winding to be more evenly distributed across the spool instead of bunching up in one section.

==== Centrepin reel ====
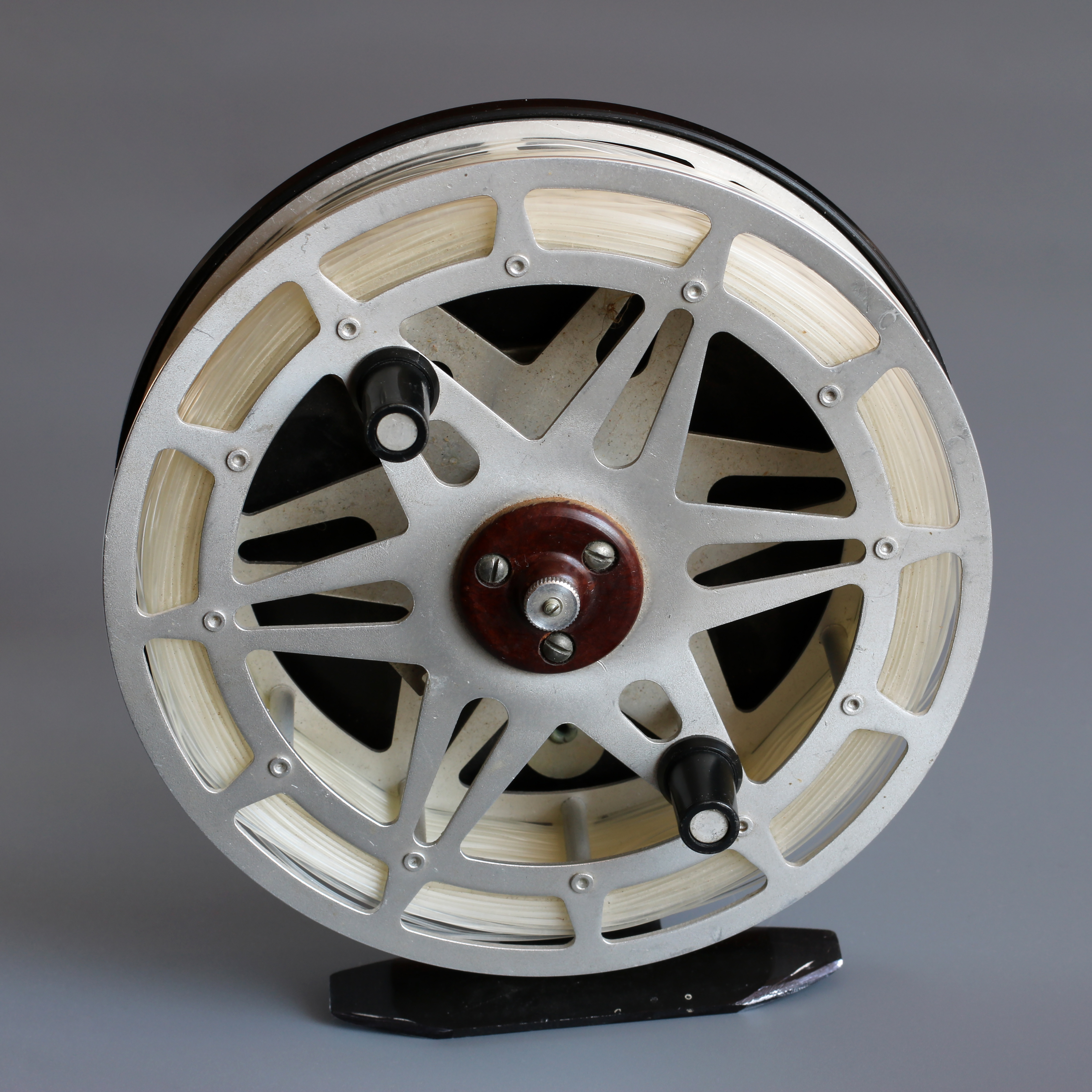
A centrepin reel

The centrepin reel (or centerpin, center pin, or float reel) is a single-action reel which runs freely enough on its axle ("centrepin"). The centrepin reel is the earliest fishing reel design invented by humans, and is historically and currently used for coarse fishing. Instead of a mechanical drag, the angler's thumb is typically used to control the fish. Fishing in the margins for carp or other heavy fish with relatively light tackle is popular with a 'pin', and is often used for 'trotting', a method in which a float on the line suspends a bait at a certain depth to flow with the current along the waterway. During the 1950s and 1960s, many anglers in England began fishing with a centrepin reel. Despite this, the centrepin is today mostly used by coarse anglers, who remain a small proportion of the general fishing population.

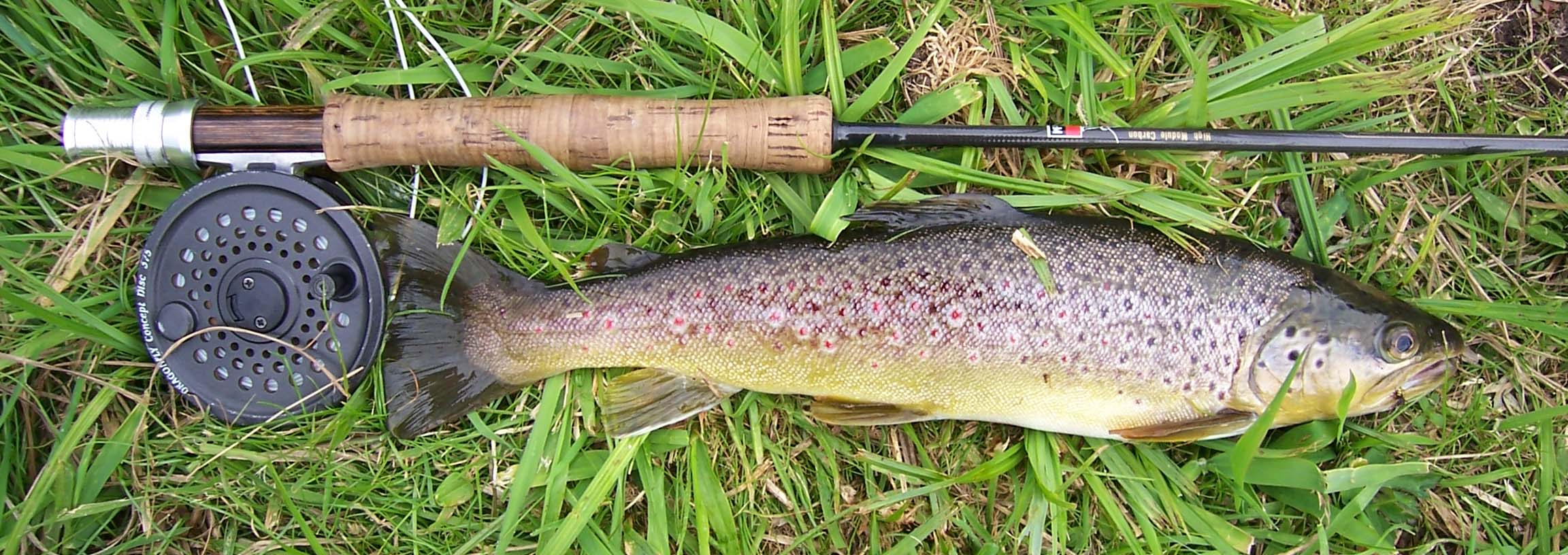
Fly reel and rod with a caught brown trout

A special class of centrepin reel known as the fly reel, used specifically for fly fishing, is normally operated by manually stripping the line off the reel with one hand, while casting the rod with the other hand. The main purpose of a fly reel is to help cast ultralight fly lures and provide smooth uninterrupted tension (drag) when a fish makes a long run, and to counterbalance the weight of the fly rod when casting. When used in fly fishing, the fly reel or fly casting reel has traditionally been rather simple in terms of mechanical construction, and little has changed from the design patented by Charles F. Orvis of Vermont in 1874. Orvis first introduced the idea of using light metals with multiple perforated holes to construct the housing, resulting in a lighter reel that also allowed the spooled fly line to dry more quickly than a conventional, solid-sided design. Early fly reels placed the crank handle on the right side of the reel. Most had no drag mechanism, but were fitted with a click/pawl mechanism intended to keep the reel from overrunning when line was pulled from the spool. To slow a fish, the angler simply applied hand pressure to the rim of the revolving spool (known as "palming the rim"). Later, these click/pawl mechanisms were modified to provide a limited adjustable drag of sorts. Although adequate for smaller fish, these did not possess a wide adjustment range or the power to slow larger fish.

At one time, multiplier fly reels were widely available. These reels had a geared line retrieve of 2:1 or 3:1 that allowed faster retrieval of the fly line. However, their additional weight, complexity and expense did not justify the advantage of faster line retrieval in the eyes of many anglers. As a result, today they are rarely used, and have largely been replaced by large-arbor designs with large diameter spools for faster line retrieval.

Automatic fly reels use a coiled spring mechanism that pulls the line into the reel with the flick of a lever. Automatic reels tend to be heavy for their size, and have limited line capacity. Automatic fly reels peaked in popularity during the 1960s, and since that time they have been outsold many times over by manual fly reels.

Modern fly reels typically have more sophisticated disc-type drag systems made of composite materials that feature increased adjustment range, consistency, and resistance to high temperatures from drag friction. Most of these fly reels also feature large-arbor spools designed to reduce line memory, maintain consistent drag and assist the quick retrieval of slack line in the event a hooked fish makes a sudden run towards the angler. Most modern fly reels are ambidextrous, allowing the angler to place the crank handle of the reel on either the right or the left side as desired.

Saltwater fly reels are designed specifically for use in an ocean environment. Saltwater fly reels are normally large-arbor designs, having a much larger diameter spool than most freshwater fly reels. These large arbor reels provide an improved retrieve ratio and considerably more line and backing capacity, optimising the design for the long runs of powerful ocean game fish. To prevent corrosion, saltwater fly reels often use aerospace aluminium frames and spools, electroplated and/or stainless steel components, with sealed and waterproof bearing and drive mechanisms.

Fly reel operation

Fly reels are normally manual, single-action designs. Rotating a handle on the side of the reel rotates the spool, which retrieves the line, usually at a 1:1 ratio (i.e., one complete revolution of the handle equals one revolution of the spool). Fly reels are among the simplest reels and have far fewer parts than a spinning reel. The larger the fish, the more important the reel becomes. On the outside of the reel there are two main controls: the spool release and the drag adjustment.

Fly reel drag systems

Fly-reel drag systems have two purposes. One, they prevent spool overrun when stripping line from the reel while casting, and two, they tire out running fish by exerting pressure on the line that runs in the opposite direction. There are four main drag systems that are used with the fly reel: ratchet-and-pawl, caliper drags, disc drags, and centre-line drags. The ratchet-and-pawl drag clicks automatically while the spool is spinning. The caliper drag causes the calipers to brush up against the reel spool. A disc drag applies pressure on the plates, which then applies pressure on the spool. Centre-line drags apply pressure to the spool close to the axis of rotation.

==== Sidecast reel ====
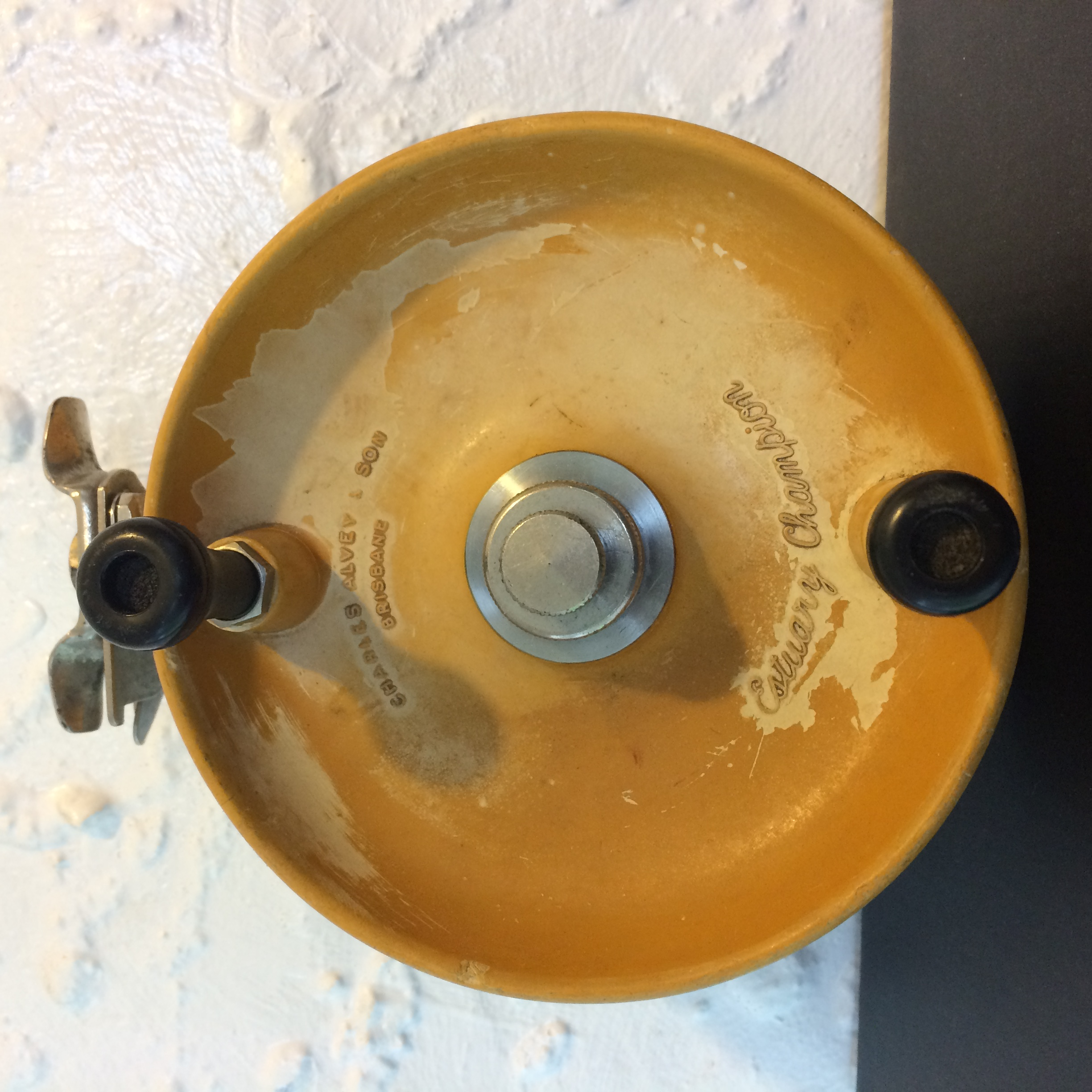
Australian made "Alvey" sidecast reel

The sidecast reel takes elements of the design of the centrepin reel, but adds a bracket that allows the reel to be rotated 90° for casting and then returned to the original position to retrieve line. In the casting position, the spool face is perpendicular to the rod and the axle is parallel, and the line is free to slide off the side of the spool like on a spinning reel. The advantage of such a design is that the reel is direct-driven, and during casting the line release is as smooth as that of a spinning reel, but it does require an extra hand movement to start reeling.

Sidecast reels are popular with anglers in Australia for all forms of freshwater and saltwater fishing. Most common is their use for surf fishing (beachcasting), or off the rocks, often with a larger diameter spool (6–7 in or 150–180 mm) and paired with a 12–16 ft or 3.7–4.9 m surfcasting rod. The most famous brand of sidecast reels is Alvey Reels, a Brisbane-based fishing tackle manufacturer established in 1920.

==== Conventional reel ====
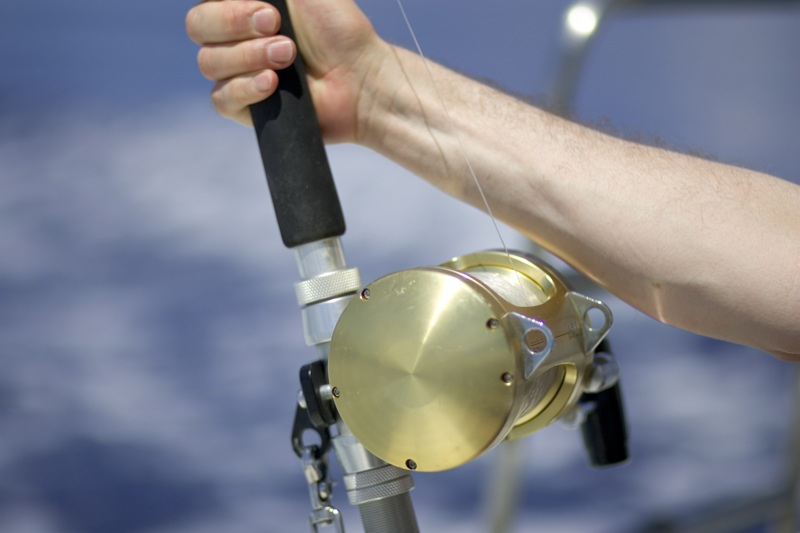
A trolling reel

The conventional reel, also known as the trolling reel (due to its popularity in recreational boat trolling) or "drum reel" (due to its often drum-like cylindrical shape), is the most classical design of multiplier reels. It can be mounted (more often) above or below the rod handle, with the spool axis being perpendicular to the rod. In such a setup the line does not go over the end of the spool like it does with a spinning reel. Most modern conventional reels have a line guide that slides left and right when cranking to ensure a more even wrapping of the line onto the spool.

There are two types of trolling reels depending on the drag system design, namely the star drag reels and lever drag reels. Star drag reels are like most baitcasters, because they have a star-shaped drag control knob used to apply drag as well as a lever to put them into free spool. The lever drag reel uses a drag lever to perform both functions, as it can apply drag and put the reel into free spool. With either type, care must be taken to prevent backlash while they are in free spool. Keeping a thumb on the spool is one way to prevent a free spool backlash. Some smaller sizes of conventional reels can be cast, but large conventional reels are not meant for casting; the larger they are the more difficult they become to cast. Conventional reels are for really big fish and are usually used offshore. As a tool for deep-sea fishing, they are mostly designed for trolling but can also be used for drift fishing, butterfly jigging and "deep drop" fishing. They are usually mounted on short, often very stiff rods called "boat" rods.

==== Baitcasting reel ====
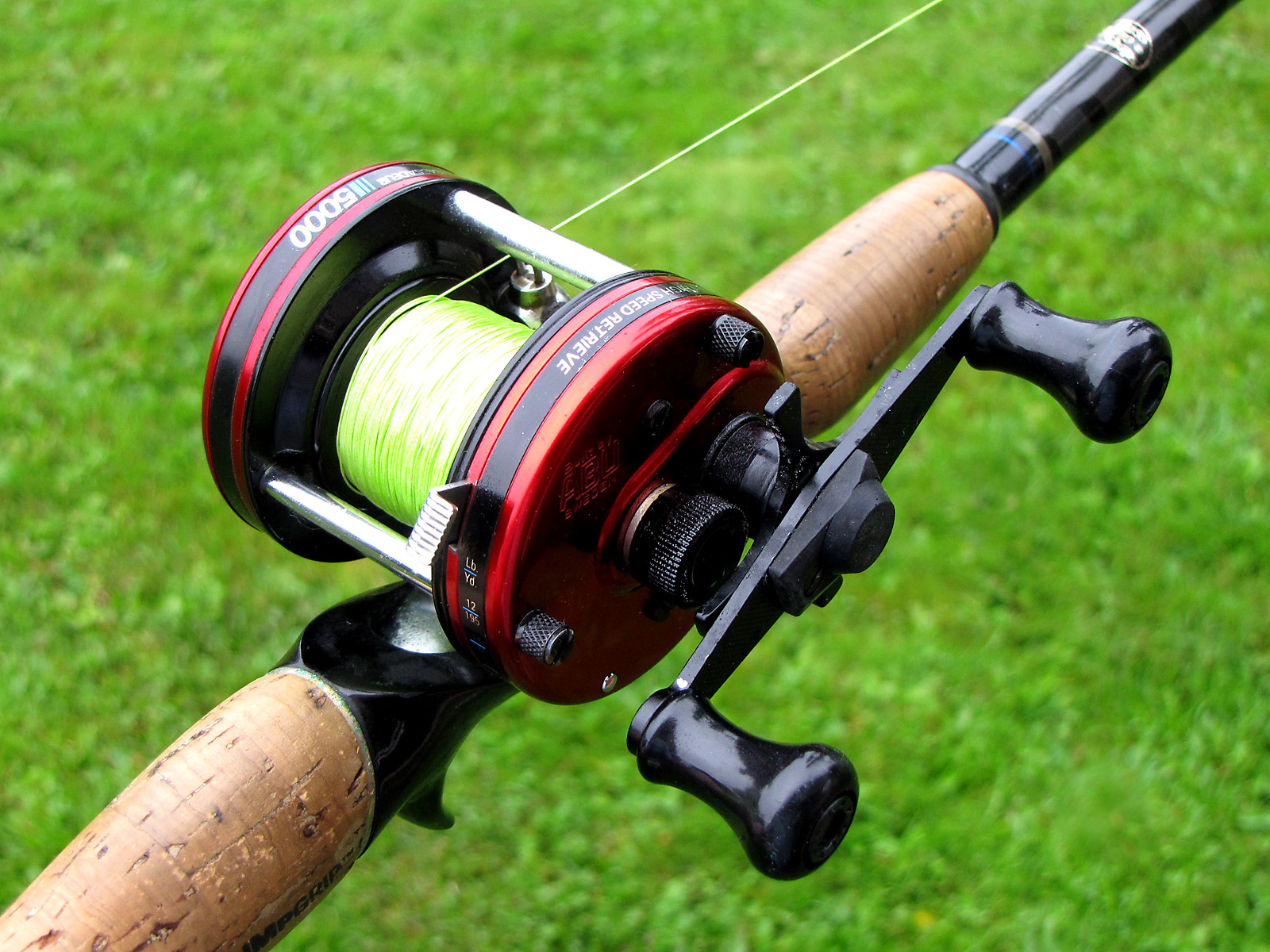
An older-design baitcasting reel – the ABU Garcia Ambassadeur

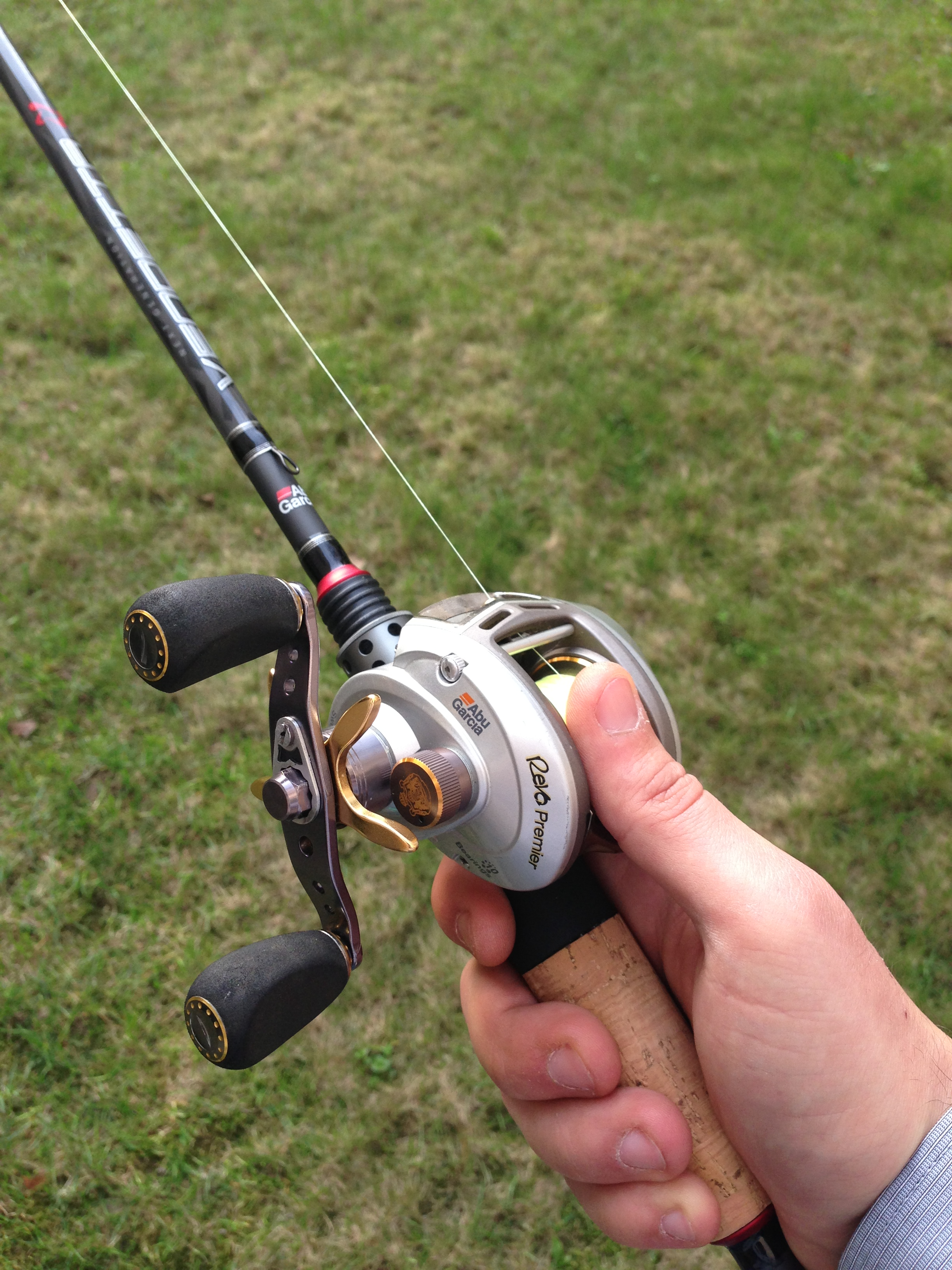
A more modern baitcasting reel – the ABU Garcia Revo

The baitcasting reel or baitcaster is a multiplying reel modified from the conventional reel, but with a lighter spool and a higher, more forwardly positioned line guide to facilitate farther and smoother casting, hence the name. The baitcasting reel is always mounted above the rod handle (of what is known as a "casting rod"), hence its other name given to it in New Zealand and Australia, the overhead reel. The line is stored on a bearing-supported, more freely revolving spool that is geared so that a single revolution of the crank handle results in multiple (usually 4× or more) revolutions of the spool. The baitcasting reel design will operate well with a wide variety of fishing lines ranging from braided multifilament, heat-fused "Superlines", copolymer, fluorocarbon and nylon monofilaments (see Fishing line). Most baitcasting reels can also easily be palmed or thumbed to increase the drag, set the hook, or to accurately halt the lure at a given point in the cast.

The baitcasting reel dates from at least the mid-17th century, but came into wide use by amateur anglers during the 1870s. Early baitcasting reels were often constructed with brass or iron gears, with casings and spools made of brass, German silver or hard rubber. Featuring multiplying gears ranging from 2:1 to 4:1, these early reels had no drag mechanism, and anglers used their thumb on the spool to provide resistance to runs by a fish. As early as the 1870s, some models used bearings to mount the spool; as the free-spinning spool tended to cause backlash with strong pulls on the line, manufacturers soon incorporated a clicking pawl mechanism. This "clicker" mechanism was never intended as a drag, but used solely to keep the spool from overrunning, much like a fly reel. Baitcasting reel users soon discovered that the clicking noise of the pawls provided valuable audible warning that a fish had taken the live bait, allowing the rod and reel to be left in a rod holder while awaiting a strike by a fish.

Most fishing reels are mounted on the bottom side of the rod, since this position is in stable equilibrium with gravity (as the center of mass of the whole reel-rod system is below the rod handle) and doesn't require additional wrist and grip exertion to prevent the rod from twisting, thus enabling the angler to cast and retrieve without needing to worry about the reel rotating off around the rod. The unusual atop-the-rod mounting position of baitcasting reels is an accident of history, as they were originally designed to be cast when positioned atop the rod, then rotate upside-down to operate the crank handle with the left hand while retrieving the line. However in practice, most baitcaster anglers preferred to keep the reel atop the rod the whole time by simply casting with the right hand, then transferring the rod to the left hand and reverse-winding the crank handle counterclockwise with the right hand during line retrieval. Because of this preference, mounting the crank handle on the right side of a bait casting reel (with a clockwise crank rotation) has become customary, though models with left-hand counterclockwise cranking have also gained in popularity in recent years thanks to user familiarity with the spinning reel.

Traditionally, baitcasting reel frames are constructed using bronze, brass or stainless steel, while many of today's baitcasting reels are made with aluminium alloy, synthetic composites such as fiberglass-reinforced plastic or carbon fiber, or a combination of the above to reduce weight; newer but more expensive materials such as titanium and magnesium alloys can also be found occasionally. They are typically paired with a specialized fishing rod called a casting rod, which has a trigger-shaped finger hook under the handle area that allows the user to assume a wider and more forward grip with the thumb and index finger semi-enveloping the reel while still maintaining a secured grasp on the handle by hooking the "trigger" with the middle/ring finger. This grip is also colloquially known as "palming" the reel, and is favored by some anglers who prefer single-handed casting due to straighter rod alignment with the forearm (thus better ergonomics due to less ulnar deviation), an intuitive feel of "pointing" the rod with more precise and comfortable control of the rod movements (particularly when finesse fishing), and a firmer hold on the reel and line tension when fighting the fish. Modern baitcasters also often include a level-wind mechanism to prevent the line from being trapped under itself on the spool during rewind and interfering with subsequent casts. Many are also fitted with anti-reverse handles and drags designed to slow runs by large and powerful game fish. Because the baitcasting reel uses the weight and momentum of the lure to pull the line from the rotating spool, it normally requires lures weighing 1/4 oz. or more to cast a significant distance. Recent developments have seen baitcasting reels with gear ratios as high as 7.1/1. Higher gear ratios allow much faster retrieval of line, but sacrifice some amount of strength in exchange, since the additional gear teeth required reduces torque as well as the strength of the gear train. This could be a factor when fighting a large and powerful fish.

Two variations of the revolving-spool baitcasting reel are the conventional surf fishing reel and the big game reel. These are very large and robust fishing reels, designed and built for heavy saltwater species such as tuna, marlins, groupers and sharks. Surf fishing reels are normally mounted to long, two-handed rods known as surf rods; these reels frequently omit level-wind and braking mechanisms to achieve extremely long casting distances. Big game reels are not designed for casting, but are instead used for trolling or jigging off a pier or a boat using stout, heavy-duty rods; they are capable of enduring heavy loads using sophisticated star or lever drags, and are ideal for tiring out large, heavy saltwater gamefish.

Baitcasting reel operation

To cast a baitcasting rod and reel, the reel is turned on its side, the "free spool" feature engaged, and the thumb placed on the spool to hold the lure in position. The cast is performed by snapping the rod backward to the 2 o'clock position, then casting it forward in a smooth motion, allowing the lure to pull the line from the reel. The thumb is used to contact the line, moderating the revolutions of the spool and braking the lure when it reaches the desired aiming point. Though modern centrifugal and/or magnetic braking systems help to control backlash, using a bait casting reel still requires practice and a certain amount of finesse on the part of the fisherman for best results.

Advantages of baitcasting reels

While spincasting and spinning reels are easier to operate because fishing line leaves the spool freely during a cast, baitcasting reels have the potential to overrun: a casting issue in which the reel's spool does not spin at a rate equal to the speed of fishing line leaving the reel. Professional fishermen, however, prefer baitcasters because baitcasting reels allow anglers more control over their casts. Since a baitcaster's spool spins along with the fishing line leaving the reel, a simple flick of the thumb can stop a cast early or slow a lure while it is still in the air. This grants anglers such as bass fishermen more accuracy in their casts. Furthermore, a baitcaster's design allows a fisherman to make casts at a faster rate, even with heavier baits.

Disadvantages of baitcasting reels

- Effective use of baitcasting reels requires prior experience and a developed skill set, thus it is unsuitable for beginners.
- There are higher risks of getting backlashes during the cast without proper techniques.
- One must know about spool tension adjustment for different spool sizes.
- Unsuitable for light lures.
- More costly than spinning reels.

=== Fixed-spool ===
Fixed spool reels can have either an "open" design, where the spool is exposed to the outside; or an "enclosed" design, where the spool is concealed under an enclosure with a front hole that allows passage of the line. There is typically an internal axle that imparts a slight reciprocating motion to the spool, which allows the line to be wrapped in a more evenly distributed fashion.

==== Spinning reel ====
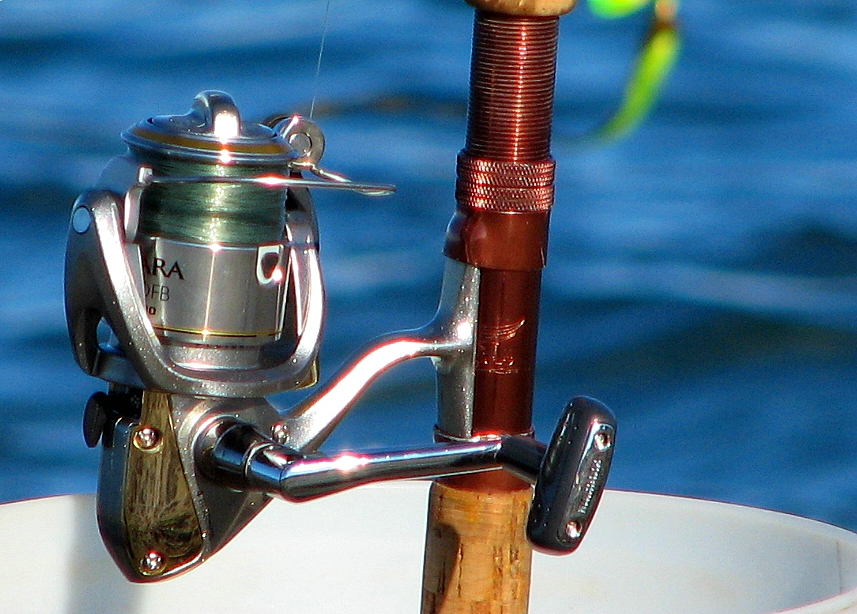
A spinning reel

Spinning reels, also called fixed spool reels, 'coffee grinders' or 'egg beaters', are open-design fixed-spool reels that were in use in North America as early as the 1870s. They were originally developed to allow the use of artificial flies, or other lures for trout or salmon, that were too light in weight to be easily cast by conventional or baitcasting reels. Spinning reels are normally mounted below the rod; this positioning conforms to gravity, requiring no wrist strength to maintain the reel in position. For right-handed persons, the spinning rod is held and cast by the strong right hand, leaving the left hand free to operate the crank handle mounted on the left side of the reel. Invention of the spinning reel solved the problem of backlash, since the reel had no rotating spool capable of overrunning and tangling the line.

The name of Holden Illingworth, a textiles magnate, was first associated with the modern form of fixed-spool spinning reel. When casting the Illingworth reel, line was drawn off the leading edge of the spool, but was restrained and rewound by a line pickup, a device which orbits around the stationary spool. Because the line did not have to pull against a rotating spool, much lighter lures could be cast than with conventional reels.

In 1948, the Mitchell Reel Company of Cluses, France introduced the Mitchell 300, a spinning reel with a design that oriented the face of the fixed spool forward in a permanently fixed position below the fishing rod. The Mitchell reel was soon offered in a range of sizes for all fresh and saltwater fishing. A manual line pickup was used to retrieve the cast line, which eventually developed into a wire bail design that automatically recaptured the line upon cranking the retrieve handle. An anti-reverse lever prevented the crank handle from rotating while a fish was pulling line from the spool, and this pull can be altered with adjustable drag systems which allow the spool to rotate, but not the handle. With the use of light lines testing from two to six pounds, modern postwar spinning reels were capable of casting lures as light as 1/8 ounce (3.5 g), and sometimes lighter.

With all fixed-spool reels, the line is released in coils or loops from the leading edge of the non-rotating spool. To shorten or stop the outward cast of a lure or bait, the angler uses a finger or thumb placed in contact with the line and/or the leading edge of the spool to retard or stop the flight of the lure. Because of the design's tendency to twist and untwist the line as it is cast and retrieved, most spinning reels operate best with fairly limp and flexible fishing lines.

Though spinning reels do not suffer from backlash, line can occasionally be trapped underneath itself on the spool or even detach from the reel in loose loops of line. Some of these issues can be traced to overfilling the spool with line, while others are due to the way in which the line is wound onto the spool by the rotating bail or pickup. Various oscillating spool mechanisms have been introduced over the years in an effort to solve this problem. Spinning reels also tend to have more issues with twisting of the fishing line. Line twist in spinning reels can occur from the spin of an attached lure, the action of the wire bail against the line when engaged by the crank handle, or even retrieval of line that is under load (spinning reel users normally pump the rod up and down, then retrieve the slack line to avoid line twist and stress on internal components). To minimize line twist, many anglers who use a spinning reel manually reposition the bail after each cast with the pickup nearest the rod to minimize line twist.

Fixed spool reel operation

Fixed spool reels are cast by grasping the line with the forefinger against the rod handle, opening the bale arm and then using a backward swing of the rod followed by a forward cast while releasing the line with the forefinger. The point of release should be trialled to find optimum angle for your casting. The forefinger is then placed in contact with the departing line and the leading edge of the spool to slow or stop the outward cast. On the retrieve, one hand operates the crank handle, while the large rotating wire cage or bail (either manually or trigger-operated) serves as the line pickup, restoring the line to its original position on the spool.

Fixed spool advantages

Spinning reels were originally developed to better cast light-weight lures and baits. Today, spinning reels continue to be an excellent alternative to baitcasters, reels which have difficulty casting lighter lures. Furthermore, because spinning reels do not suffer from backlash, spinning reels are easier and more convenient to use for some fishermen.

==== Spincast reel ====
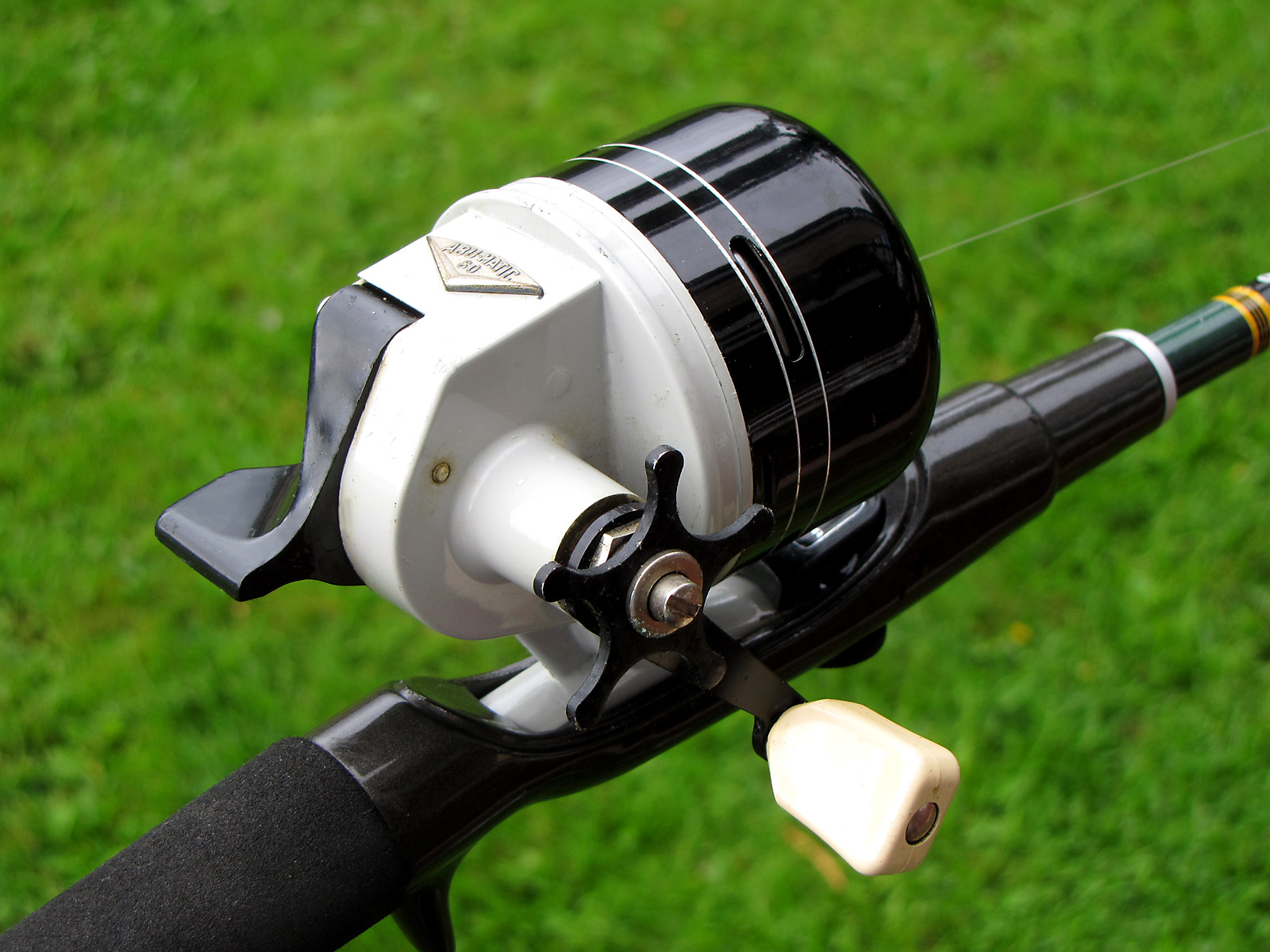
A spincast reel

Spincast reels are fixed-spool reels with the spool and line pickup mechanisms enclosed within a cylindrical or cylindroconoidal cover, which has a hole at the front to transmit the line. The first commercial spincast reels were introduced by the Denison-Johnson Reel Company and the Zero Hour Bomb Company (ZEBCO) in 1949. Spincast reels avoid the problem of backlash found in baitcast designs, while reducing line twist and snare complaints sometimes encountered with traditional spinning reel designs. Just as with the spinning reel, the line is thrown from a fixed spool and can therefore be used with relatively light lures and baits. However, the spincast reel eliminates the large wire bail and line roller of the spinning reel in favor of one or two simple pickup pins and a metal cup to wind the line on the spool. Traditionally mounted above the rod, the spincast reel is also fitted with an external nose cone that encloses and protects the fixed spool. Spincast reels may also be described as closed face reels.

With a fixed spool, spincast reels can cast lighter lures than bait cast reels, although friction of the nose cone guide and spool cup against the uncoiling line reduces casting distance compared to spinning reels. Spincast reel design requires the use of narrow spools with less line capacity than either baitcasting or spinning reels of equivalent size, and cannot be made significantly larger in diameter without making the reel too tall and unwieldy. These limitations severely restrict the use of spin cast reels in situations such as fishing at depth, when casting long distances, or where fish can be expected to make long runs. Like other types of reels, spin cast reels are frequently fitted with both anti-reverse mechanisms and friction drags, and some also have level-wind (oscillating spool) mechanisms. Most spin cast reels operate best with limp monofilament lines, though at least one spin cast reel manufacturer installs a thermally fused "superline" into one of its models as standard equipment. During the 1950s and into the mid-1960s, they were widely used and very popular, though the spinning reel has since eclipsed them in popularity in North America. They remain a favorite fishing tool for catfish fishing and also for young beginners in general.

Spincast reel Operation

Pressing a button on the rear of the reel disengages the line pickup, and the button is then released during the forward cast to allow the line to fly off the spool. The button is pressed again to stop the lure at the position desired. Upon cranking the handle, the pickup pin immediately re-engages the line and spools it onto the reel.

==== Underspin reel ====
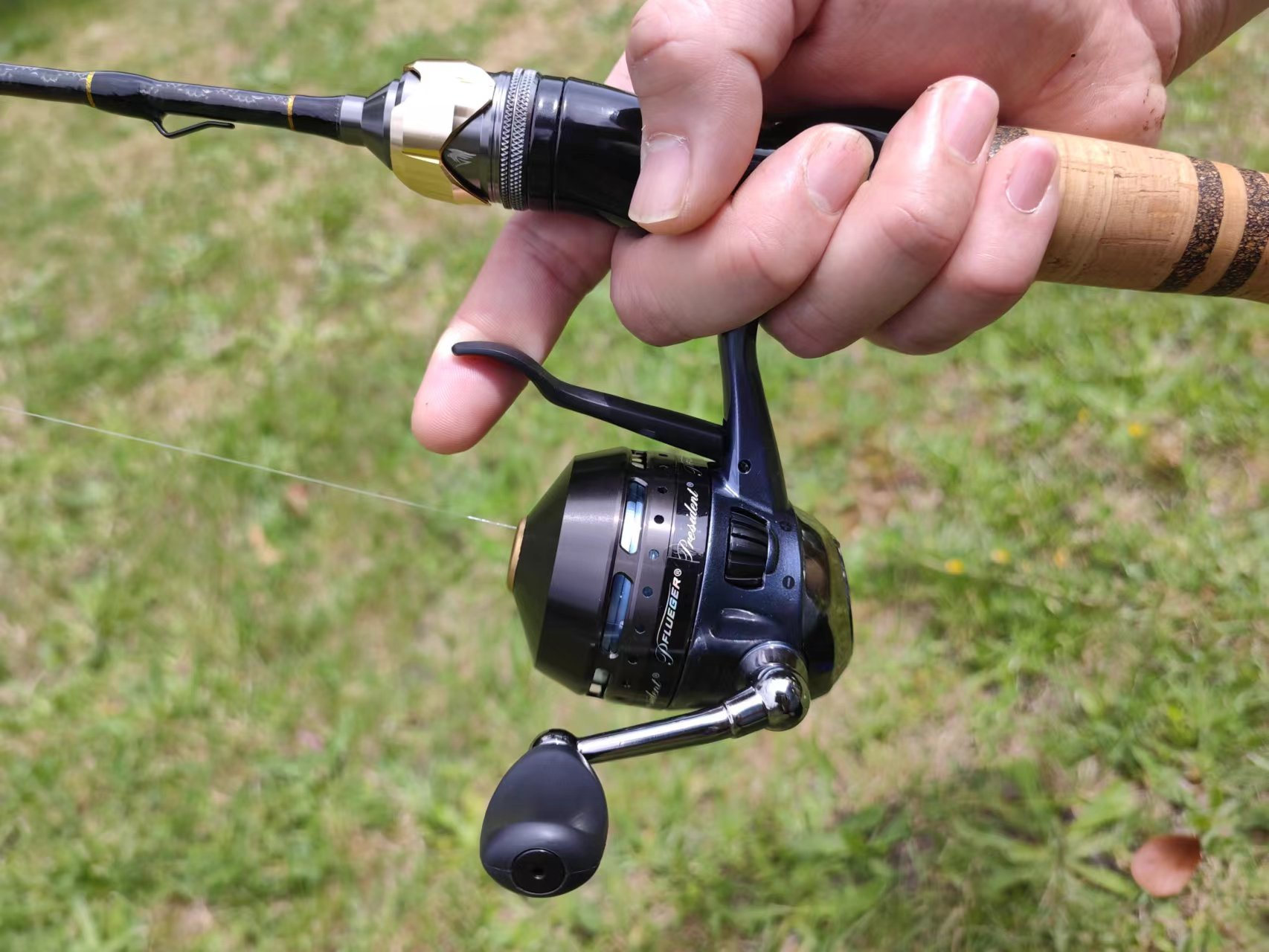
Underspin (triggerspin) reel

Underspin reels or triggerspin reels are variants of spincast reels that is designed for mounting below a standard spinning rod. The reel foot is now located on top of the reel (like a spinning reel), and the line release button is replaced by a front lever. With the reel's weight suspended beneath the rod, underspin reels are generally more comfortable to cast and hold for long periods, and the ability to use all standard spinning rods greatly increases its versatility compared to traditional spin cast reels.

Underspin Reel Operation

When the line release lever/trigger is lifted up by the forefinger (usually the index finger of the rod-holding hand), the line catch inside the reel disengages and retracts, and the line is free to slide off the fixed spool. In some modern designs (e.g. the Pflueger "President" reel), keeping the lever fully pulled up will however protrude the whole spool forward and pinch the line against the enclosure interior, thus halting the line release. During line retrieval, the mechanism inside the reel will engage the line catch again, which protrudes out to "grab" the line and wrap it around the spool. When necessary, the lever can be activated once again to stop the lure at a given point in the retrieval.

== Mechanisms ==
=== Reel mechanisms ===
Direct-drive reel

Direct-drive reels have the spool and handle directly coupled. When the angler is reeling in a fish, there's user operation, but when the line is going out, and the fish is taking the bait and the reel handles are visible moving likewise to the line unwinding. With a fast-running fish, this may have consequences for the angler's knuckles. Traditional fly reels are direct-drive.

Anti-reverse reel

In anti-reverse reels, a mechanism allows line to pay out while the handle remains stationary. Depending on the drag setting, line may also pay out, as with a running fish, while the angler reels in. Baitcasting reels and many modern saltwater fly reels are examples of this design. The mechanism works either with a 'dog' or 'pawl' design that engages into a cog wheel attached to the handle shaft. The latest design is Instant Anti-Reverse, or IAR. This system incorporates a one-way clutch bearing or centrifugal force fly wheel on the handle shaft to restrict handle movement to forward motion only.

=== Drag mechanisms ===
Drag systems are a mechanical means of applying variable pressure to the line spool or drive mechanism to act as a friction brake against outgoing spool rotation. Under normal load, the friction holds the spool and the gears in synchrony, allowing the user to reel in the line; if the tension along the fishing line exceeds the drag setting, the braking friction is overcome and the spool will reverse-rotate with resistance until the line tension drops back below the drag setting. Some designs also have an internal spring clicker that generates warning noises to remind the user whenever the line tension exceeds the drag setting. Such mechanism serves to cap off the maximum line tension and prevents it from overloading and breaking when landing a strong or vigorously fighting fish. In combination with rod flexing and adequate angling techniques, the angler can catch fish much larger than the on-paper breaking strength of the line by "walking" and gradually tiring out the fish.

The mechanics of drag systems usually consist of a number of frictional discs (drag washers) arranged in a coaxial stack on the spool shaft, or in some cases, on the drive shaft. There is generally a screw or lever mechanism that presses perpendicularly against the washers, which creates friction especially when each washer slides against adjacent ones – the higher the pressure, the greater the resistance. Drag washers are commonly made of materials such as felt, Teflon, carbon fiber or other reinforced plastics, and usually have metallic (usually steel) washers stacked intermittently to help distribute shear stress more evenly. Since large fish can generate a lot of pulling power, reels with higher available drag forces for higher-test lines will generate greater heat, and therefore use stronger and more heat-resistant materials, often with coated with specialty oil or grease to prevent burning and unwanted locking between adjacent washers. A good drag system one that is durable and generates precise, consistent and smooth (with no jerkiness) resistance.

==== Spinning reels ====
Spinning reels have two types of drag design: front or rear. All spinning reels come with front drag, but rear drag, also called "bait runner" or "baitfeeder", is an additional feature.

Front drags are basically a screw knob mounted to the front end of the spool, which exerts direct graduated axial pressure on the drag washers on the main pinion. To adjust these, the user needs to reach around the front to turn and tighten/loosen the spool. Front drags are mechanically simpler and usually more consistent in performance and capable of higher drag forces.

Rear drags, on the other hand, have an adjustment screw on the back of the reel along with a separate lever to activate its use. It automatically flips off whenever the fisherman touches the spool-crank and the front drag then steps in at that moment and incorporates its setting into the fight. Manufacturers seldom issue over ten pounds of drag from the rear but are said to be more complicated mechanically and usually not as precise or smooth as front drags since the drag itself is often part of the drive shaft and not the spool. They are for the first moments of the encounter when the fish has the bait in its mouth and is running with it without the hook set yet. The rear drag stops when the fisherman turns his spool-crank to engage the culprit on the run, and sets the hook.

==== Casting reels ====
Conventional overhead, trolling or baitcasting type reels usually use one of two types of drags: star or lever. The most common and simplest mechanically is the so-called 'star drag' because the adjustor wheel looks like a star with rounded points. Star drags work by screw action to increase or decrease the pressure on the washer stack which is usually located on the main driving gear. Reels with star drags generally have a separate lever which allows the reel to go into "freespool" by disengaging the spool from the drive train completely and allowing it to spin freely with little resistance. The freespool position is used for casting, letting line out and/or allowing live bait to move freely.

Lever drags work through cam action to increase or decrease pressure on the drag washers located on the spool itself. Most lever drags offer preset drag positions for strike (reduced drag to avoid tearing the hook out of the fish), full (used once the hook is set) and freespool (see above). Lever drags are simpler and faster to adjust during the fight. And, since they use the spool for the washer stack rather than the drive gear, the washers can be larger, offering more resistance and smoother action. The disadvantage is that in freespool, there can be residual and unwanted resistance since the drag mechanism may not be completely out of the picture without resorting to more complex mechanics.

==== Setting the drag ====
Proper drag setting depends on fishing conditions, line test (break strength) and the size and type of fish being targeted. Often it is a matter of "feel" and knowing the setup to get the drag right.

With spinning reels, closed-face reels and conventional reels with star drags, a good starting point is to set the drag to about one-third to one-half the breaking strength of the line. For example, if the line is rated at 20-pound-force (89 N) test, a drag setting that requires 7–10 pounds-force (31–44 N) of force on the line to move the spool would be appropriate. This is only a rule of thumb. For lever drag reels with a strike position, most anglers start by setting the drag at the strike position to one-third the break strength of the line. This usually allows the full position to still be safely under the line rating while providing flexibility during the fight. Depending on the conditions, some anglers may leave their reels in freespool then setting the anti-reverse or engaging the drag on hookup.

=== Braking mechanisms ===
When casting, the terminal tackles flying through the air will decelerate due to air resistance, causing the line release out of the reel (which is mainly driven by the forward momentum of the terminal tackles) to slow down exponentially. This is particularly apparent when casting lightweight and/or poorly aerodynamic baits/lures, or when casting against the wind. If the angler is using a multiplier reel, its rotary spool often still has sufficient rotational momentum to keep itself spinning with a far more gradual deceleration. This deceleration mismatch between the line release and the spool rotation causes the lagging line to inertially "float" off the spool in loose loops before it can exit the reel. Some of these floating loops eventually get large enough to be pulled into the narrow spaces between the spool and the reel chassis – a phenomenon known as a spool overrun or a backlash, which often snares the loops into a very messy tangle (colloquially called a "bird's nest" or "birdie") that is notoriously difficult to untangle. Such backlashing is unique to multiplier reels, particularly baitcasters, and is not present with fixed-spool reels such as a spinning reel.

To deal with backlashing, most modern baitcasting reels have a so-called "cast control" that serves to reduce the incidence of spool overrun at the cost of sacrificing casting distances. Each time a different lure weight is attached, the cast control must be adjusted to calibrate for the difference in lure momentum and deceleration. The users are also required to learn the skill of "feathering the spool" with their thumb to apply direct tactile friction on the spool surface to slow down or even stop it from spinning.

==== Spool tension ====
Spool tension is an adjustable screw knob that is coaxial to the reel spool. When tightened, the knob exerts axial pressure on the spool gear and generates a consistent frictional resistance when the spool is free-spinning.

==== Centrifugal braking ====
Centrifugal braking uses a series of spring-loaded "blocks" on the spool, which can move radially outwards under centrifugal force when the spool is spinning rapidly. These blocks each have a rubber piece that can rub against the reel chassis, creating additional friction that slows down the spool until the blocks retract back under spring tension. Some reels, such as the Shimano SVS Infinity, have designs that allow each centrifugal blocks to be locked and temporarily disabled.

==== Magnetic braking ====
Magnetic braking incorporates the principles of Lenz's law to create a contactless resistance to the spool spinning. The reel chassis (usually on the side opposite to the crank handle) has a circularly arranged array of magnets creating a magnetic field. When the spool rotates, its metallic frame cuts through the field lines and experiences an electromagnetic resistance, which changes with the spool speed but persists as long as the spool is still moving.

==== Electronic braking ====
Electronic braking uses an electronic circuit to monitor the speed of spool rotation and apply pre-calculated resistance via an internal actuator. The most famous is the Shimano Curado DC ("Digital Control") series, first introduced in 2003 and having remained the only electronically braked fishing reel in the world for two decades until early 2023, when two similar products, the Daiwa IMZ Limitbreaker and the KastKing iReel IFC ("Intelligent Frequency Control"), were announced respectively.

=== Line guide mechanisms ===
Line guides are unique to multiplier reels, as more evenly wound lines on the spool would allow the reel to function more smoothly and prevent unwanted "overspill" of line at either end of the spool. The vast majority of line guides are a simple ring or short cylinder with a 2–3 mm (0.08–0.12 in) internal diameter, which slides horizontally along a spiral-groove shaft. The side-to-side motion of the line guide continuously pushes and realigns the line onto different section of the spool, thus allowing a more even distribution of winding.

While line guides are crucial to reel operation during retrieval, during casting it becomes more of a hindrance because the line will have to go through its narrow internal channel to leave the reel. This creates additional drag from friction (especially when the line kinks against the back rim of the guide) or when loose line loops whips against the line guide. This exacerbates backlashing as the narrow line guide channel often limits how fast the line can leave the reel, and is particularly a problem when the line guide stops near the side of the reel when the reel gears are disengaged during casting. There are design modifications on line guides aimed to minimize resistance against line release, most of which involve having a conical or funnel-shaped line guide that reduce the kinking angle between the line and the guide frame, which only partially resolves the drag issue. Another less-successful modification involves having an open-and-shut "gate" as a line guide, which unfortunately can catch and trap the line between the gaps of the shutter.

In 2011, Japanese fishing tackle brand Daiwa introduced its famous TWS (T-Wing System) design, which have a T-shaped/inverted trianguloid line guide that has a broad top section that presents a much wider channel for line exit, while during retrieval the top bar tilts back and down to push the line into the much narrower bottom section. The TWS has become a celebrated success for Daiwa, and remained a patented trademark that was largely unchallenged for years.

Another notable 21st century line guide design, patented by the Shenzhen/New York City-based Chinese-American brand KastKing in 2023, is named the "Axis Eye" or "willowleaf guide". It has a silicon nitride-coated, rounded rectangle frame with a slightly serpentine shaped top profile, which can horizontally rotate 90° to alternate between a wide and a narrow cross-sectional width. During casting, the line guide is rotated to a transverse orientation, which presents a 17.6 mm (0.7 in)-wide line channel, allowing the line to exit with minimal drag; during retrieval, the line guide is rotated to a longitudinal orientation, which narrows the line channel down to less than 3 mm.

== Spooling ==
Reel spooling is the process of loading fishing line onto a reel. Proper spooling is essential to ensure smooth casting and consistent drag performance. Improper spooling stemming from overfilling, underfilling and winding the line with improper tension, can lead to issues like wind knots, line twists, reduced casting distance and premature line wear.

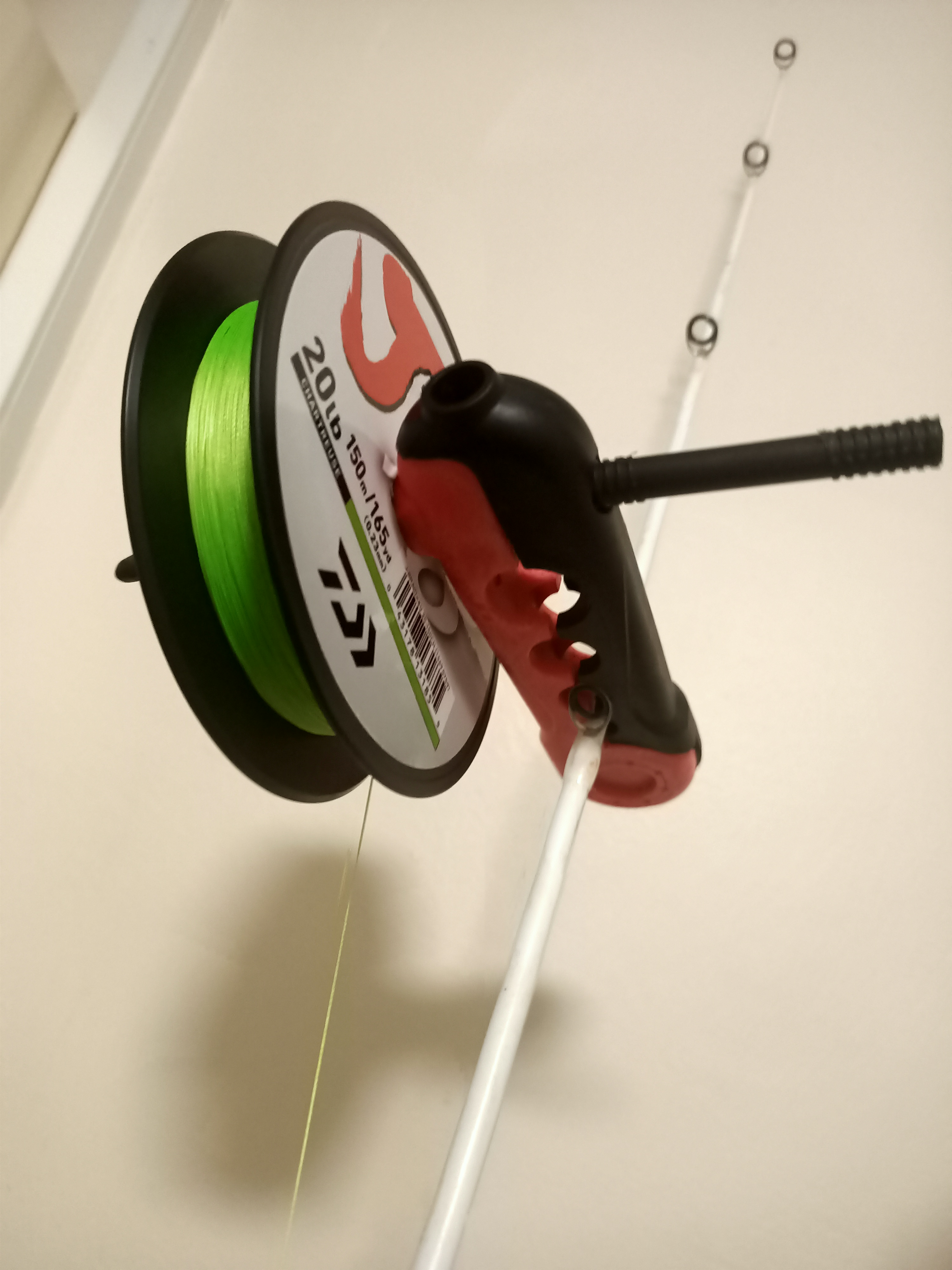
A rod-mounted line spooler that maintains steady tension when winding fishing line onto a reel.

A spooling process for spinning and threadline reels basically involves setting the bail arm to an open position and tying a fishing line to the spool with typically an Arbor knot or a Uni knot. Once the knot is secured, the bail arm is set to the closed position and the line become smoothly wound onto the spool clockwise via rotation of the reel handle, maintaining consistent moderate tension. Maintaining steady tension during spooling, is important as it keeps the line to be laid evenly and packed tightly. There are various ways to spool a reel under tension, including using dedicated specialized tools like a "line spooler", or having a partner use a screwdriver or pencil and a cloth to maintain tension while winding the line. Spooling should generally stop when the reel is filled 1/8 inch below its rim to avoid overfilling.

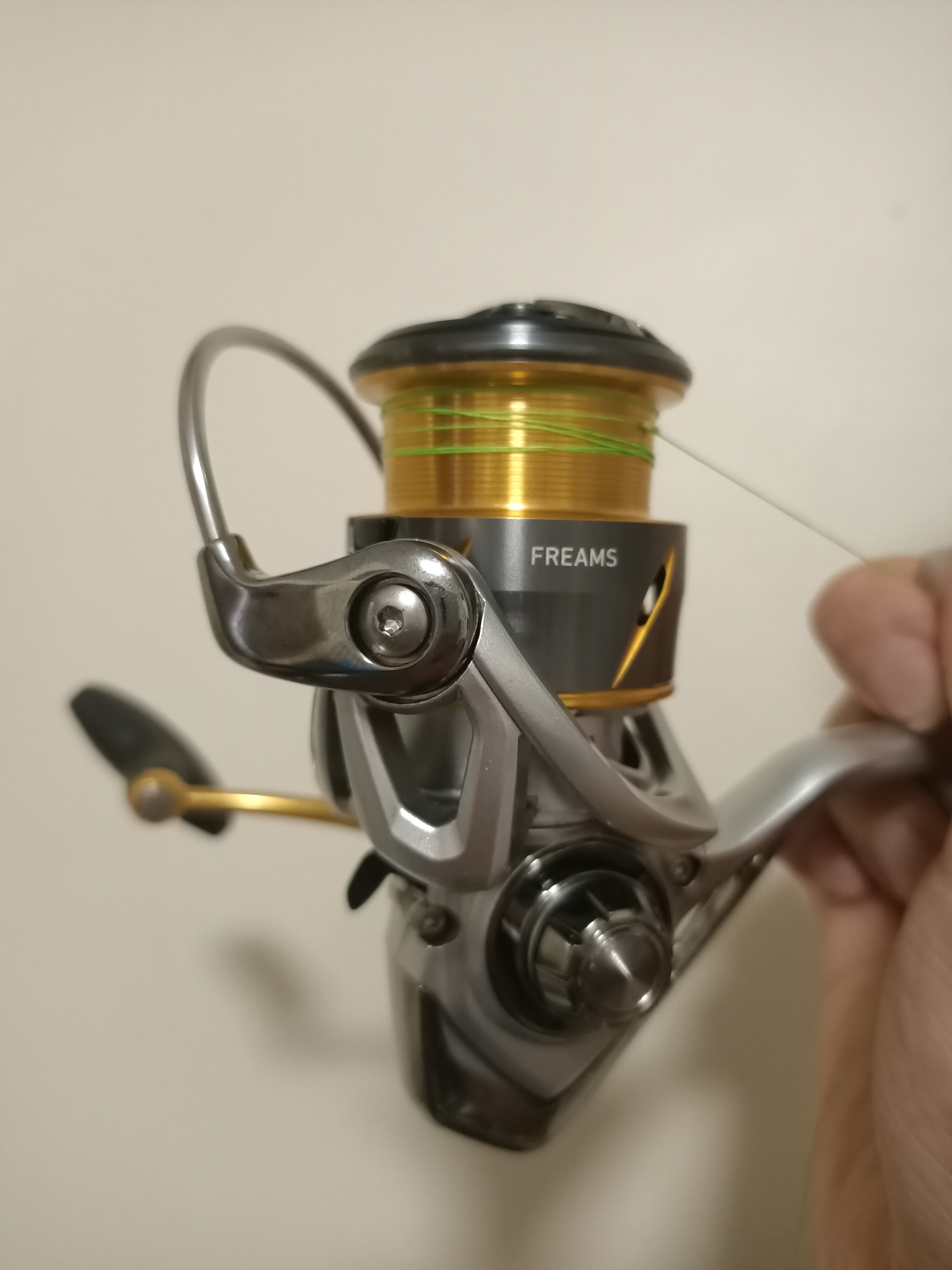
A spinning reel with the bail arm open and the fishing line tied to the spool

Fishing reels typically have their own line guide specifications, and it is essential to not exceed the maximum limit on the diameter and length of the line it can accommodate. Exceeding these limits like overfilling the reel, can negatively affect reel performance, and result in issues like tangles. Whereas going well under these limits can cause the casting distance to be affected by resistance, in which the line will suddenly stop mid-air when casting due to not enough line for casting the weighted rig. Repeated exposure to such abnormal resistance during casting, can contribute to premature line wear.

== Notable brands ==
Japan

- Shimano
- Daiwa

United States

- Pure Fishing
  - ABU Garcia
  - Penn Reels
  - Pflueger
  - Shakespeare Fishing Tackle
- Orvis
  - Scientific Anglers

Australia

- Alvey Reels

== See also ==
- Angling
- Bass fishing
- Fishing line
- Fishing rod
- Fly fishing
