= Alvey (surname) =

Alvey is a surname and occasional given name. Notable people with this name include:

- Brian Alvey (born 1970), American entrepreneur
- David Alvey, American politician
- Henry Alvey (1550–1627), English Anglican bishop
- Mark Alvey (born 1980), Australian rules football player
- Richard Alvey (priest) (died 1584), English clergyman
- Richard H. Alvey (1826–1906), American jurist
  - SS Richard H. Alvey, a Liberty ship named after him
- Robb Alvey (born Robert Lee), American roller coaster reviewer and video game producer
- Sam Alvey (born 1986), American martial artist
- Thomas Alvey (1645–1704), English physician
- Alvey A. Adee (1842–1924), US government official
- Erasmus Alvey Darwin (1804–1881), older brother of Charles Darwin

== See also ==
- Alvey Programme, British research programme named after John Alvey
- Alvey Reels, Australian manufacturer of fishing tackle, founded by Charles Alvey
