= Friedrich Wilhelm Gustav Bruhn =

German inventor

- Born: 11 November 1853; Lübeck, Germany
- Died: 1927 (aged 73–74); Berlin, Germany
- Occupation: Inventor

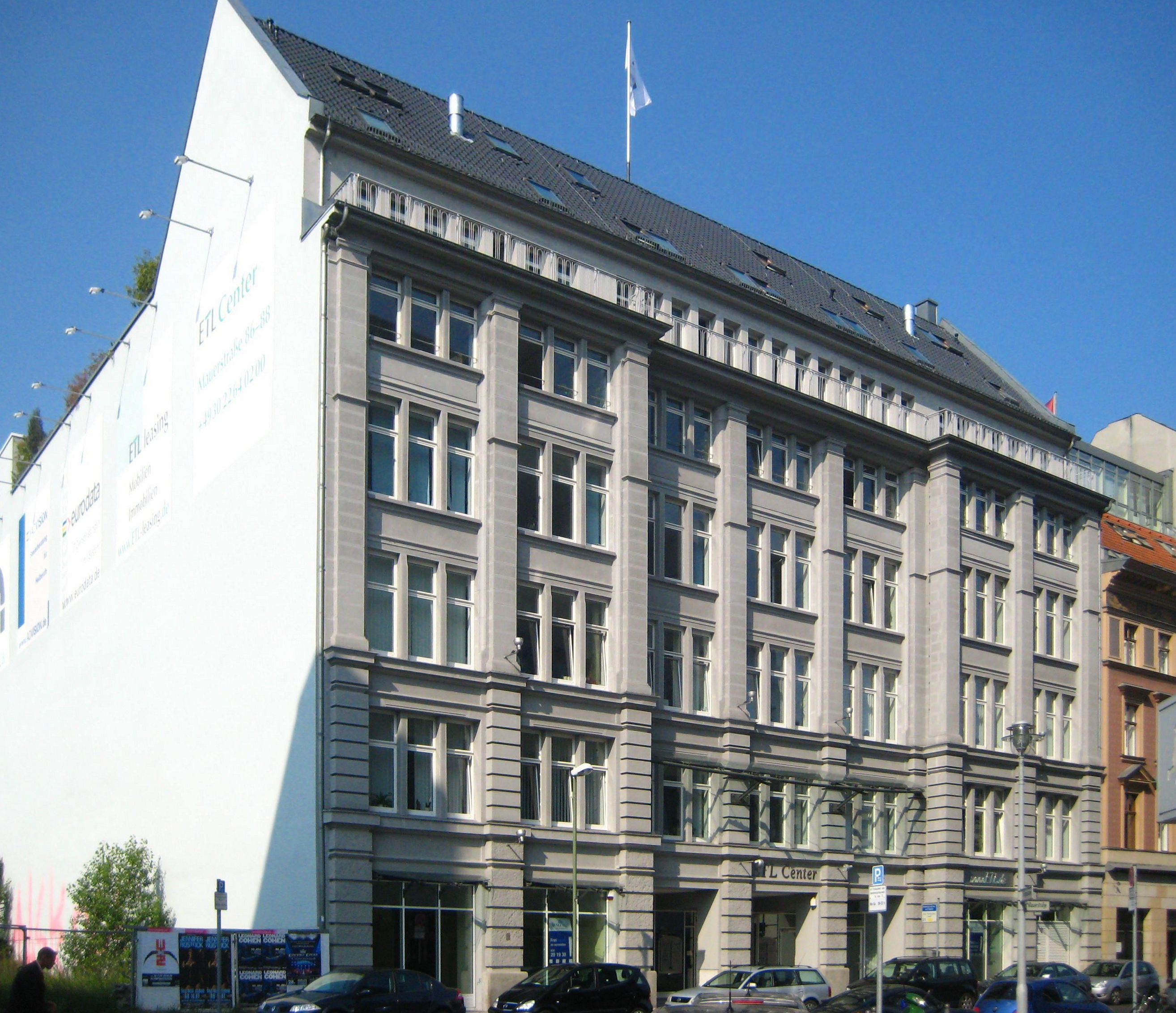
Company seat in Berlin, Westendarp & Pieper, Mauerstraße 86/88

Friedrich Wilhelm Gustav Bruhn (11 November 1853 – 1927) was a German inventor.

== Life ==
Bruhn invented modern taximeter in Berlin. He worked for German company Westendarp & Pieper Hamburg. In 1920 he became leader of this company. Bruhn was married and had three children. His daughter Adele married architect Ludwig Mies van der Rohe. His son Wolfgang Bruhn was an art historian.

== Literature ==
- Zeitschrift für das gesamte Local- und Straßenbahn-Wesen, Bde. 8–10, Bergmann 1889, S. 158.
- Der Motorwagen. Automobiltechnische Zeitschrift, 25:1922, S. 123.
- Zeitschrift für Flugtechnik und Motorluftschifffahrt, Bd. 9:1918, S. XXIII
