= George W. Snyder =

George W. Snyder (c.1780 – February 10, 1841) was an American watchmaker, silversmith and inventor from Paris, Kentucky. He is credited with inventing the first American-made fishing reel in 1820.

== Kentucky Reel ==
Snyder was born in the same county as Daniel Boone — Bucks County, Pennsylvania. In about 1803 he went to Paris, Kentucky (then called Hopewell), and died there on February 10, 1841, aged 60 years old. He was a skillful watchmaker and silversmith; being a good practical angler, and seeing the necessity for a rapid multiplying reel for black bass fishing with the live minnow, he proceeded to invent one. Snyder's first reel was made for his own use, about 1810. He afterward made reels for members of his club, and others.

Snyder's reel was a trolling reel designed for fly fishing, named the Kentucky Reel. Without patent or trademark protection, the Kentucky Reel was quickly copied by many others, including Meek, Milam, Sage, Hardman and Gayle. These artisans were trained in jewelry fabrication and were experienced in cutting gears, constructing small parts, and doing precision work. In time, the Kentucky Reel was mass-produced by the emerging factories located in the Northeast, where they could be produced at a fraction of the cost and time required for hand-built construction. The availability of more affordable fly reels greatly stimulated the sales and popularity of fly fishing equipment, and was soon applied to bait casting reels, resulting in a surge in the popularity of fishing as a pastime among all levels of American society.

== New York Reel ==
During the middle of the 19th century, another fly reel was invented in New York City. The "New York Reel" was usually made out of brass or nickel silver, and it was much heavier than the Kentucky Reel. It had a serpentine crank or a "ball-handle".

== See also ==
- Fishing reel
