= Ohmer fare register =

Fare collection device

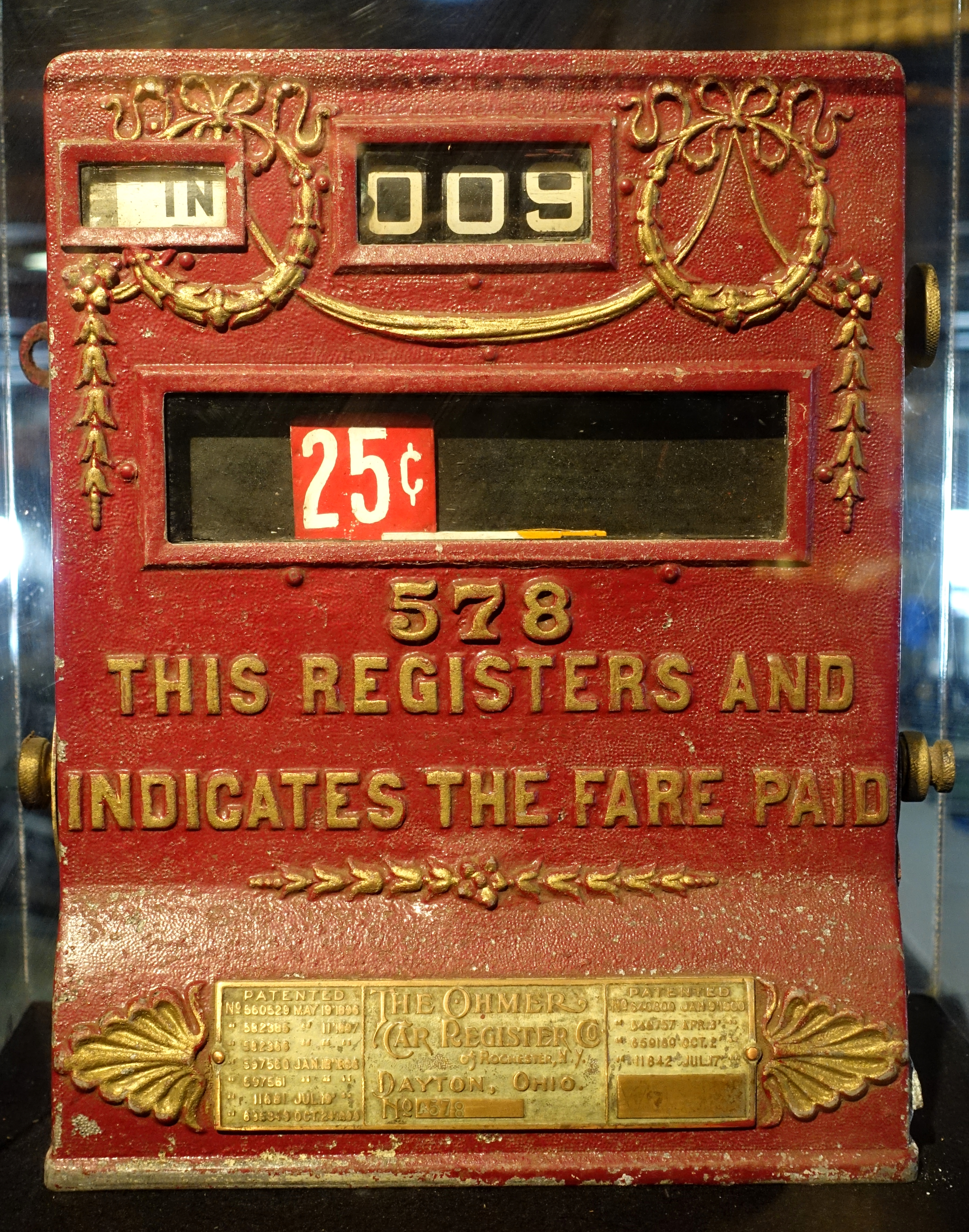
An Ohmer Fare Register

The Ohmer fare register was, in various models, a mechanical device for registering and recording the fares of passengers on streetcars, buses and taxis in the early 20th century. It was invented and improved by members and employees of the Ohmer family of Dayton, Ohio, especially John F. Ohmer who founded the Ohmer Fare Register Company in 1898, and his brother Wilfred I. Ohmer of the Recording and Computing Machines Company of Dayton, Ohio. This latter company employed up to 9,000 people at one time and was a major manufacturer of precision equipment during World War I. It was subsequently renamed the Ohmer Corporation and in 1949, acquired by Rockwell Manufacturing Company.

Fare registers on city buses were replaced by fare boxes by the middle of the 20th century, and today by ticket or card machines. Ohmer fare registers can be found in use and on display at trolley museums throughout the U.S.

A station on the Sacramento Northern line through Concord, California, was called "Ohmer", named for the Ohmer company and its fare register. The site is now occupied by the North Concord/Martinez Station of the Bay Area Rapid Transit system.

== See also ==
- Taximeter
