= Taximeter =

Mechanical or electronic device for calculating passenger fares

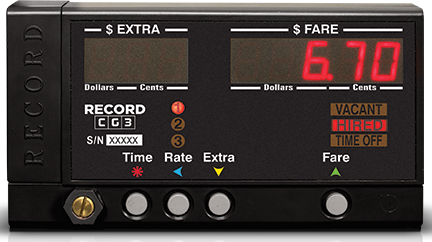
North American taximeter

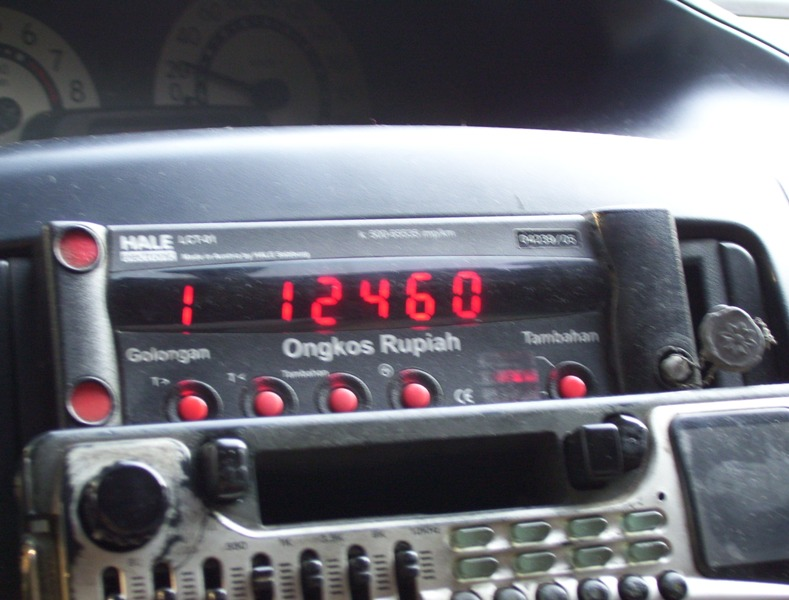
Indonesian taximeter

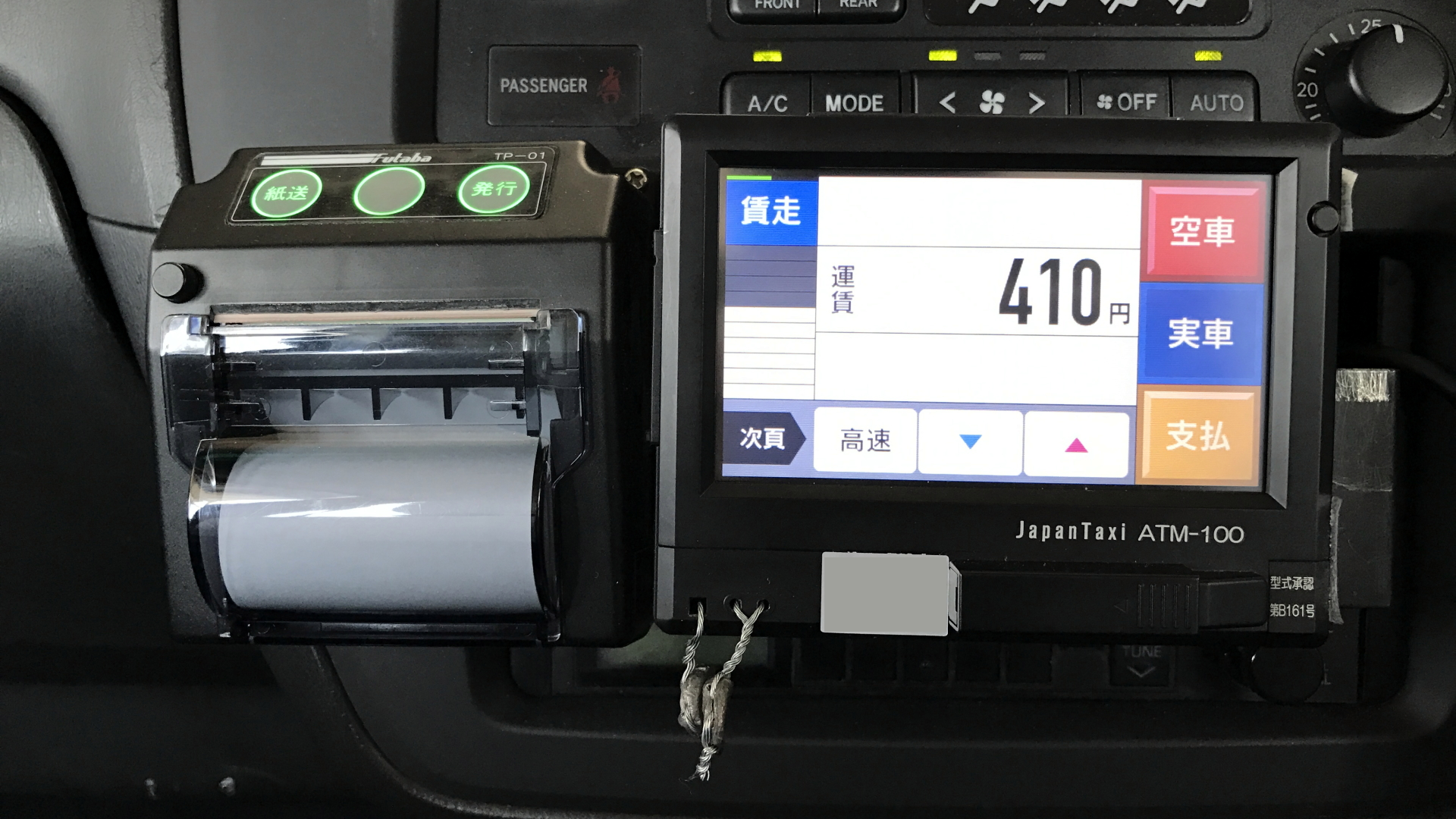
Japanese taximeter

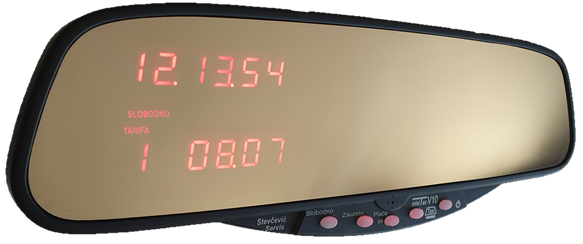
Serbian taximeter

A taximeter or fare meter is a mechanical or electronic device installed in taxicabs and auto rickshaws that calculates passenger fares based on a combination of distance travelled and waiting time. Its shortened form, "taxi", is also a metonym for the hired cars that use them.

== History ==
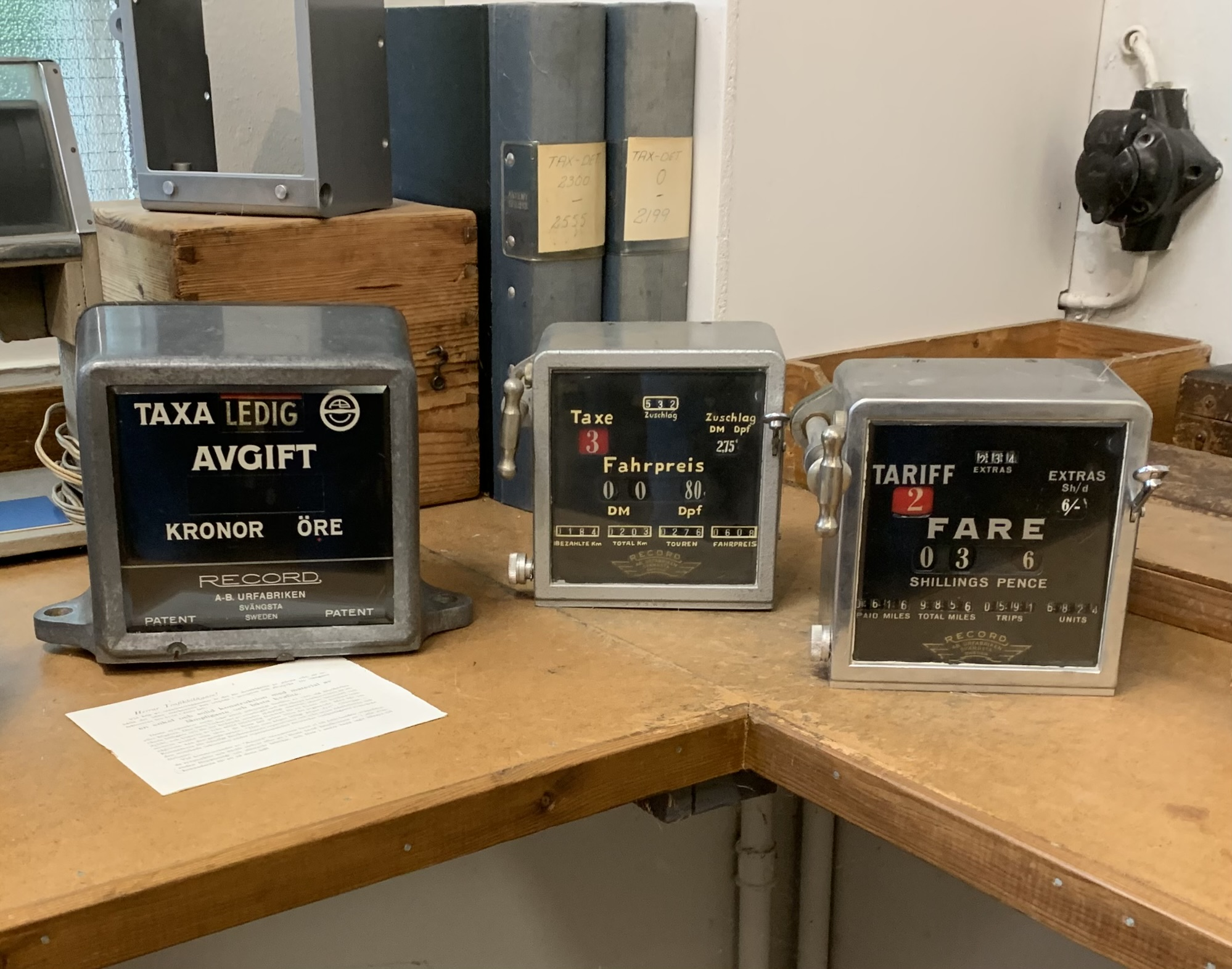
Taximeters manufactured by ABU in Sweden. Left to right: Swedish, German, English.

Argentine Taximeter "Digitax Printer" in "Libre" (Available) mode

The modern taximeter was invented by German Friedrich Wilhelm Gustav Bruhn in 1891, and the Daimler Victoria—the world's first meter-equipped (and gasoline-powered) taxicab—was built by Gottlieb Daimler in 1897.

Taximeters were originally mechanical and mounted outside the cab, above the driver's side front wheel. Meters were soon relocated inside the taxi, and in the 1980s electronic meters were introduced. There are some companies that claiming invention of the world's first electronic taximeter including Monitex in Israel.

== k constant ==
Constant expressed in pulses per kilometre which represents the number of pulses the taximeter must receive in order to correctly indicate a distance traveled of one kilometer.

== Functioning ==
Taximeters, when they are installed to the taxis, require adjustment of k constant. During the movement, car generates signal which transmitted to the taximeter. Number of signals transmitted per k constant ratio results distance travelled. Within pre-installed tariff values and travel data are multiplied and fare is calculated.

== Accessories and features ==
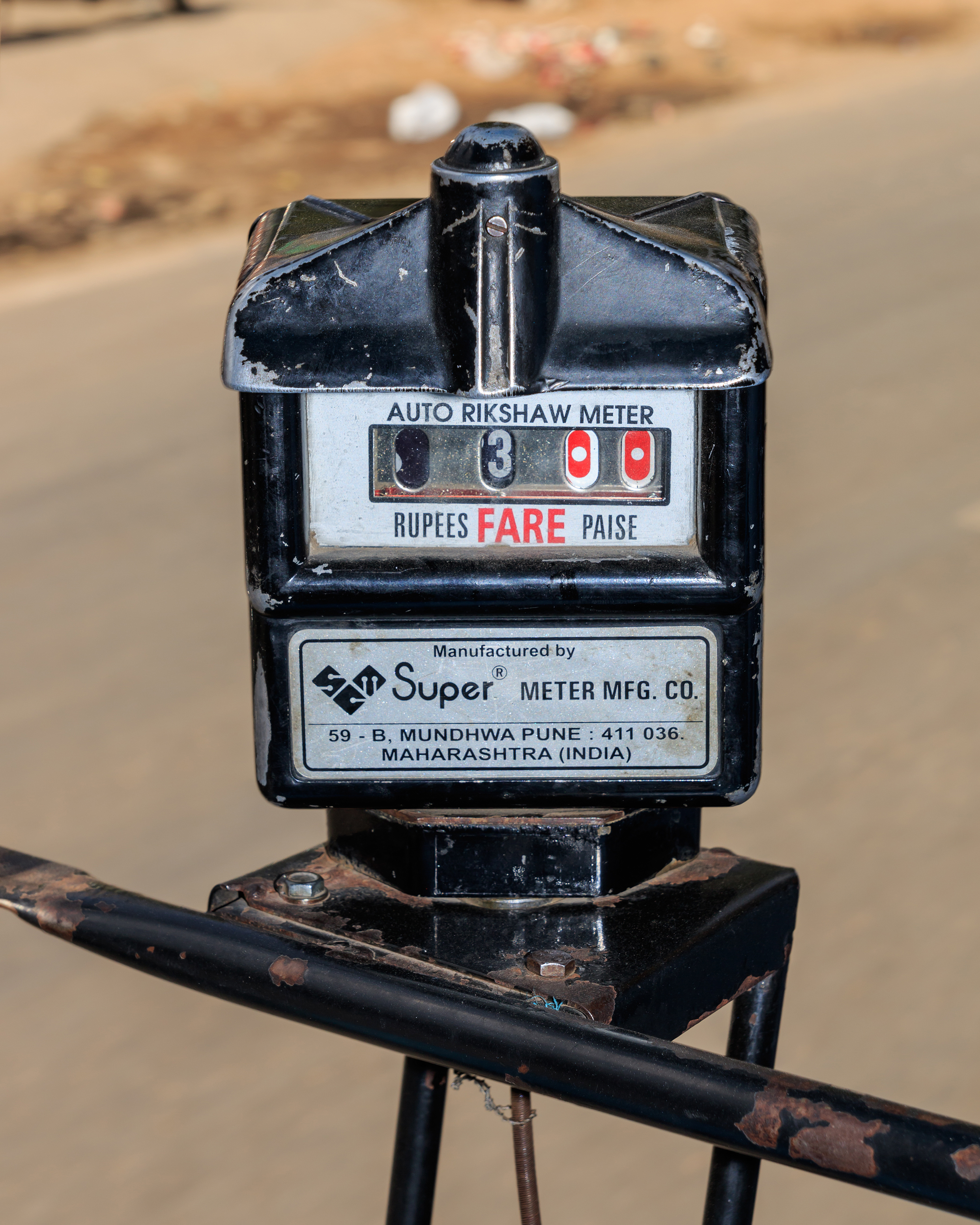
Mechanical autorickshaw meter in India

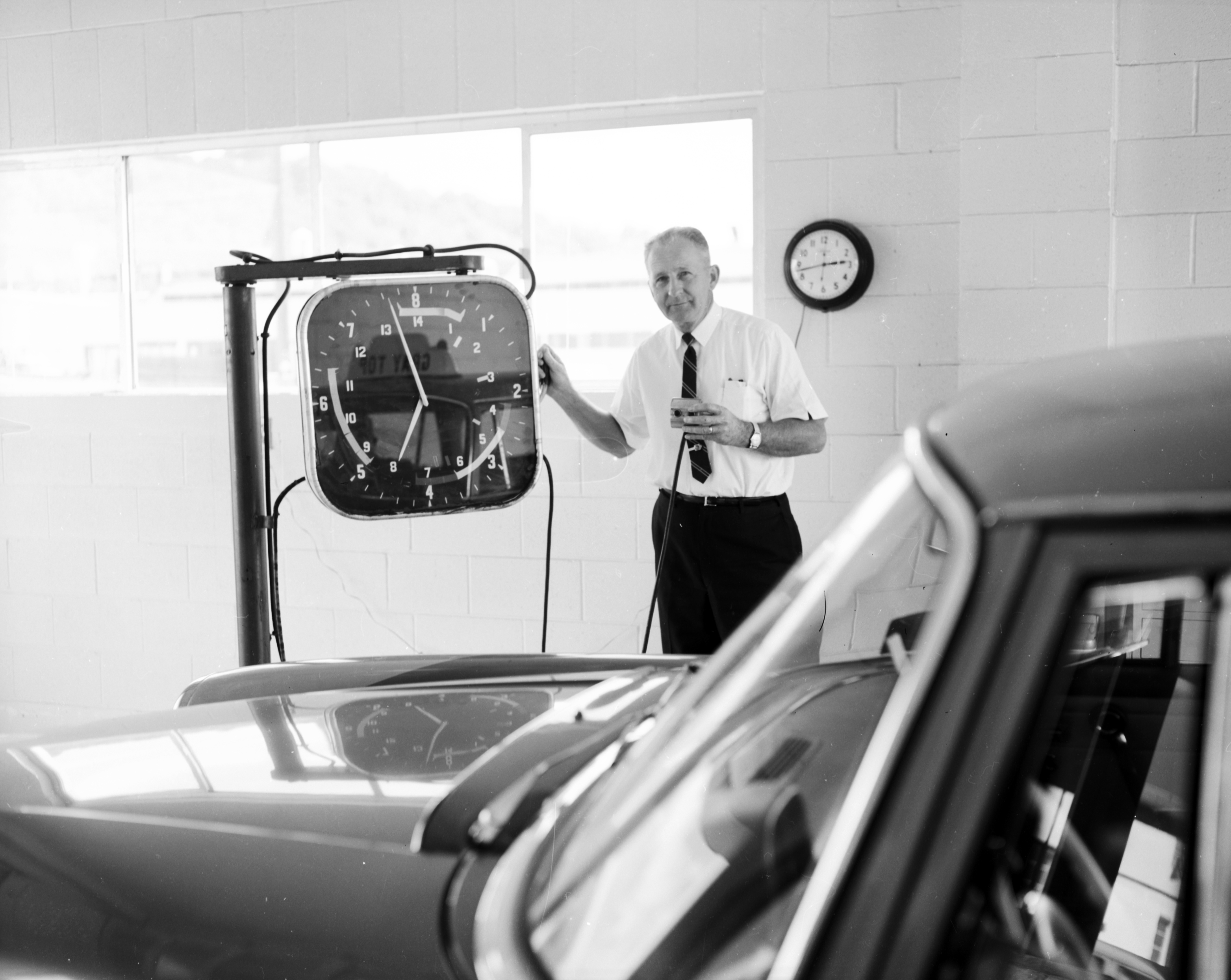
Calibrating a taximeter, Seattle circa 1960s

Taximeters can include several accessories, or act as components in larger dispatching/control systems. Features include:

- Ticket/receipt printer.
- Fraud control and prevention (on the part of the owner or operator), through the impression of control tickets or computer monitoring. Additionally, taximeters are often visually sealed by a municipal weights and scales authority after initial calibration.
- Radio communication, allowing trip status to be monitored by a dispatcher or supervisor.
- Dispatching of trip assignments through radio or data systems.
- Interaction with GPS systems to assist with dispatching and to provide security.
- Seat sensors that detect the presence of a passenger (to prevent a cab from carrying fares without activating the taximeter).
- Credit or prepaid card support.
- Bluetooth support for communication with smartphones or tablets.
- USB support for setup, diagnostics, and connectivity to the vehicle computer.

== Work cycle ==
During normal operation, taximeters repeat cyclically through several stages:

- Free (or For Hire in the UK): The taxicab is empty and available for hire. The luminous sign, if present, is switched on.
- Occupied (or Hired): The taximeter enters in this stage at the start of the trip and the "Free" sign is switched off. In this stage the running fare and the present tariff are displayed. Additional information that can be displayed in this mode includes extras (e.g. credits for luggage), present time, speed, etc.
- To Pay (or Stopped in the UK): At the end of the trip, the driver enters this stage to collect payment, make change, and optionally print a receipt. The exterior roof light may also blink to alert potential passengers that the taxi will soon be available.

== See also ==
- Taxicab
- Ohmer fare register
- Mobile data terminal
- Odometer
- Speedometer
- Tachometer
