= Penn Reels =

American fishing tackle manufacturer

Penn Fishing Tackle Manufacturing Company
- Company type: Division of Pure Fishing
- Industry: fishing tackle
- Founded: 1932
- Headquarters: Philadelphia, Pennsylvania
- Key people: John Doerr, CEO; Bill Sterback, Vice President of Manufacturing
- Products: Fishing tackle
- Revenue: undisclosed
- Website: www.pennfishing.com

Penn Fishing Tackle Manufacturing Company is an American manufacturer of fishing tackle, primarily known for making heavy-duty fishing reels and rods.

== History ==
Otto Henze immigrated from Germany to the United States in 1922. At 25, he worked as a machinist for the fishing reel manufacturer Ocean City Manufacturing Company of Philadelphia, Pennsylvania. In 1932, Henze rented a 3rd floor loft on 492 North Third Street in Philadelphia from a general machinist firm, William Schmitz & Company. There he completed his first two reel designs, the Model F and Model K.

In February 1933, the first Penn reels were sold to the Miller Auto Supply Company in Harrisburg, Pennsylvania. Encouraged by the sales, Henze developed two more designs. Privation during the Great Depression forced families into subsistence fishing, aiding company growth. In 1942, Penn Reels moved to West Hunting Park Avenue. Upon Henze's death in 1948, his wife Martha assumed the company presidency. Penn Reels grew from a regional presence to a world leader in the years that followed.

== Early reels ==
The Penn Model F was a surf fishing reel designed for long-distance casting. It had bakelite side plates and weighed twelve ounces. This model was a surf reel used mainly for surf fishing. The similar Model K added a lever actuated free spool and durable metal reinforced plates. It was offered with and without a star drag. An adjustable bearing allowed the spool be tightened to prevent backlash.

In 1933 the Model F was renamed the Sea Hawk, the basic Model K the Bayside, and the Model K with star drag the Long Beach. The choice of coastal Atlantic and Pacific cities for the former K models reinforced their connection to saltwater fishing.

In 1936, a revolutionary new reel was introduced to catch the most challenging game fish, the Senator. Immediately successful, it led to numerous fishing records being set, and remains popular, known for its high quality and dependability. It featured high speed stainless pinion gears for taking in line faster and was well adapted to the extra demands of professionally guided charter fishing.

In 1938, an exceptional surf casting reel, the “Squidder”, was introduced. It too became highly popular with anglers and charter boating. Many remain in use.

== Today ==
Penn Fishing manufactures over 220 models of saltwater reels, which have been used to set more than 1,400 IGFA world records. Their primary products include the Senator and Jig Master reels, as well as the Power Stick and Tuna Stick rods.

In 2006, Penn’s Torque reel was named the America Sport fishing Association’s Saltwater Reel of the year.

In 2003, the Penn Fishing Reels Company was acquired by rival tackle companies Sea Striker Inc. and Master Fishing Tackle. It was acquired in 2007 by K2 Sports. Jarden acquired K2 Sports and added Penn Reels to its Pure Fishing portfolio of fishing tackle manufacturers and marketing companies. Newell Brands took control of Pure Fishing when it acquired the Jarden Corporation in April 2016. In January 2019, Penn Reels, together with associated companies forming Pure Fishing, was sold by Newell Brands to Sycamore Partners for $1.3 billion.
