= Abu Garcia =

Fishing reel and equipment manufacturing company founded in Svängsta, Sweden

- Predecessors: AB Urfabriken (1920s-1980), Charles Garcia & Company of New York / Garcia Corporation (1947 to 1978)
- Founders: Carl August Borgström (ABU)

Abu Garcia, originally AB Urfabriken (Swedish: "Watch Factory Ltd."), then ABU Svängsta, is a fishing reel and equipment manufacturing company founded in Svängsta, Sweden, and is now owned by Pure Fishing conglomerate of the United States.

== Early history ==
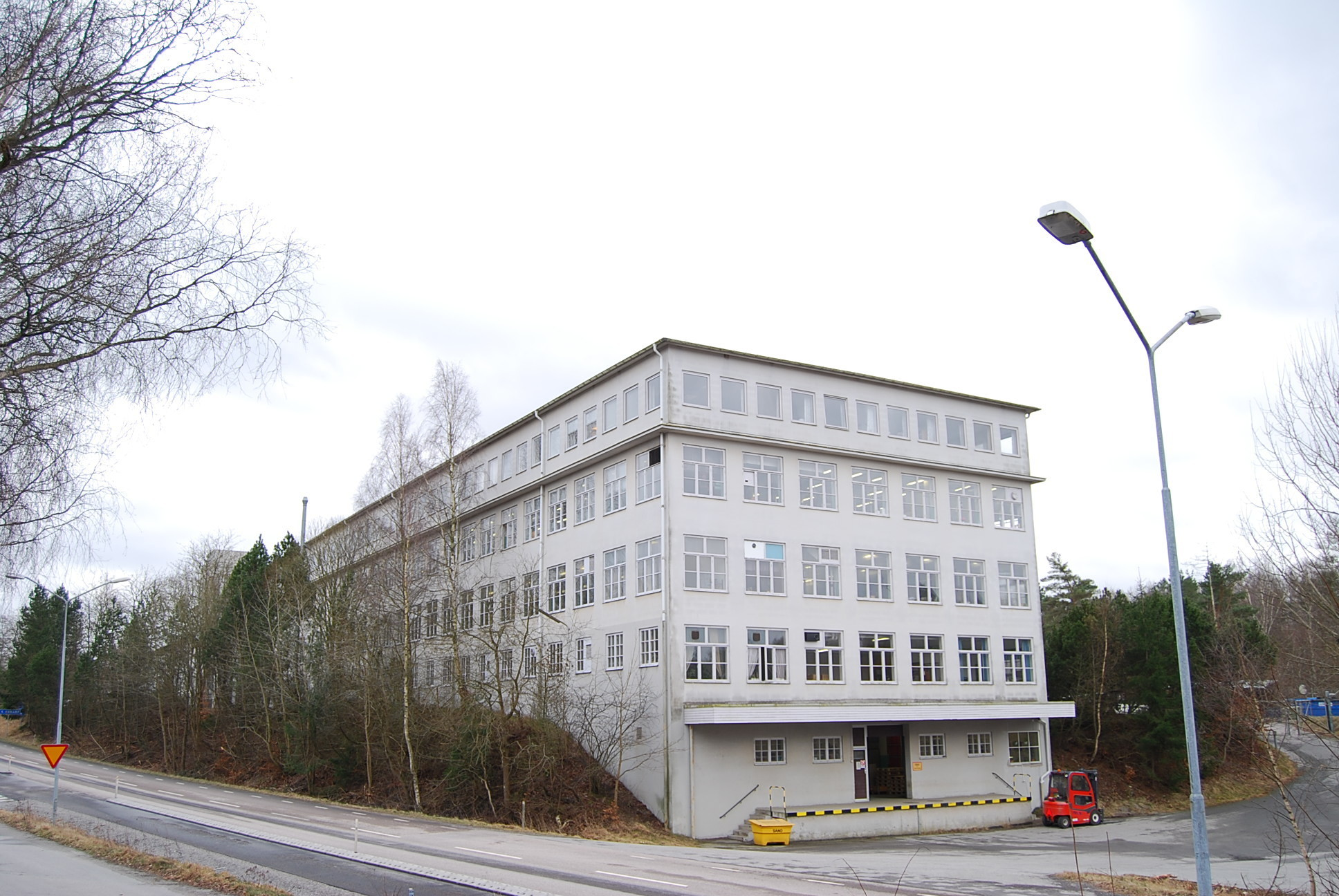
The factory in Svängsta where there still is production. Photo taken from the north.

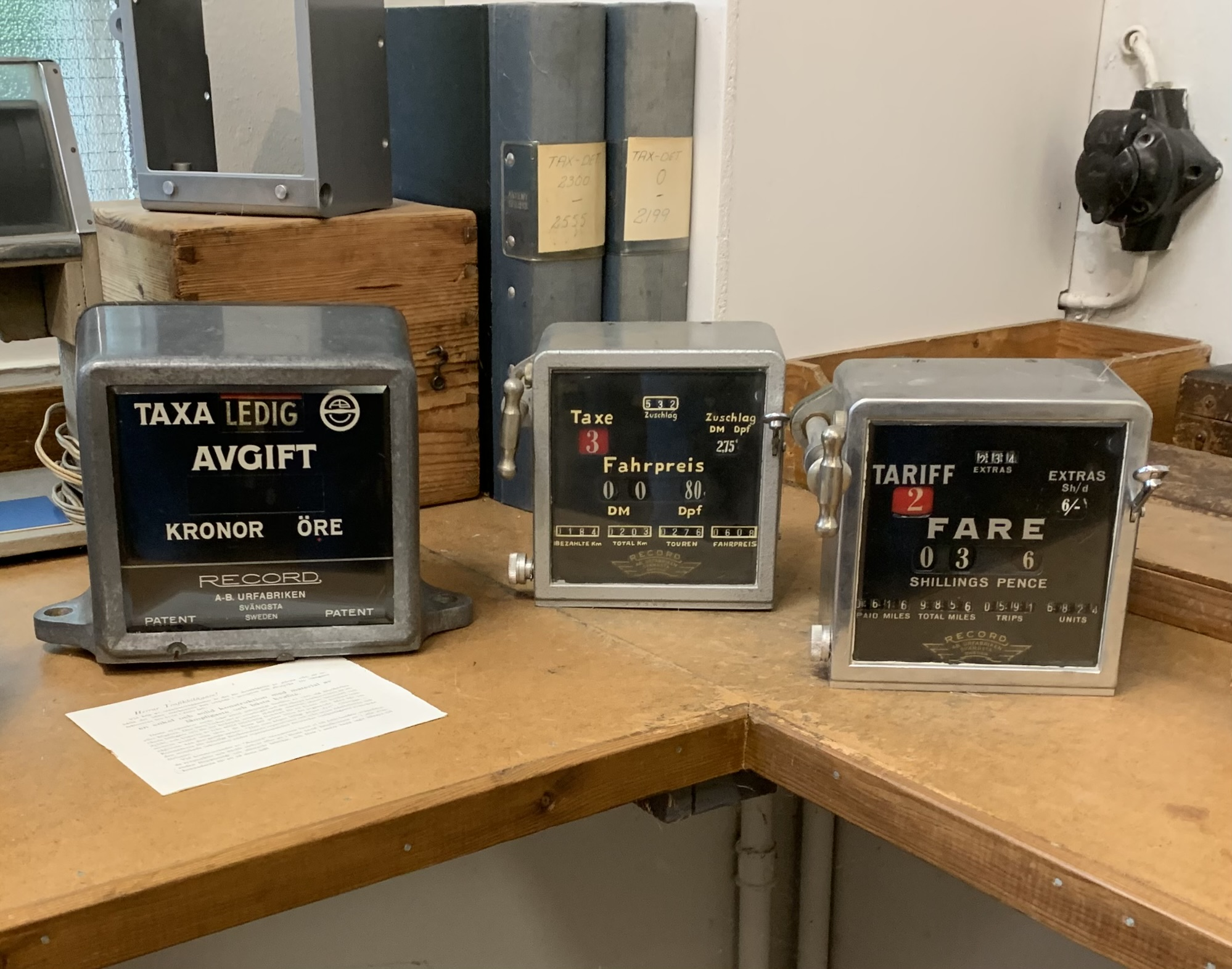
Taximeters made by ABU. Photographed at the ABU Museum in Svängsta.

AB Urfabriken began at a factory located near the Mörrum River in Svängsta, Blekinge, Sweden. The company, founded in 1921, originally manufactured watches, telephone timers and taximeters. However, the founder's son, Göte Borgström, a fishing enthusiast, soon redirected its focus towards fishing reels during World War II, when demand for those traditional products diminished.

The leading American outdoor sports participant distributing and manufacturing firm Garcia Corporation (1947–1978) was the largest fishing tackle company of its time, formerly known under the earlier name Charles Garcia & Company, New York City. The Garcia Corporation started importing and marketing ABU Svängsta's many reels in the 1950s, including the famous "Ambassadeur" reels.

Garcia Co. was already involved in the importing, marketing and distributing of the Mitchell 300 spinning reel from France since 1947. The Garcia Tackle Company of 1979 to 1980 was a short-lived partnership between ABU Svängsta and Mitchell S.A. of France, and in 1980, ABU Svängsta acquired the New Jersey–based Garcia Tackle Company, and changed their name to ABU Garcia. Mitchell S.A. would go their own way, but the two brands would eventually join together again under the Pure Fishing banner. In 1995, Abu Garcia became part of Outdoor Technologies Group, which in 2000 changed its name to Pure Fishing and acquired Mitchell. The group was later acquired by Jarden Corporation in April 2007. In December 2015, Newell Rubbermaid acquired Jarden Corporation, and in November 2018 sold Pure Fishing to Sycamore Partners.

== Royal Warrant ==
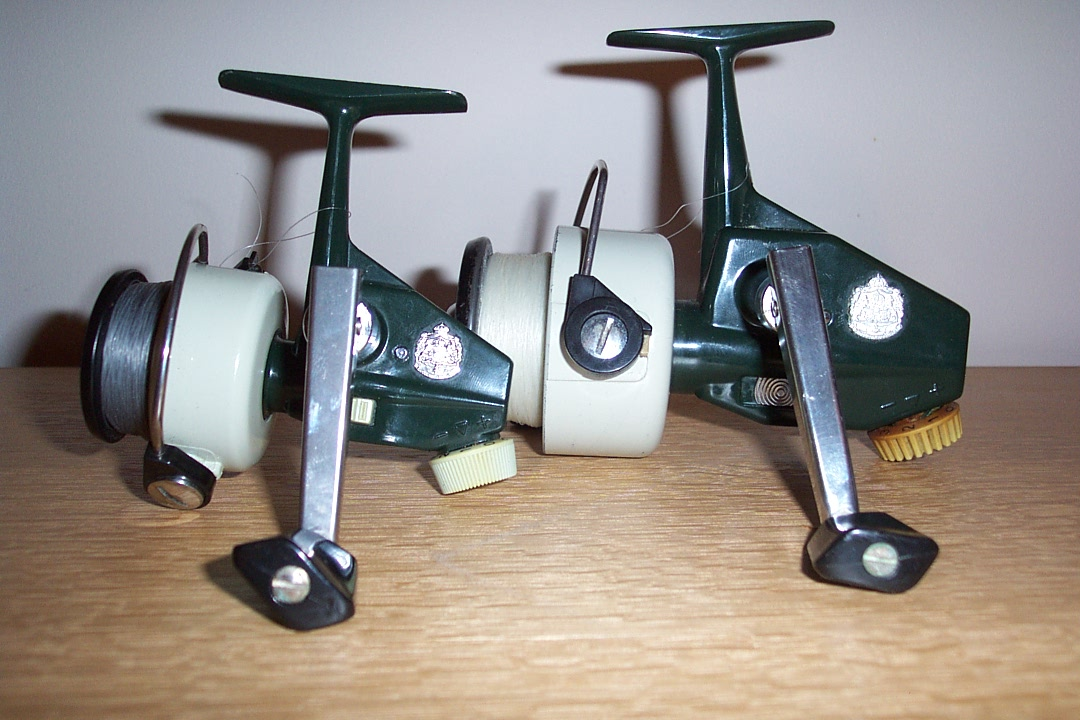
A pair of ABU reels from the end of the 1960s; the smaller is the Cardinal 33, the larger is the Cardinal 66, and the Swedish royal coat of arms, a right conferred by Royal Warrant, can be seen clearly.

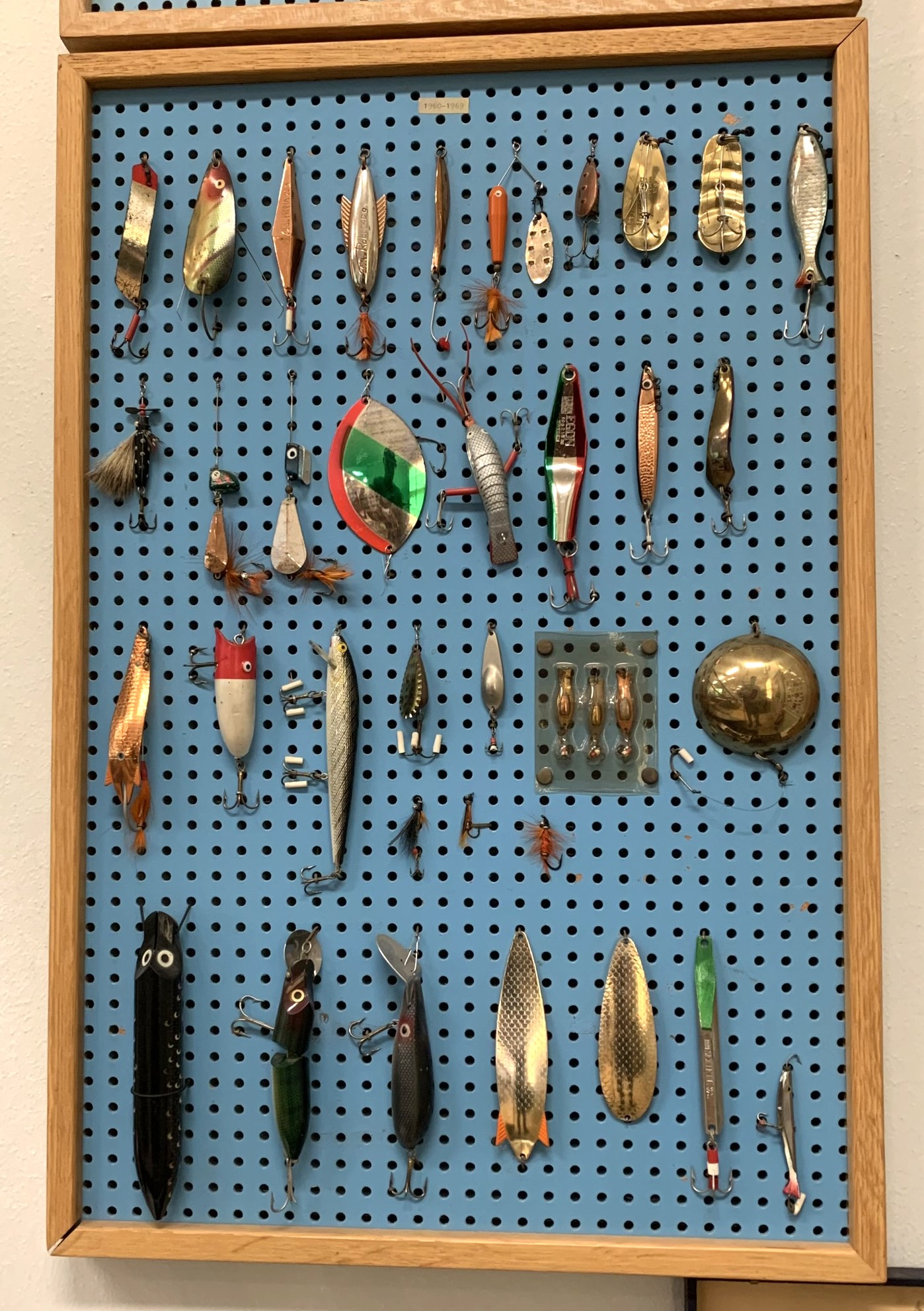
Fishing lures made by ABU in the 1960s. Photographed at the ABU Museum in Svängsta.

Many Abu Garcia products display a Royal Seal, a Swedish Royal Warrant with the title "Purveyors to the Court of Sweden" (Kunglig hovleverantör), recognizing the brand's quality and service to the Swedish royal family.

There are collectors of ABU Equipment.

== See also ==
- Comparison of hub gears
- Fishing reel
