= Thomas Alvey =

English physician (1645–1704)

Thomas Alvey M.D. (4 May 1645 – 1704) was an English physician.

Son of Thomas Alvey, merchant-taylor, of London, he was born in St. Faith's parish on 4 May 1645, and educated at Merchant Taylors' School and at Merton College, Oxford (B.A. 1662, M.A. 1667, M.B. 1669, M.D. 1671). He became a fellow of the College of Physicians of London in 1676; censor in 1683; Harveian orator in 1684; was appointed an elect in January 1703–4; and died in 1704. Dr. Alvey wrote Dissertatiuncula Epistolaris, unde pateat urinæ materiam potius è sero sanguinis quàm è sero (quod succo alibili in nervis superest), ad renes transmitti, London (1680).
