= Alvey Reels =

Australian fishing tackle manufacturer

- Industry: Retail
- Founded: 1920
- Founders: Charles Alvey
- Headquarters: Brisbane, Australia
- Area served: Worldwide
- Key people: Bruce Alvey
- Products: Fishing reels
- Parent: Gowing Bros Limited

Alvey Reels is an Australian manufacturer of fishing tackle, primarily known for fishing reels and rods. It was founded by Charles Alvey in Brisbane in 1920, making it one of Australia's oldest family-owned fishing companies.

On the 20th of July, 2017, the company announced that it would be closing. The managing director Bruce Alvey, great-grandson of the founder, said the company had "suffered a dramatic drop in sales, particularly in the last six months."

In mid-2019, Alvey was saved from closure and is still producing reels.

== History ==
Alvey Reels started in 1920 when Charles Alvey, an English migrant, saw the need for a fishing reel that was easy to use, easy to cast, simple to maintain, and solidly constructed to give many years of trouble-free angling.

Working on the basic principle of the Scottish Malloch reel, he designed a reel which allowed the body of the reel to be turned sideways when casting, permitting the line to strip freely from the edge of a specially shaped spool. This eliminated the problems of backlash and overrun common to users of the multiplying type of reel. When the reel was returned to the fishing position, it afforded the best positive direct rewind of the centrepin reel, which lost favour only because of difficulty in casting. So, the Alvey reel came into being, combining easy casting and forceful rewinding.

By 1923, the demand had become so great that Charles Alvey's son Ken, a qualified pattern maker and draftsman, joined the business and a partnership was formed. Together they steered the company into the 1930s, pouring all available profits back into new machinery and taking on more staff to increase production. By this time about 25,000 reels were being produced annually.

1939 brought the Second World War and an abrupt halt to Alvey production. Machinery was converted to assist the war effort by producing vehicle and aircraft components which were to be so essential over the following six-year period.

In 1945, efforts were once again turned to the manufacturing of fishing reels. Also, in 1945, Charles Alvey died, leaving behind his family to take over the business. Ken Alvey's son Jack joined the firm in 1946 after obtaining his qualifications with a local engineering works.

Ken Alvey died in 1973. In 1974, a flood caused severe damage to the Alvey factory. Manufacturing was brought back on line two months later. Members of the public and fishing club supporters donated their time and efforts to assist the Alvey family and staff.

Around this time, Jack Alvey's eldest son Bruce joined the company. With this union, the father and son partnership was re-established.

In 1976, the initial design for new a factory and office premises was created. In 1978, land was acquired in the Industrial estate at Carole Park, and tenders were called for construction. By September, the building had been completed.

In 1987, a major expansion of the Carole Park plant was executed, taking the buildings to the maximum size allowed on the area of land. Plastic injection moulding machines were installed, and a new range of products using the latest technology emerged.

In 1988, Jack's youngest son Glenn joined the company. The Alveys acquired the property next to theirs on the Carole Park industrial estate in 1990.

During the 1990s, there was a major change in the methods of construction of the company's most popular reels. In the early 1990s, the first graphite back/fibreglass 4” (100 mm) reel was designed and manufactured. An ‘Easy Cast’ system based on a very early 1930 system was developed and by using tough strong injection moulded plastics a new range of economy reels was started.

Larger models in the 6” (150 mm) and 6 ½” (165 mm) were added to this range in 1997-98.

In 1997, a fully vented graphite blue water saltwater fly reel was added to the Alvey range in place of the older heavier metal and fibreglass SWF reel. Reels were exported to the USA, New Zealand and UK.

2000 saw the release of the vented 6500 series reels followed by the 6000 series in mid-2001.

In June 2001, Jack Alvey died from cancer. In 1999, Jack was awarded an OAM for his efforts in promoting recreational fishing and strongly supporting junior anglers wherever possible.

Late 2001 saw the release of the first graphite vented 825 series boat reels. This used a graphite back and vented spool to keep weight down but still offered the angler a powerful low maintenance reel for deep sea fishing.The 825BCV Model also incorporated a rapid retrieve handle plate system.

In 2008, the Turbo Cast System was developed. This injection moulded component stands the reel slightly further off the rod to increase the line flow during casting which will improve distance. 2011 saw the importing of the first ever overseas made reel.

Since 2000, Alvey have built their range of imported fishing rods to 16 Models in 2012. These cover children's rods through to surf models, a specialist blackfish Rod, and telescopic rods.

2014 saw the release of the Model 6000C8 reel. This had the traditional rolled Stainless Back with a laser cut fishtail cross and a CNC machined Anodized Alloy spool made in China for us. It also incorporated a large single plate clutch with a Carbon clutch washer.”

In July 2017, the business decided to close due to a decline in sales.

In mid-2019, Alvey Reels was sold to a business consortium, but with members of the Alvey family still continuing to hold senior positions in the organisation. In 2022, Alvey Reels was acquired by Gowings, an Australian investment company. The acquisition saved the company from being shut down.
