= Thomas Barker (fishing guide) =

- Occupation: Fishing guide
- Known for: Author of The Art of Angling (1651)

Thomas Barker (fl.1591–1651) was an English fishing guide and author of The Art of Angling (1651).

== Life ==
For more than sixty years, he practised the art of angling, and "spent many pounds in the gaining of it".

In the dedicatory address to Lord Montague, the author tells us that he was born at "Bracemeol in the liberty of Salop (ie Meole Brace in the vicinity of Shrewsbury, Shropshire), "being a freeman and burgess of the same city(sic)".

Barker is described by Hugh Chisholm, in his Encyclopaedia Britannica (1911) article on Izaak Walton, as being "a retired cook, and humorist".

== Treatise ==
At the time of writing his treatise he was living in Westminster, and seems to have gained a livelihood by accompanying gentlemen on fishing expeditions, or giving instruction at home in the use of baits and tackle. The following invitation in the dedicatory address doubtless met a warm response:—

If any noble or gentle angler, of what degree soever he be, have a mind to discourse of any of these wayes and experiments, I live in Henry the 7th's Gifts, the next door to the gatehouse in Westm[inster].; my name is Barker; where I shall be ready, as long as please God, to satisfie them and maintain my art during life, which is not like to be long.

The remark and his alleged years of experience suggest he was of great age at the time of its publication.

== The Art of Angling ==
He was the author of The Art of Angling: wherein are discovered many rare secrets very necessary to be known by all that delight in that recreation. Written by Thomas Barker, an ancient practitioner in the said art (1651), duodecimo.

Barker's remarks on fly-fishing are quoted in Izaak Walton's Compleat Angler (1653), page 108. In the words of Barker's 19th century biographer in Dictionary of National Biography, Arthur Henry Bullen: "His directions on catching and dressing fish are equally serviceable; but it is to be regretted that this cheery "brother of the angle" advocated the use of salmon-roe bait, a pernicious doctrine unknown, or at least unpublished, before his time." The Art of Angling met with good success, and passed through several editions. In the edition of 1657, and in later editions, the title is "Barker's Delight, or the Art of Angling".
