= Pflueger (fishing) =

Pflueger is a brand of fishing tackle products and a subsidiary of Pure Fishing.

In 1880, Ernest A. Pflueger started the Enterprise Manufacturing Company in Akron, Ohio to make fishing tackle.

In 1883, Ernest patented the use of phosphorescent paint on artificial fishing lures, which lead to tremendous growth for their fishing lures and 50 more inventions.

The company's name was changed to E.A. Pflueger Company and became one of the largest fishing equipment makers in America. The company would go on to develop the popular Pflueger Akron and the Summit casting reels.
