= Fly fishing =

Angling technique

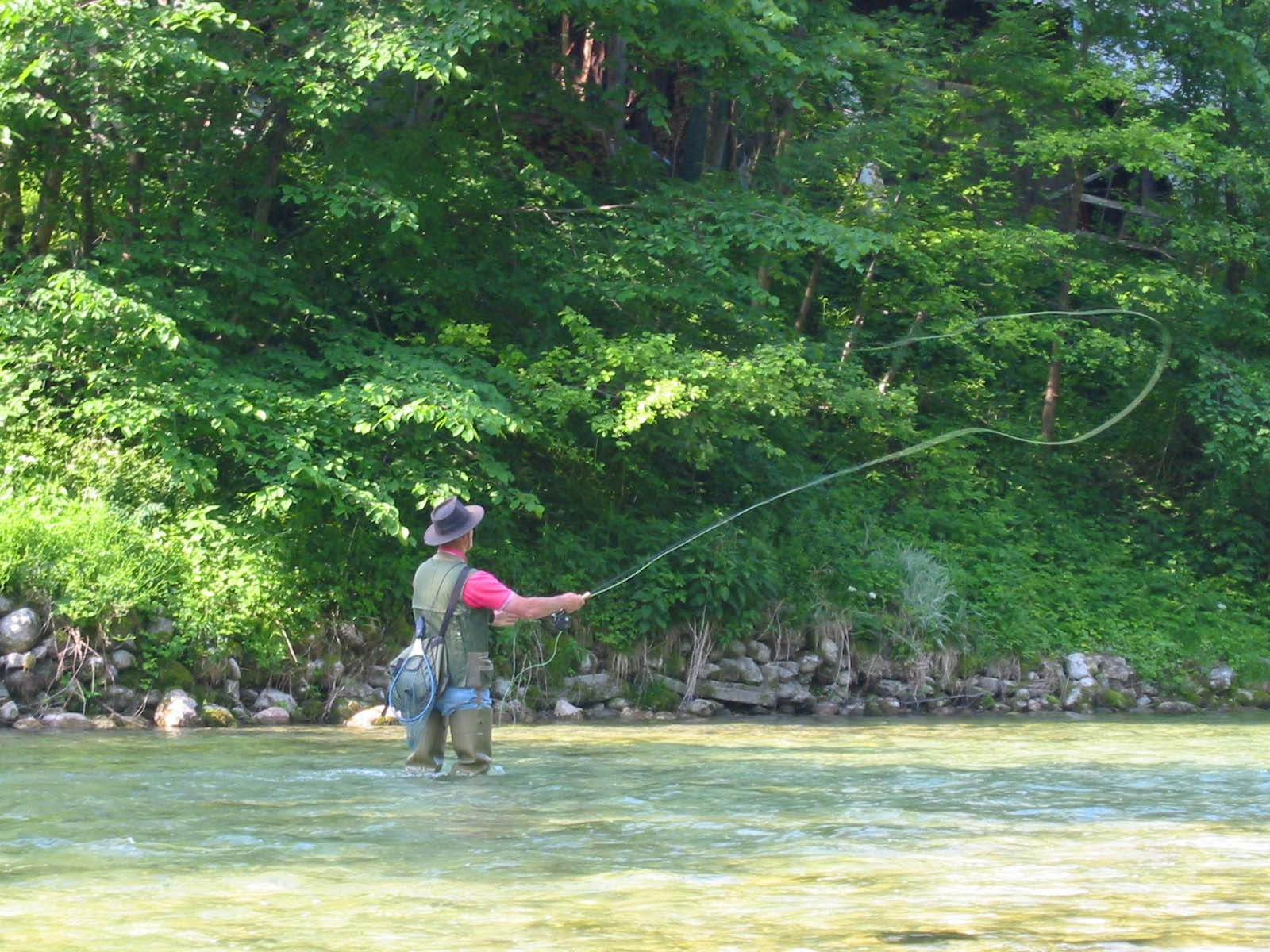
Man fly fishing in the Sava.

Fly fishing is an angling technique that uses an ultra-lightweight fishing lure called an artificial fly, which typically mimics small invertebrates such as flying and aquatic insects to attract and catch insectivorous fish. Such lures are typically made by tying various filamentous materials (feathers, hairs/fur, synthetic fibers or yarns) to the shank of a small fish hook, creating tufts/bundles of protruding bristles that imitate setae, wing venations and other appendages aesthetically. Because the sectional density of a fly lure is insufficient to overcome air resistance (as its mass is very small, but its sectional and wetted area are often quite significant due to the fluffy exterior), it cannot be cast far using conventional gears and techniques. Casting of fly lures is done using specialized tackles, which typically involve the use of heavy-ended fly lines, and the casting techniques are significantly different from other forms of angling. It is also very common for fly anglers to wear waders, carry a hand net, and stand in the water when fishing.

Fly fishing primarily targets predatory fish (both freshwater and saltwater) that have a significant proportion of very small-sized prey (e.g. insects and nymphs, spiders, small crustaceans like shrimps and scuds, worms and even small bait fish) in their diet, such as salmonids (trout, salmon, char and graylings), bass, perches and ide. North Americans usually distinguish freshwater fishing between cold-water species (salmonids) and warm-water species (notably black bass). In Britain, where natural water temperatures vary less, the distinction is between game fishing for trout and salmon versus coarse fishing for other species. Techniques and lure choices for fly fishing vary with different aquatic habitats (e.g. lakes and ponds, small streams, large rivers,estuaries and bays, and open ocean), target species, weather and water conditions.

== Overview ==
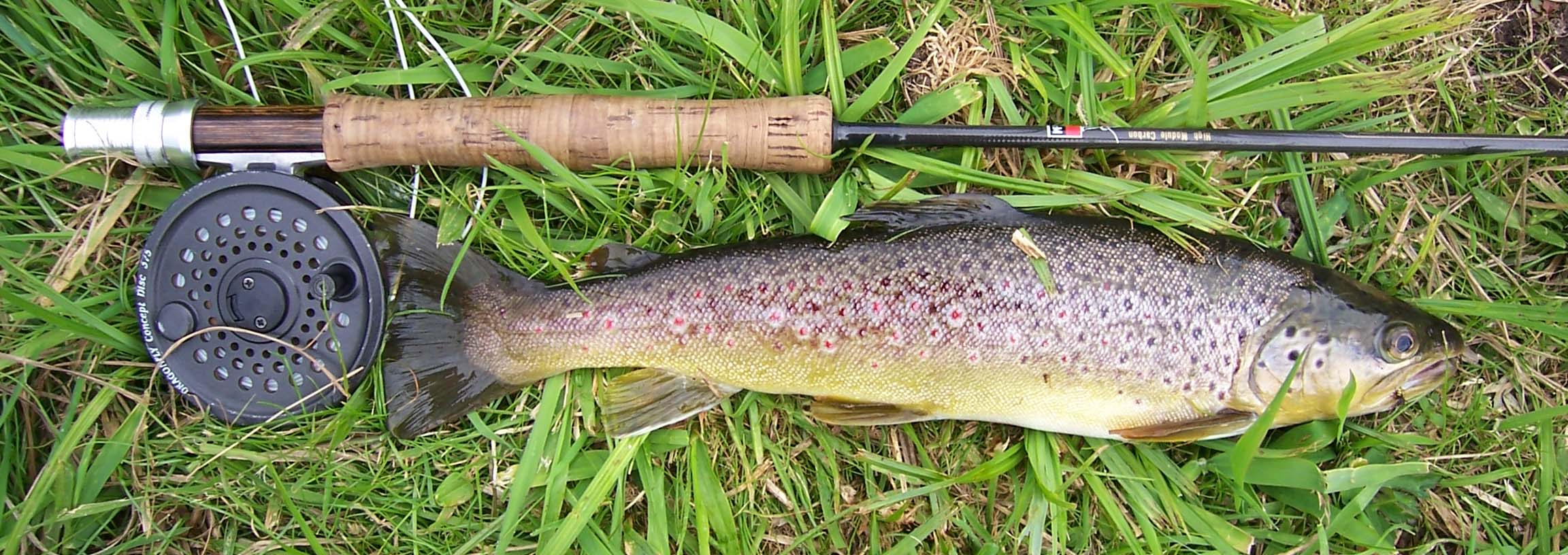
Fly rod and reel with a brown trout from a chalk stream in England

In fly fishing, fish are caught by using artificial flies that are cast with a fly rod and a fly line. The fly line (today, almost always coated with plastic) is heavy enough to send the fly to the target. The main difference between fly fishing and spin or bait fishing is that in fly fishing the weight of the line carries the hook through the air, whereas in spin and bait fishing the weight of the lure or sinker at the end of the monofilament or braided line gives casting distance. Artificial flies are of several types; some imitating an insect (either flying or swimming), others a bait fish or crustacean, others attractors are known to attract fish although they look like nothing in nature. Flies range in size from a few millimeters to 30 cm (12 in) long; most are between 1 and 5 cm (0.39 and 1.97 in). The dry fly is a floating fly which does not pierce the water surface significantly; other kinds of fly, whether floating or sinking, are often referred to as wet flies.

Artificial flies are made by fastening hair, fur, feathers, or other materials, both natural and synthetic, onto a hook. The first flies were tied with natural materials, but synthetic materials are now popular and prevalent. Flies are tied in sizes, colors and patterns to match local terrestrial and aquatic insects, bait-fish, or other prey attractive to the target fish species.

=== Fish species ===
Fly fishing is most renowned as a method for catching trout, grayling and salmon, but it is also used for a wide variety of species including pike, bass, panfish, and carp, as well as marine species, such as redfish, snook, tarpon, bonefish and striped bass. Many fly anglers catch unintended species such as chub, bream and rudd while fishing for 'main target' species such as trout. A growing population of anglers attempt to catch as many different species as possible with the fly. With the advancement of technology and the development of stronger rods and reels, larger predatory saltwater species such as wahoo, tuna, marlin and sharks have become target species on fly. Realistically any fish can be targeted and captured on fly as long as the main food source is effectively replicated by the fly itself and suitable gear is used.

== History ==
Many credit the first recorded use of an artificial fly to the Roman Claudius Aelianus near the end of the 2nd century. He described the practice of Macedonian anglers on the Astraeus River (a small Macedonian stream, the location of which is now lost):

..they have planned a snare for the fish, and get the better of them by their fisherman's craft... They fasten red wool... round a hook, and fit on to the wool two feathers which grow under a cock's wattles, and which in color are like wax. Their rod is six feet long, and their line is the same length. Then they throw their snare, and the fish, attracted and maddened by the color, comes straight at it, thinking from the pretty sight to gain a dainty mouthful; when, however, it opens its jaws, it is caught by the hook, and enjoys a bitter repast, a captive.

In his book Fishing from the Earliest Times, however, William Radcliff (1921) gave the credit to Martial (Marcus Valerius Martialis), born some two hundred years before Aelianus, who wrote:

...Who has not seen the scarus rise, decoyed and killed by fraudful flies...

The last word, somewhat indistinct in the original, is either "mosco" (moss) or "musca" (fly) but catching fish with fraudulent moss seems unlikely.

The traditional Japanese method of fly fishing is known as "Tenkara" (Japanese: テンカラ, literally: "from heaven"). Tenkara originated in the mountains of Japan as a way for professional fishermen and inn-keepers to harvest the local fish, Ayu, trout and char for selling and providing a meal to their guests. Primarily a small-stream fishing method that was preferred for being highly efficient, where the long rod allowed the fisherman to place the fly where the fish would be.

Another style of fishing in Japan is Ayu fishing. As written by historian Andrew Herd, in the book "The Fly", "Fly fishing became popular with Japanese peasants from the twelfth century onward...fishing was promoted to a pastime worthy of Bushi (warriors), as part of an official policy to train the Bushi's mind during peacetime." This refers primarily to Ayu fishing, which commonly uses a fly as lure, uses longer rods, but there is no casting technique required, it's more similar to dapping. Ayu was practiced in the lowlands (foothills), where the Bushi resided, tenkara practiced in the mountains. Fishing flies are thought to have originated in Japan for Ayu fishing over 430 years ago. These flies were made with needles that were bent into shape and used as fishing hooks, then dressed as a fly. The rods along with fishing flies, are considered to be a traditional local craft of the Kaga region.

Although anglers in Scotland and Ireland had been fishing the lochs and loughs for trout with an artificial fly for several generations (as far back as 1840 John Colquhoun listed the menus of fly dressings in his book The Moor and Loch detailing the wings, body and hackle of artificial flies in use at the time), the history of stillwater trout fishing in English reservoirs goes back little more than a century. The simple reason for that was because (apart from the Lake District which was somewhat isolated before the construction of the railways) England possessed few large stillwaters that contained trout. That all changed when the water supply reservoirs began to be built to meet the increasing demand for water from the big cities.

The earliest of these reservoirs to be stocked with trout were Thrybergh Reservoir close to Doncaster completed around 1880, Lake Vyrnwy, Powys in 1891, Ravensthorpe Reservoir in Northamptonshire in 1895 and Blagdon Lake in Somerset which was first opened as a trout fishery in 1904.

=== Origins ===
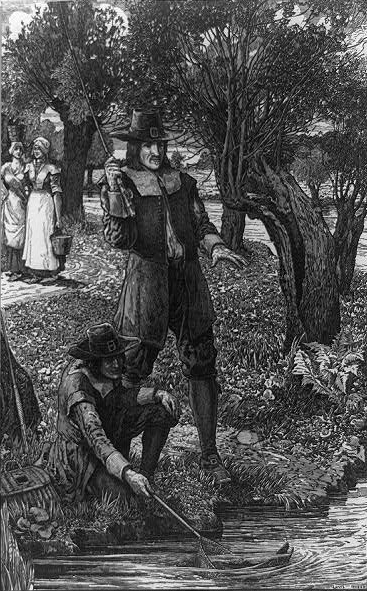
Izaak Walton's The Compleat Angler, published in 1653 helped popularize fly fishing as a sport. Woodcut by Louis Rhead, 1900.

Other than a few fragmented references little was written on fly fishing until The Treatyse on Fysshynge with an Angle was published (1496) within The Boke of Saint Albans attributed to Dame Juliana Berners. The book contains instructions on rod, line and hook making and dressings for different flies to use at different times of the year. By the 15th century, rods of approximately fourteen feet length with a twisted line attached at its tips were probably used in England.

The earliest English poetical treatise on Angling by John Dennys, said to have been a fishing companion of Shakespeare, was published in 1613, The Secrets of Angling. Footnotes of the work, written by Dennys' editor, William Lawson, make the first mention of the phrase to 'cast a fly': "The trout gives the most gentlemanly and readiest sport of all, if you fish with an artificial fly, a line twice your rod's length of three hairs' thickness... and if you have learnt the cast of the fly."

The art of fly fishing took a great leap forward after the English Civil War, where a newly found interest in the activity left its mark on the many books and treatises that were written on the subject at the time. The renowned officer in the Parliamentary army, Robert Venables, published in 1662 The Experienced Angler, or Angling improved, being a general discourse of angling, imparting many of the aptest ways and choicest experiments for the taking of most sorts of fish in pond or river. Another Civil War veteran to enthusiastically take up fishing was Richard Franck. He was the first to describe salmon fishing in Scotland, and both in that and trout-fishing with artificial fly he was a practical angler. He was the first angler to name the burbot, and commended the salmon of the River Thames.

The Compleat Angler was written by Izaak Walton in 1653 (although Walton continued to add to it for a quarter of a century) and described the fishing in the Derbyshire Wye. It was a celebration of the art and spirit of fishing in prose and verse; 6 verses were quoted from John Dennys's earlier work. A second part to the book was added by Walton's friend Charles Cotton.

Walton did not profess to be an expert with a fishing fly; the fly fishing in his first edition was contributed by Thomas Barker, a retired cook and humorist, who produced a treatise of his own in 1659; but in the use of the live worm, the grasshopper and the frog "Piscator" himself could speak as a master. The famous passage about the frog, often misquoted as being about the worm—"use him as though you loved him, that is, harm him as little as you may possibly, that he may live the longer"—appears in the original edition. Cotton's additions completed the instruction in fly fishing and advised on the making of artificial flies where he listed sixty five varieties.

Charles Kirby designed an improved fishing hook in 1655 that remains relatively unchanged to this day. He went on to invent the Kirby bend, a distinctive hook with an offset point, still commonly used today.

=== Development ===
Trading card of the Ustonson company, an early firm specializing in fishing equipment, and holder of a royal warrant from the 1760s.

The 18th century was mainly an era of consolidation of the techniques developed in the previous century. Running rings began to appear along the fishing rods, which gave anglers greater control over the cast line. The rods themselves were also becoming increasingly sophisticated and specialized for different roles. Jointed rods became common from the middle of the century and bamboo came to be used for the top section of the rod, giving it a much greater strength and flexibility.

The industry also became commercialized - rods and tackle were sold at the haberdashers store. After the Great Fire of London in 1666, artisans moved to Redditch which became a centre of production of fishing related products from the 1730s. Onesimus Ustonson established his trading shop in 1761, and his establishment remained as a market leader for the next century. He received a royal warrant and became the official supplier of fishing tackle to three successive monarchs starting with King George IV over this period.

Some have credited Onesimus with the invention of the multiplying winch, although he was certainly the first to advertise its sale. Early multiplying reels were wide and had a small diameter, and their gears, made of brass, often wore down after extensive use. His earliest advertisement in the form of a trading card date from 1768 and was entitled To all lovers of angling. A full list of the tackles he sold included artificial flies, and 'the best sort of multiplying brass winches both stop and plain'. The commercialization of the industry came at a time of expanded interest in fishing as a recreational hobby for members of the aristocracy.

The impact of the Industrial Revolution was first felt in the manufacture of fly lines. Instead of anglers twisting their own lines - a laborious and time-consuming process - the new textile spinning machines allowed for a variety of tapered lines to be easily manufactured and marketed.

British fly-fishing continued to develop in the 19th century, with the emergence of fly fishing clubs, along with the appearance of several books on the subject of fly tying and fly fishing techniques.

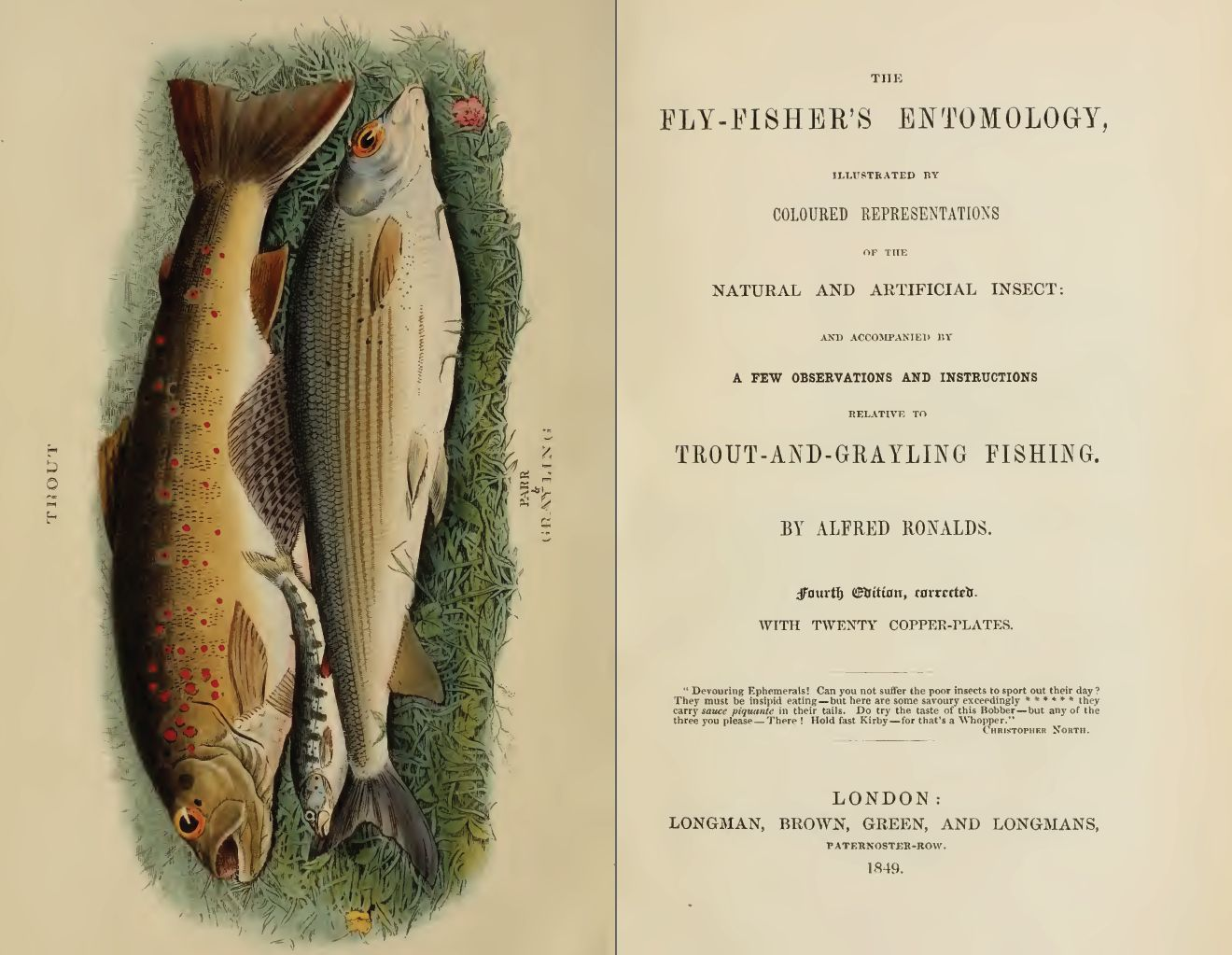
The Fly-fisher's Entomology by Alfred Ronalds had a great influence on the development of fly fishing when it was first published in 1836.

Alfred Ronalds took up the sport of fly fishing, learning the craft on the rivers Trent, Blythe and Dove. On the River Blythe, near what is today Creswell Green, Ronalds constructed a bankside fishing hut designed primarily as an observatory of trout behaviour in the river. From this hut, and elsewhere on his home rivers, Ronalds conducted experiments and formulated the ideas that eventually were published in The Fly-fisher's Entomology in 1836.

He combined his knowledge of fly fishing with his skill as an engraver and printer, to lavish his work with 20 color plates. It was the first comprehensive work related to the entomology associated with fly fishing and most fly-fishing historians credit Ronalds with setting a literature standard in 1836 that is still followed today. Describing methods, techniques and, most importantly, artificial flies, in a meaningful way for the angler and illustrating them in colour is a method of presentation that can be seen in most fly-fishing literature today.

The book was mostly about the aquatic insects—mayflies, caddisflies and stoneflies—that trout and grayling feed on and their counterpart artificial imitations. About half the book is devoted to observations of trout, their behaviour, and the methods and techniques used to catch them. Most of this information, although enhanced by Ronalds' experiences and observations, was merely an enhancement of Charles Bowlker's Art of Angling (first published in 1774 but still in print in 1836).

In Chapter IV - Of a Selection of Insects, and Their Imitations, Used in Fly Fishing - for the first time is discussed specific artificial fly imitations by name, associated with the corresponding natural insect. Organized by their month of appearance, Ronalds was the first author to begin the standardization of angler names for artificial flies. Prior to The Fly-fisher's Entomology, anglers had been given suggestions for artificial flies to be used on a particular river or at a particular time of the year, but those suggestions were never matched to specific natural insects the angler might encounter on the water. According to Ernest Schwiebert: "Ronalds is one of the major milestones in the entire literature of fly-fishing, and with his Entomology the scientific method has reached angling in full flower. Ronalds was completely original in its content and research, setting the yardstick for all subsequent discussion and illustration of aquatic fly hatches.

=== Technological improvements ===
'Nottingham' and 'Scarborough' reel designs

Modern reel design had begun in England during the latter part of the 18th century, and the predominant model in use was known as the 'Nottingham reel'. The reel was a wide drum which spooled out freely, and was ideal for allowing the bait to drift a long way out with the current. Geared multiplying reels never successfully caught on in Britain, but had more success in the United States, where similar models were modified by George Snyder of Kentucky into his bait-casting reel, the first American-made design, in 1810.

The material used for the rod itself changed from the heavy woods native to England, to lighter and more elastic varieties imported from abroad, especially from South America and the West Indies. Bamboo rods became the generally favoured option from the mid-19th century, and several strips of the material were cut from the cane, milled into shape, and then glued together to form light, strong, hexagonal rods with a solid core that were superior to anything that preceded them. George Cotton and his predecessors fished their flies with long rods and light lines, allowing the wind to do most of the work of getting the fly to the fish.

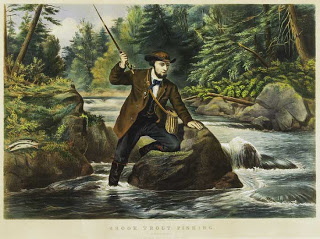
Fishing became a popular recreational activity in the 19th century. Print from Currier and Ives.

Tackle design began to improve from the 1880s. The introduction of new woods to the manufacture of fly rods made it possible to cast flies into the wind on silk lines, instead of horse hair. These lines allowed for a much greater casting distance. However, these early fly lines proved troublesome as they had to be coated with various dressings to make them float and needed to be taken off the reel and dried every four hours or so to prevent them from becoming waterlogged. Another negative consequence was that it became easy for the much longer line to get into a tangle – this was called a 'tangle' in Britain, and a 'backlash' in the US. This problem spurred the invention of the regulator to evenly spool the line out and prevent tangling.

An American, Charles F. Orvis, designed and distributed a novel reel and fly design in 1874, described by reel historian Jim Brown as the "benchmark of American reel design", and the first fully modern fly reel. The founding of The Orvis Company helped institutionalize fly fishing by supplying angling equipment via the circulation of his tackle catalogs, distributed to a small but devoted customer list.

In 1888, Foster Hardy, of Hardy Brothers Ltd., invented a new reel that used a unique ball bearing system with an adjustable click-check drag and a full-cage frame. This smoother reel was first introduced in Hardy’s 1891 catalogue, its name, the "Perfect" reflected the company's ambition to create the ideal fly reel.

Albert Illingworth, 1st Baron Illingworth, a textiles magnate, patented the modern form of fixed-spool spinning reel in 1905. When casting Illingworth's reel design, the line was drawn off the leading edge of the spool, but was restrained and rewound by a line pickup, a device which orbits around the stationary spool. Because the line did not have to pull against a rotating spool, much lighter lures could be cast than with conventional reels.

=== Expansion ===
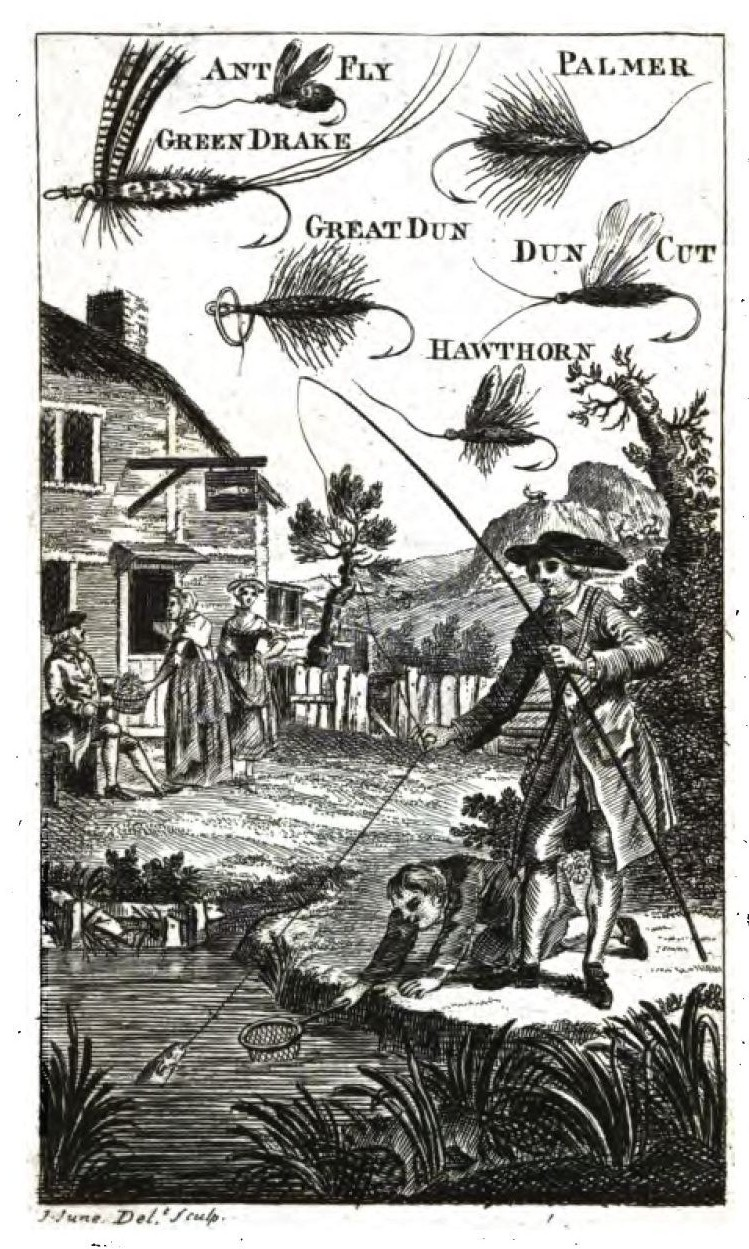
Frontispiece from The Art of Angling by Richard Brookes, 1790

By the mid to late 19th century, expanding leisure opportunities for the middle and lower classes began to have its effect on fly fishing, which steadily grew in mass appeal. The expansion of the railway network in Britain allowed the less affluent for the first time to take weekend trips to the seaside or to rivers for fishing. Richer hobbyists ventured further abroad. The large rivers of Norway replete with large stocks of salmon began to attract fishermen from England in large numbers in the middle of the century - Jones's guide to Norway, and salmon-fisher's pocket companion, published in 1848, was written by Frederic Tolfrey and was a popular guide to the country.

In southern England, dry-fly fishing acquired an elitist reputation as the only reliable method of fishing the slower, clearer rivers of the south such as the River Test and the other chalk streams concentrated in Hampshire, Surrey, Dorset and Berkshire (see Southern England Chalk Formation for the geological specifics). The weeds found in these rivers tend to grow very close to the surface, and it was necessary to develop new techniques that would keep the fly and the line on the surface of the stream. These methods became the foundation of all later dry-fly developments. F. M. Halford was a major exponent and is generally accepted as "The Father of Modern Dry Fly Fishing."

However, there was nothing to prevent the successful employment of wet flies on these chalk streams, as G. E. M. Skues proved with his nymph and wet fly techniques. To the horror of dry-fly purists, Skues later wrote two books, Minor Tactics of the Chalk Stream, and The Way of a Trout with a Fly, which greatly influenced the development of wet fly fishing. In northern England and Scotland, many anglers also favored wet-fly fishing, where the technique was more popular and widely practiced than in southern England. One of Scotland's leading proponents of the wet fly in the early-to-mid 19th century was W.C. Stewart, who published "The Practical Angler" in 1857.

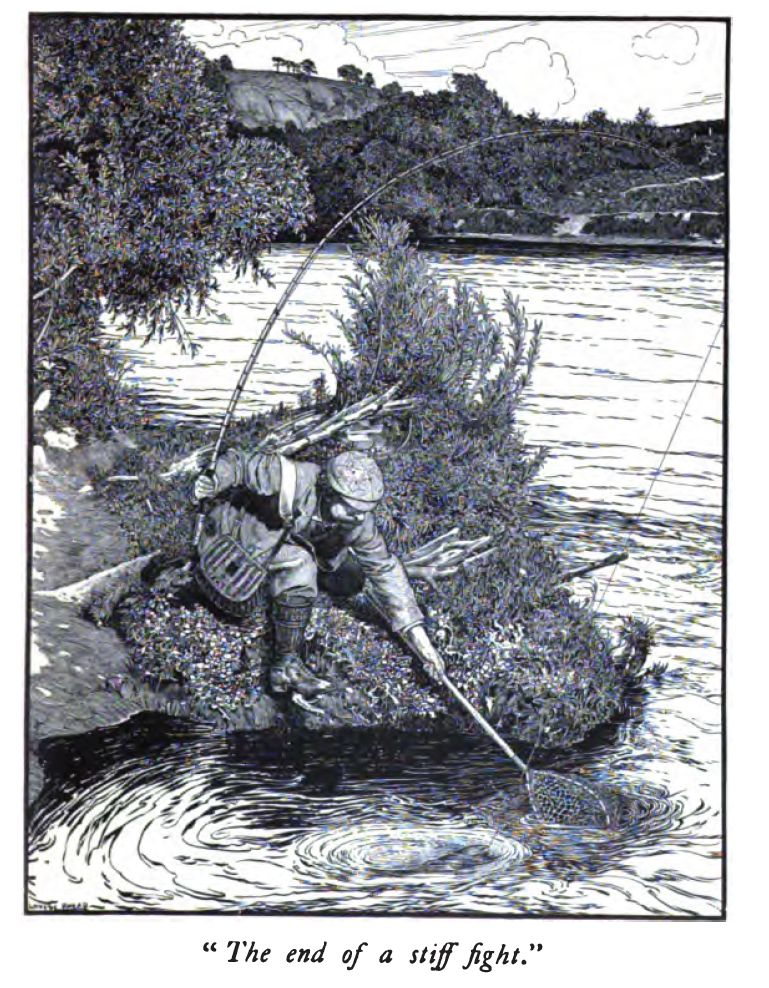
From The Speckled Brook Trout by Louis Rhead (1902)

In the United States, attitudes toward methods of fly fishing were not nearly as rigidly defined, and both dry- and wet-fly fishing were soon adapted to the conditions of the country. Fly anglers there are thought to be the first anglers to have used artificial lures for bass fishing. After pressing into service the fly patterns and tackle designed for trout and salmon to catch largemouth and smallmouth bass, they began to adapt these patterns into specific bass flies. Fly anglers seeking bass developed the spinner/fly lure and bass popper fly, which are still used today.

In the late 19th century, American anglers, such as Theodore Gordon in the Catskill Mountains of New York, began using fly tackle to fish the region's brook trout-rich streams such as the Beaverkill and Willowemoc Creek. Many of these early American fly anglers also developed new fly patterns and wrote extensively about their sport, increasing the popularity of fly fishing in the region and in the United States as a whole. Albert Bigelow Paine, a New England author, wrote about fly fishing in The Tent Dwellers, a book about a three-week trip he and a friend took to central Nova Scotia in 1908.

Participation in fly fishing peaked in the early 1920s in the eastern states of Maine and Vermont and in the Midwest in the spring creeks of Wisconsin. Along with deep sea fishing, Ernest Hemingway did much to popularize fly fishing through his works of fiction, including The Sun Also Rises.

Fly fishing in Australia took off when brown trout were first introduced by the efforts of Edward Wilson's Acclimatisation Society of Victoria with the aim to "provide for manly sport which will lead Australian youth to seek recreation on the river's bank and mountainside rather than in the Cafe and Casino. " The first successful transfer of brown trout ova (from the Itchen and Wye) was accomplished by James Arndell Youl, with a consignment aboard The Norfolk in 1864. Rainbow trout were not introduced until 1894. Alfred Ronalds' daughter Maria Shanklin established Australia's first significant fly tying business.

It was the development of inexpensive fiberglass rods, synthetic fly lines, and monofilament leaders, however, in the early 1950s, that revived the popularity of fly fishing. In recent years, interest in fly fishing has surged as baby boomers have discovered the sport. Movies such as Robert Redford's film A River Runs Through It, cable fishing shows, and the emergence of a competitive fly casting circuit have added to the sport's visibility.

== Methods ==
=== Casting ===
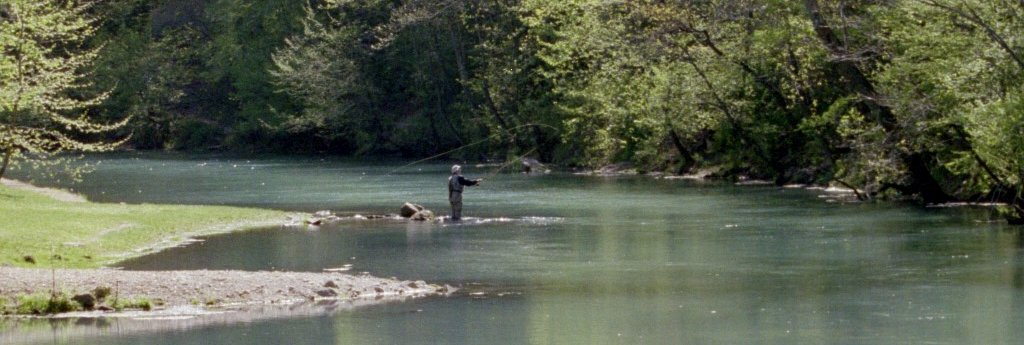
Fly casting, Maramec Spring Branch, Missouri

Unlike other casting methods, fly fishing can be thought of as a method of casting the line rather than the lure. Non-flyfishing methods rely on the lure's own weight to pull line from the reel during the forward motion of a cast. By design, a fly lure is too light and generates too much drag to be cast by its own momentum, and thus simply follows the unfurling of a properly cast fly line, which is heavier at the distal end and therefore more castable than lines used in other types of fishing. Due to the added mass (and thus often bigger diameter) of the fly line, a tapered leader line, sometimes also a secondary leader called a tippet, is used to secure the lure to the fly line.

The physics of flycasting can be described by the transfer of impulse, the product of mass and speed through the rod from base to top and from the transfer of impulse through the fly line all the way to the tip of the leader. Because both the rod and the fly line are tapered the smaller amount of mass will reach high speeds as the waves in rod and line unfurl. The waves that travel through the fly line are called loops. Determining factors in reaching the highest speeds are the basal frequency of a rod and the transfer of the speed from the tip of the rod to the fly line. At the moment the rod tip reaches its highest velocity the direction of the cast is determined.

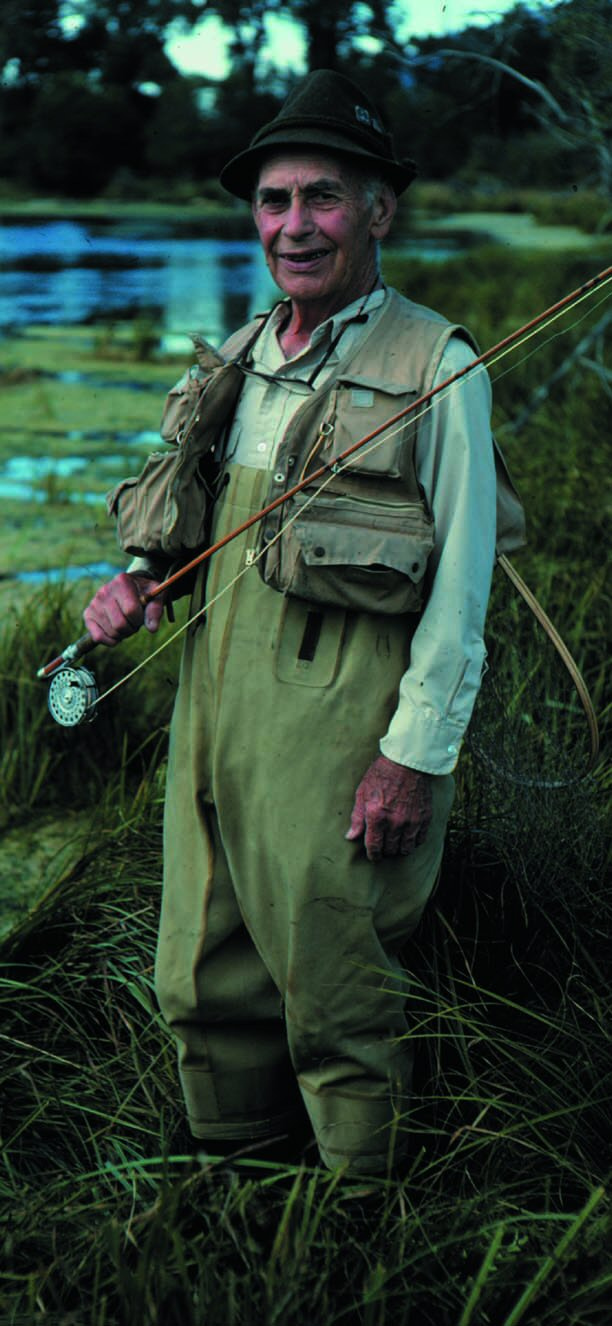
Fly angler circa 1970s

The type of cast used when fishing varies according to the conditions. The most common cast is the forward cast, where the angler whisks the fly into the air, back over the shoulder until the line is nearly straight, then forward, using primarily the forearm. The objective of this motion is to "load" (bend) the rod tip with stored energy, then transmit that energy to the line, resulting in the fly line (and the attached fly) being cast for an appreciable distance. However, just bending the rod and releasing it to jerk the fly line forward (like a bowstring or a catapult) will not propel the fly line and fly very far. More important is the movement of the rod through an arc acting as a lever, magnifying the hand movement of the caster (of about a foot) to an arc at the rod tip of several feet. Here the rod acts as a class 3 lever, where the force is applied between the fulcrum and the load. The fulcrum in the fly cast is below the caster's hand gripping the rod; the load is at the rod tip; the hand exerts the force between. The caster's "stroke" backwards and forwards, for the backcast and the forward cast, operates the rod. Casting without landing the fly on the water is known as 'false casting', and may be used to pay out line, to dry a soaked fly, or to reposition a cast. Other casts are the roll cast, the single- or double-haul, the tuck cast, and the side- or curve-cast.

Dropping the fly onto the water and its subsequent movement on or beneath the surface is one of fly fishing's most difficult aspects; the angler is attempting to cast in such a way that the line lands smoothly on the water and the fly appears as natural as possible. At a certain point, if a fish does not strike, depending upon the action of the fly in the wind or current, the angler picks up the line to make another presentation. On the other hand, if a fish strikes, the angler pulls in line while raising the rod tip. This "sets" the hook in the fish's mouth. The fish is played either by hand, where the angler continues to hold the fly line in one hand to control the tension applied to the fish, or by reeling up any slack in the line and then using the hand to act as a drag on the reel. Most modern fly reels have an adjustable, mechanical drag system to control line tension during a fish's run.

Beginners tend to point with the rod to where they want to throw, but the movement of the hand has to be a controlled speed-up and then come to an abrupt stop. The rod will then start to unfurl and the tip of the rod will reach a high speed in the required direction. The high speed of the rod tip toward the target gives the impulse to make the cast, the abrupt stop and retreat of the rod tip is essential for the formation of a loop. Experienced fishermen also improve the speed of the line leaving the rod tip by a technique called hauling, applying a quick fast pull with the hand holding the line. At the end of the cast when the line is stretched the line as a whole will still have speed and the fisherman can let some extra line through their fingers making a false throw, either forward or backward or to finish the cast and start fishing.

There are a great number of special casts meant to evade problems like trees behind the angler (roll cast), the pulling of the line on the fly by the action of the stream, or to make the fly land more softly.

=== Spey casting ===
Spey casting is a casting technique used in fly fishing. Spey casting requires a longer, heavier two-handed fly rod, referred to as a "Spey rod". Spey casting is essentially a large roll cast, developed on the Scottish River Spey where high banks do not allow space for the usual back cast.

Spey casting is used for fishing large rivers for salmon and large trout such as steelhead and sea trout. Spey technique is also used in saltwater surf casting. All of these situations require the angler to cast larger flies long distances. The two-handed Spey technique allows more powerful casts and avoids obstacles on the shore by keeping most of the line in front of the angler.

=== Fly fishing for trout ===
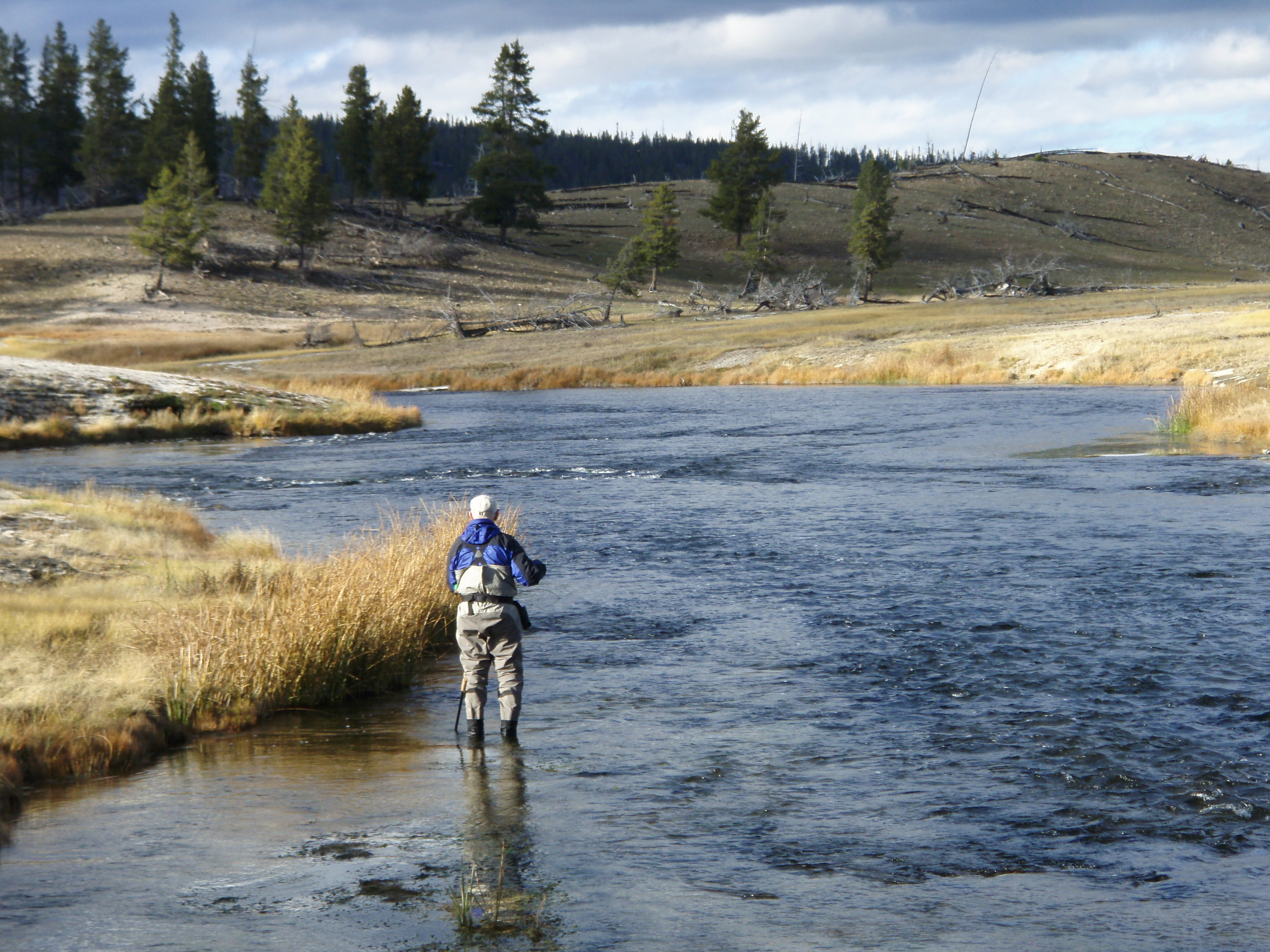
Fly angler on the Firehole River, USA

Fly fishing for trout is a very popular sport, which can be done using any of the various methods and any of the general types of flies. Many of the techniques and presentations of fly fishing were first developed in fishing for trout. There is a misconception that all fly fishing for trout is done on the surface of the water with "dry flies." In most places, especially heavily fished trout areas, success usually comes from fly fishing using flies called "nymphs" that are designed to drift close to the riverbed, also called "nymphing". A trout feeds below the water's surface nearly 90 percent of the time. Trout usually only come to the surface when there is a large bug hatch (when aquatic insects grow wings and leave the water to mate and lay eggs). There are exceptions to this rule, however, particularly during the summer months and on smaller mountain streams, when trout often feed on terrestrial insects such as ants, beetles and grasshoppers.

== Techniques ==
=== Fishing in cold water ===
In order to deceive wary trout, or to reach deep runs where salmon may lie, the fly angler often needs to wade to the right casting position. He therefore requires sure footing and insulation from cold water, both provided by hip boots or chest-high waders. The latter are of two main types, one-piece "boot foot" waders and "stocking foot" waders, which require external boots.

Formerly of latex rubber, "stocking foot" waders are now made of neoprene, usually 3 mm thick, which provide additional warmth. In the mid-20th century, American anglers developed felt boot soles for a better grip in rocky rivers: but felt is now prohibited in some US states, as a vector of fish and plant diseases that damage sport fisheries. Manufacturers now offer wading boots with special rubber treads or metal studs. Breathable Gore-Tex waders provide ventilation when hiking along the water, but do not provide flotation in the event of slipping or falling into deep water. In deep water streams, an inflatable personal flotation device (PFD), or a Type III Kayak fishing vest, adds a degree of safety.

Some "catch and release" anglers flatten the barb of their hook. Such "barbless hooks" are much easier to remove from the fish (and from the angler, in the event of mishap). Many rivers with special regulations mandate that fishermen use barbless hooks in an effort to conserve a healthy fish population.

=== Dry fly trout fishing ===
Dry fly fishing is done with line and flies that float, joined by a leader, usually made of fine polyamide monofilament line. The tapered leader is 3 to 5 meters long, thus nearly invisible where the fly is knotted, and the angler can replace the last meter of nylon as required. Unlike sinking fly (nymph) fishing, the "take" on dry flies is visible, explosive and exciting. While trout typically consume about 90% of their diet from below-water sources, the 10% of surface-level consumption by trout is more than enough to keep most anglers busy. Additionally, beginning fly anglers generally prefer dry fly fishing because of the relative ease of detecting a strike and the instant gratification of seeing a trout strike their fly. Nymph fishing may be more productive, but dry fly anglers soon become addicted to the surface strike.

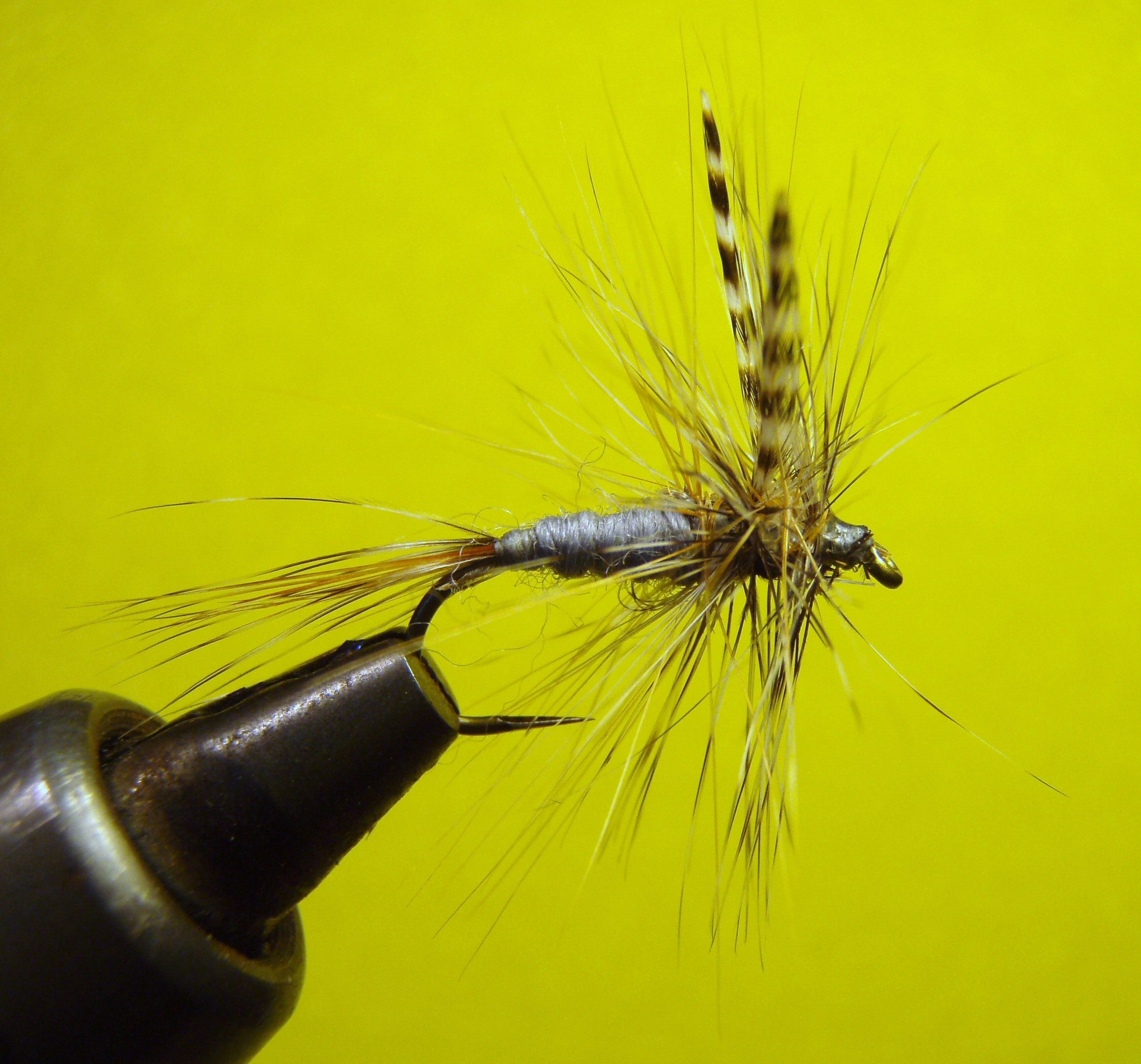
An Adams dry fly

Dry flies may be "attractors", such as the Royal Wulff, or "natural imitators", such as the elk hair caddis, a caddisfly imitation A beginner may wish to begin with a fly that is easy to see such as a Royal Wulff attractor or a mayfly imitation such as a parachute adams. "Parachute"-style flies, such as the Parachute Adams, have the added benefit of making the fly very visible from the surface. Being able to see the fly is especially helpful to the beginner. The fly should land softly, as if dropped onto the water, with the leader fully extended from the fly line. Due to rivers having faster and slower currents often running side by side, the fly can over take or be overtaken by the line, thus disturbing the fly's drift. Mending is a technique whereby one lifts and moves the part of the line that requires re-aligning with the fly's drift, thus extending the drag free drift. The mend can be upstream or down stream depending on the currents carrying the line or fly. To be effective, any mending of the fly line should not disturb the natural drift of the fly. Learning to mend is often much easier if the angler can see the fly.

Once a fish has been caught and landed, the fly may no longer float well. A fly can sometimes be dried and made to float again by "false" casting, casting the fly back and forth in the air. In some cases, the fly can be dried with a small piece of reusable absorbent towel, an amadou patch or chamois and after drying placed and shaken in a container full of fly "dressing"; a hydrophobic solution. A popular solution to a dry fly which refuses to float is simply to replace it with another, similar or identical fly until the original can fully dry, rotating through a set of flies.

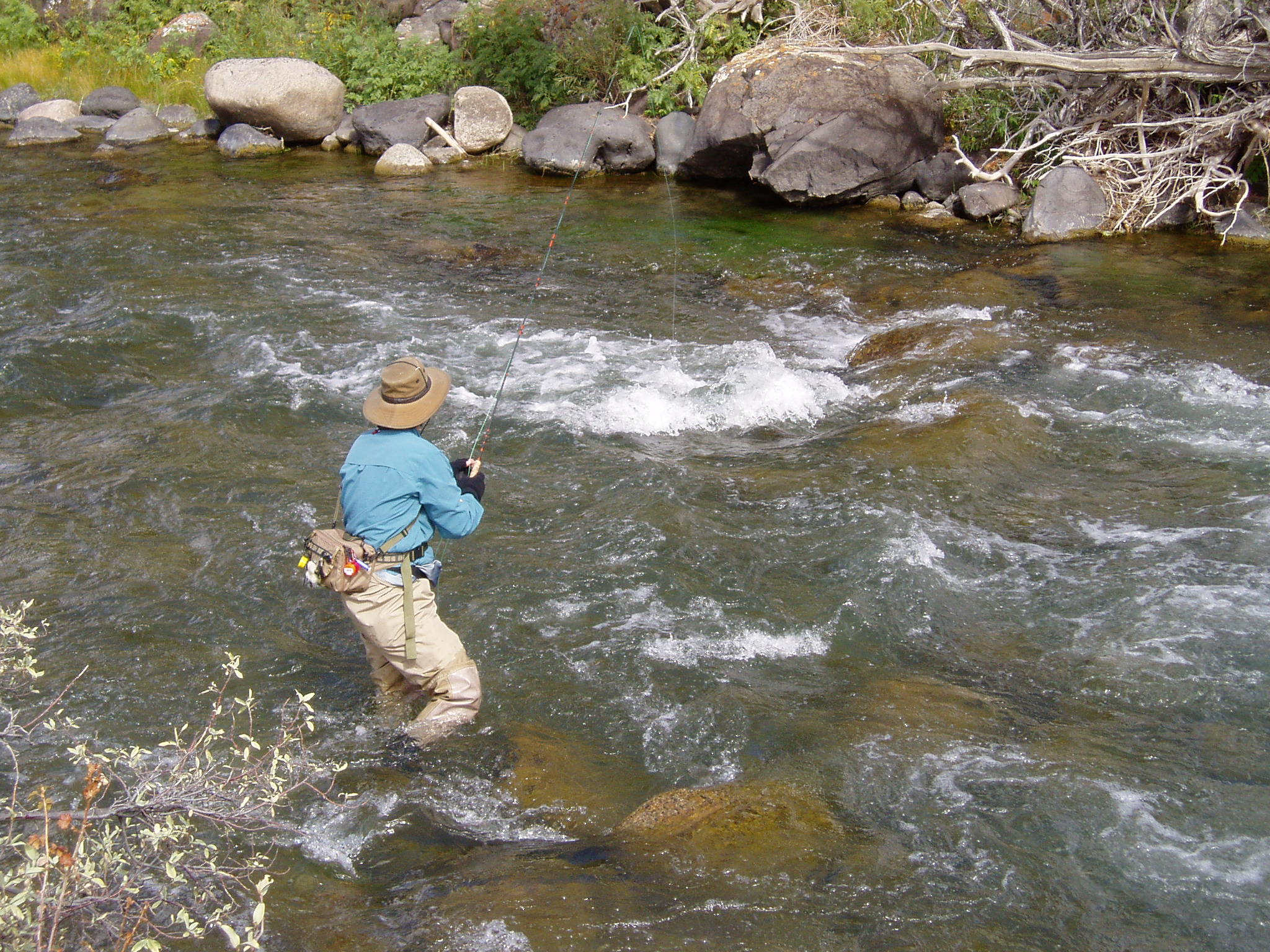
Fly fishing on the Gardner River in Yellowstone National Park, USA

Dry fly fishing on small, clear-water streams can be especially productive if the angler stays as low to the ground and as far from the bank as possible, moving upstream with stealth. Trout tend to face upstream and most of their food is carried to them on the current. For this reason, the fish's attention is normally focused into the current; most anglers move and fish "into the current", fishing from a position downstream of the fish's suspected lie. Trout tend to strike their food at current "edges", where faster- and slower-moving waters mix. Obstructions to the stream flow, such as large rocks or nearby pools, provide a "low energy" environment where fish sit and wait for food without expending much energy. Casting upstream to the "edge" of the slower water, the angler can see the fly land and drift slowly back downstream. The challenge in stream fishing is placing the fly with deadly accuracy, within inches of a protective rock for instance, not long range casting. Done properly, the fly seems to be just floating along in the current with a "perfect drift" as if not connected to the fly line. The angler must remain vigilant for the "take" in order to be ready to raise the rod tip and set the hook.

=== Nymphing for trout ===
Trout tend mostly to feed underwater. When fishing deeper waters such as rivers or lakes, putting a fly down to the trout may be more successful than fishing on the surface, especially in the absence of any surface insect activity or hatch. The nymph itself can be weighted, as is the popular bead headed hare's ear nymph or bead headed pheasant tail nymph. Alternatively, the angler can use an attractor pattern such as a prince nymph. Weights can be added to the leader. Probably the best weight to use is twist on lead or other metal strips because it has a much less detrimental effect on the casting ability. A sinking tip fly line can also serve to sink the fly. A common nymphing and general overall fly fishing technique that even beginners can master is a "dead drift" or tight line fishing technique, casting directly across the river, letting the fly line drift downriver while keeping any slack out of the line. If the Nymph is drifting too fast, the fisherman should perform an upstream mend. If the nymph is drifting too slowly, the fisherman should mend downstream. A beginner need simply to point the rod at the fly, lifting the rod in the event of a strike. This is a "downstream technique" where the angler moves in a downstream direction. More advanced techniques make use of a highly visible strike indicator attached to the leader above the sinking fly.

In New Zealand, nymphing has become the dominant form of fishing in rivers such as the Tongariro River. A technique involving a high visibility indicator, and 2 nymphs tied in short succession (a weighted nymph and a 2nd often un-weighted nymph) means the chances of getting a fly into deeper water with a fly that still moves naturally increases.

It is also possible to use standard sinking fly lines, especially if the current is strong and if it is difficult to get down to the correct level to catch the trout.

=== Still water trout fishing ===
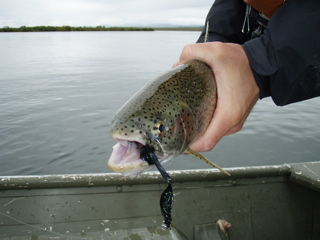
A rainbow trout taken on an articulated leech pattern, Bristol Bay Region, Alaska

Fishing for trout in lakes requires different tactics. A canoe, pontoon boat or a float tube allows an angler to cover a lot more water than waders. Trout may congregate in cooler water near an inflowing stream or an underwater spring and may be lured to bite on a streamer fly. An often successful tactic is to pull a streamer such as a woolly bugger using clear sinking line, behind the watercraft. The somewhat erratic motion of the oars or fins tends to give the streamer an enticing action. Trout also tend to "cruise" transitional areas (e.g. dropoffs, weed bed edges, subsurface river flow at inlets, etc.) Watching for cruising trout and casting well ahead of any visible fish is often successful.

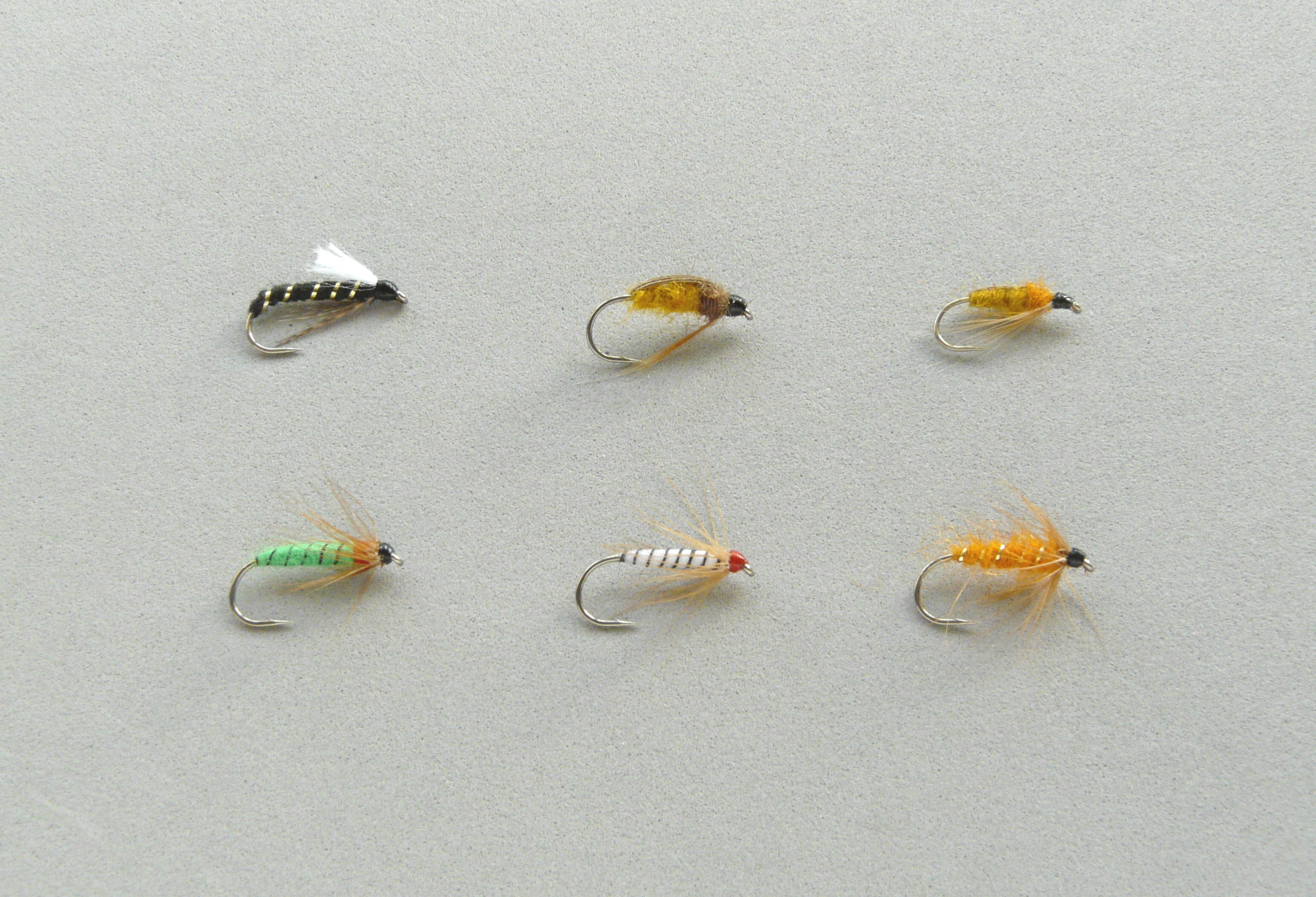
Reservoir nymph patterns devised by Dr Bell of Wrington

==== The legacy of Dr Howard Alexander Bell (1888-1974) ====
Although he never wrote a word about fishing and shunned publicity, Dr Bell of Blagdon had the greatest formative influence of any man on the development of reservoir fishing in the first half of this century. In those days Blagdon was fished with spinners or with traditional sea-trout and low-water salmon flies. Fly fishing was carried out from boats and bank during the evening rise. Daytime fishing with the fly was thought to be of little use. Bell had read Skues and, following his example, used a marrow spoon to spoon out the trout he caught (one of his friends said, ‘He would spoon out his grandmother if he thought there was anything in her’). The stomach contents of the Blagdon trout were a revelation. There was nothing there but small larvae and pupae, among them the pupae of the famous black midge. Dr Bell tied artificials to represent the insects that he found in the Blagdon trout, including bloodworms, midge and sedge pupae and beetles. His flies were quite small, 10s, 12s and sometimes 14s. He might have a Worm Fly on a single hook on the point, a Grenadier (caddis pupa) on the middle dropper and a Buzzer (midge pupa) on the top. All his dressings were plain and simple. Nevertheless, in the 1920s and 30s he set the scene and pointed the way in which imitative patterns of underwater insects were to develop as one of the major techniques of reservoir trout fishing.

=== Playing trout ===
Once hooked, a small trout can be easily retrieved "on the reel" or by simply pulling in the fly line with the reel hand while pinching the line between the rod handle and the index finger of the rod hand. It is important to keep the rod tip high, allowing the bend of the rod to absorb the force of the fish's struggles against the line. Larger trout will often take line in powerful runs before they can be landed. Unlike spin fishing where the line is already on the reel, playing a large fish with fly line and a fly reel can present a special challenge. Usually, when a fish is hooked, there will be extra fly line coiled between the reel and the index finger of the rod hand. The challenge is to reel up the loose fly line onto the reel without breaking off a large fish (or getting the line wrapped up around the rod handle, one's foot, a stick or anything else in the way). With experience, really large trout can be put on the reel simply by applying light pressure on the outgoing line using the fisher's fingers. Once the extra line is on the reel, an angler can use the reel's drag system to tire the fish. It is important to use heavier tippet material if it will not spook the fish. The reason why this is important is an exhausted fish can easily die if released too soon. Heavier tippet material enables the angler to land the fish while not over exhausting it.

=== Saltwater fly fishing ===
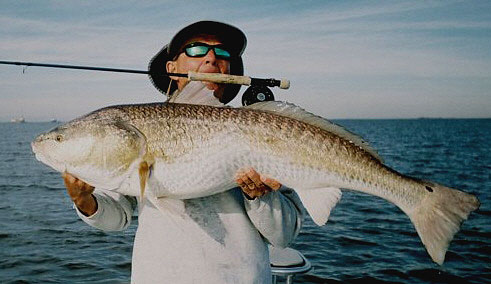
A red drum caught on a fly rod, Louisiana, USA

Saltwater fly fishing is typically done with heavier tackle than that which is used for freshwater trout fishing, both to handle the larger, more powerful fish, and to accommodate the casting of larger and heavier flies. Saltwater fly fishing typically employs the use of wet flies resembling baitfish, crabs, shrimp and other forage. However, saltwater fish can also be caught with poppers and other surface lure similar to those used for freshwater bass fishing, though much larger. Saltwater species sought and caught with fly tackle include: bonefish, redfish or red drum, permit, snook, spotted sea trout, tuna, dorado (mahi-mahi), sailfish, tarpon, striped bass, salmon, giant trevally and marlin. Offshore saltwater species are usually attracted to the fly by "chumming" with small baitfish, or "teasing" the fish to the boat by trolling a large hookless lure (Billfish are most often caught using this latter method).

Many saltwater species, particularly large, fast and powerful fish, are not easily slowed down by "palming" the hand on the reel. Instead, a purpose-made saltwater reel for these species must have a powerful drag system. Furthermore, saltwater reels purpose-made for larger fish must be larger, heavier, and corrosion-resistant; a typical high-quality saltwater reel costs US$500.00 or more. Corrosion-resistant equipment is key to durability in all types of saltwater fishing, regardless of the size and power of the target species.

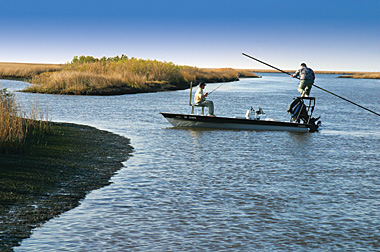
Saltwater Fly Fishing in Louisiana

Saltwater fly fishing is most often done from a boat, either a shallow draft flats boat is used to pursue species such as bonefish, redfish, permit and tarpon in shallow waters, or from larger offshore boats for pursuing sailfish, tuna, dorado, marlin and other pelagics and may be done from shore, such as wading flats for bonefish or redfish or surf fishing for striped bass and other assorted fish. Typically, most trout fly fisherman need to practice new skills to catch saltwater fish on a fly rod. Ocean fish are usually harder to catch. They can be extremely spooky, and much larger. Trout fisherman need to practice with at least an 8 weight fly rod and accurately cast the line 30–90 feet if they are going to have success—particularly in the flat areas fishing for bonefish, redfish, permit, tarpon, jacks and more.

Hooks for saltwater flies must also be extremely durable and corrosion resistant. Most saltwater hooks are made of stainless steel, but the strongest (though less corrosion resistant) hooks are of high-carbon steel. Typically, these hooks vary from size #8 to #2 for bonefish and smaller nearshore species, to size #3/0 to #5/0 for the larger offshore species.

== Tackle ==
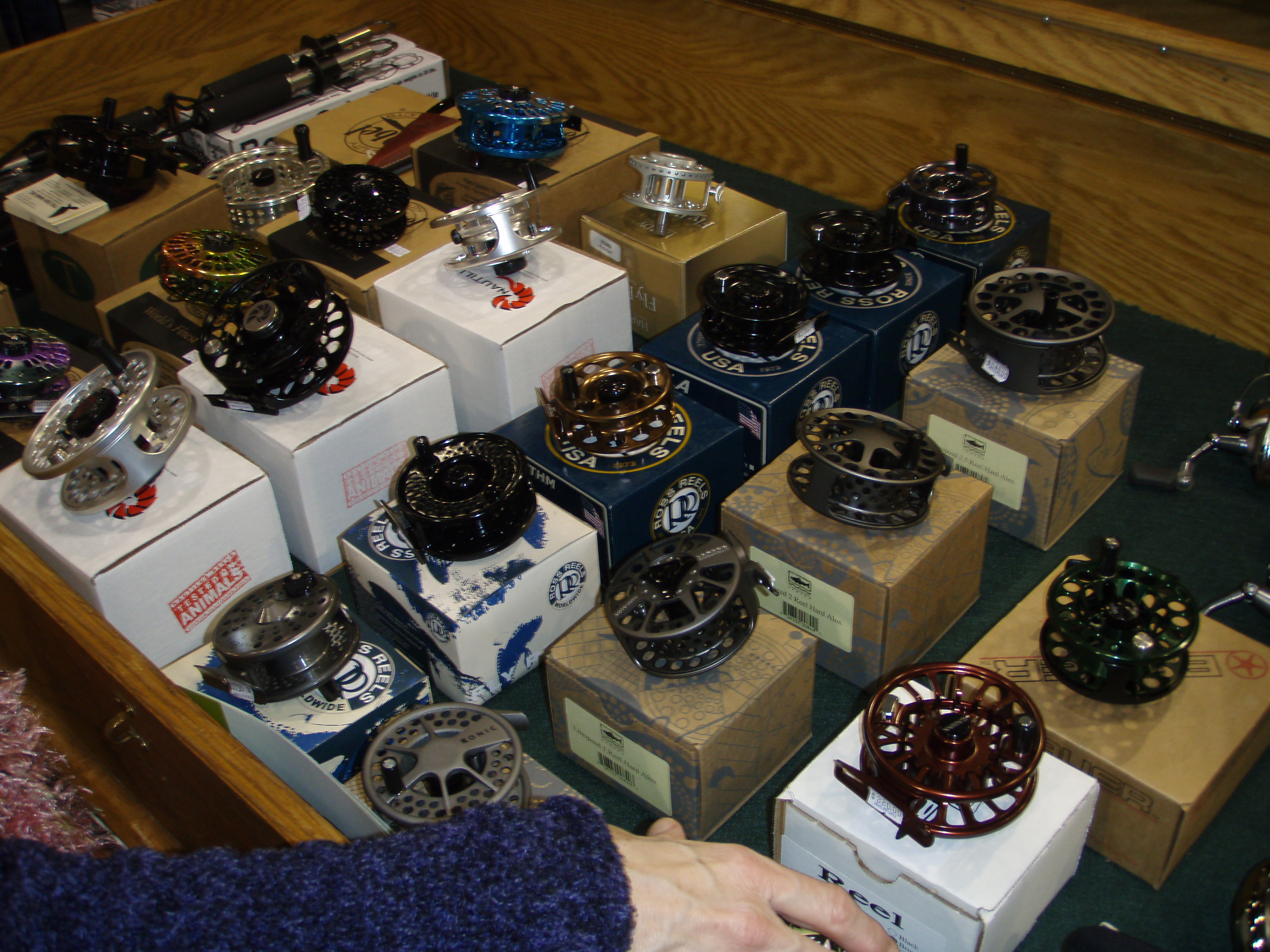
A variety of fly reels on display at a fly fishing show

Fly fishing tackle comprises the fishing tackle or equipment typically used by fly anglers. Fly fishing tackle includes:

- A wide variety of fly rods of different weights, lengths and material are used to present artificial flies to target species of fish as well as fight and land fish being caught.
- A wide variety of fly reels are used to store fly line and provide a braking mechanism (drag) for fighting heavy or fast moving fish.
- A wide variety of general use and specialized fly lines are used to cast artificial flies under a wide variety of fresh and saltwater conditions.
- Terminal tackle is used to connect the artificial fly to the fly line and allow the appropriate presentation of the fly to the fish.
- There are a wide variety of accessories—tools, gadgets, clothing and apparel used by the fly angler for maintenance and preparation of tackle, dealing the fish being caught as well as personal comfort and safety while fly fishing. Includes fly boxes used to store and carry artificial flies.

Fly rods are typically between 1.8 m (6 ft) long in freshwater fishing and up to 4.5 m (15 ft) long for two-handed fishing for salmon or steelhead, or in tenkara fishing in small streams. The average rod for fresh and saltwater is around 9 feet (2.7 m) in length and weighs from 3 –5 ounces, though a recent trend has been to lighter, shorter rods for fishing smaller streams. Another trend is to longer rods for small streams. The choice of rod lengths and line weights used varies according to local conditions, types of flies being cast, and/or personal preference.

When actively fishing, the angler may want to keep the fly line lightly pressed against the rod handle with the index finger of the casting arm. The free arm is used to pull line from the reel or to retrieve line from the water. If a fish strikes, the angler can pinch the line with the index finger against the rod handle and lift the rod tip, setting the hook.

== Artificial flies ==
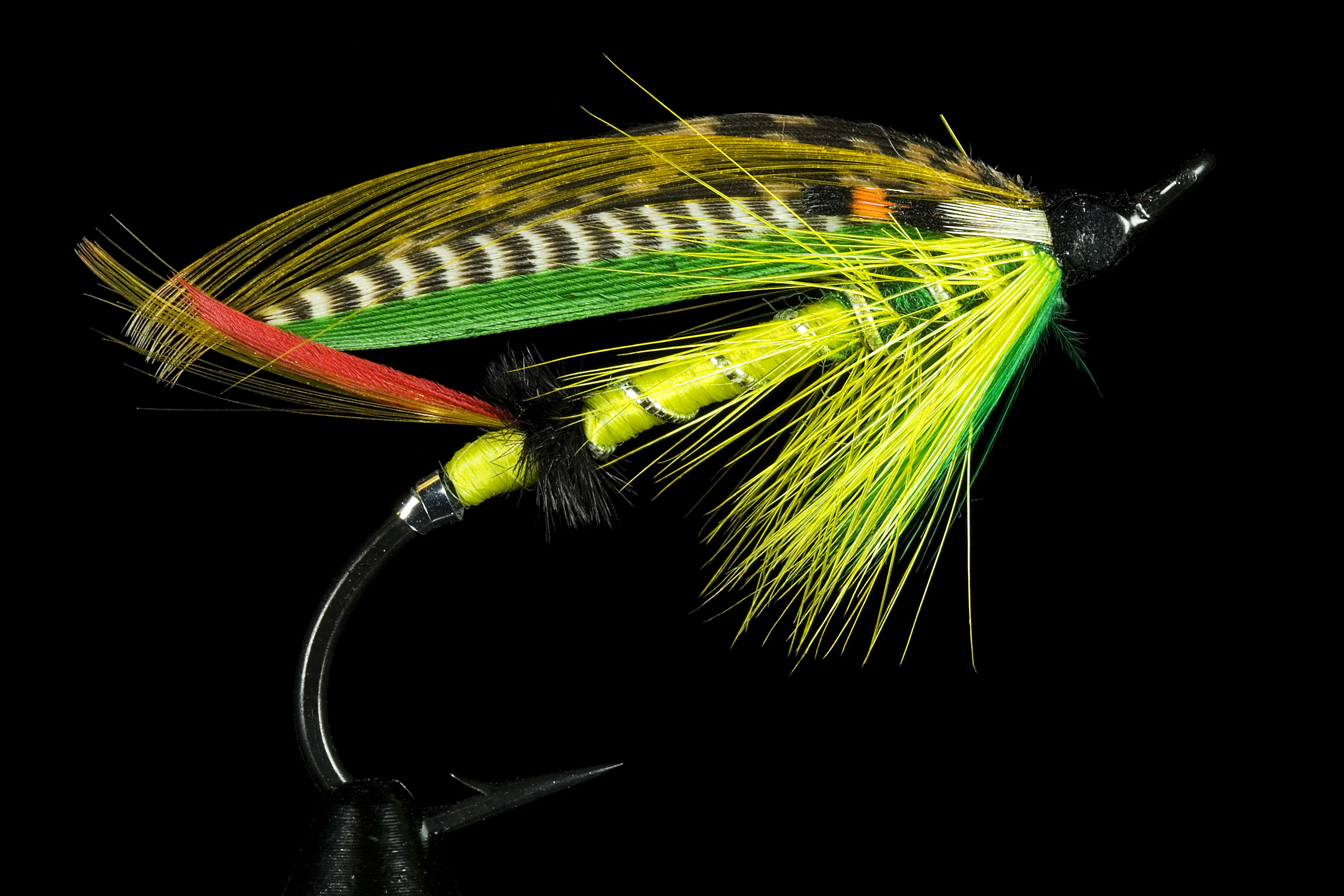
Green Highlander, a classic salmon fly

In broadest terms, flies are categorised as either imitative or attractive. Imitative flies resemble natural food items. Attractive flies trigger instinctive strikes by employing a range of characteristics that do not necessarily mimic prey items. Flies can be fished floating on the surface (dry flies), partially submerged (emergers), or below the surface (nymphs, streamers, and wet flies). A dry fly is typically thought to represent an insect landing on, falling on (terrestrials), or emerging from, the water's surface as might a grasshopper, dragonfly, mayfly, ant, beetle, stonefly or caddisfly. Other surface flies include poppers and hair bugs that might resemble mice, frogs, etc. Sub-surface flies are designed to resemble a wide variety of prey including aquatic insect larvae, nymphs and pupae, baitfish, crayfish, leeches, worms, etc. Wet flies, known as streamers, are generally thought to imitate minnows, leeches or scuds. Throughout history, artificial flies constructed of furs, feathers, and threads bound on a hook have been created by anglers to imitate fish prey. Most early examples of artificial flies imitated common aquatic insects and baitfish. Today, artificial flies are tied with a wide variety of natural and synthetic materials (like mylar and rubber) to represent all manner of potential freshwater and saltwater fish prey to include aquatic and terrestrial insects, crustaceans, worms, baitfish, vegetation, flesh, spawn, small reptiles, amphibians, mammals and birds, etc.

== Knots ==
A few knots have become more or less standard for attaching the various parts of the fly lines and backing, etc., together. A detailed discussion of most of these knots is available in any good book on fly fishing, and several studies have been done evaluating their performance. Some of the knots that are in most every fly angler's arsenal are: the improved clinch knot which is commonly used to attach the fly to the leader, the overhand slip knot or arbor knot which is used to attach the backing to the spool, the albright knot which can be used to attach the fly line to the backing. A loop can also be put in fly line backing using a bimini twist. Often, a loop is added to the business end of the fly line to facilitate the connection to the leader. This loop may take one of several forms. It may be formed by creating a loop in the end of the fly line itself or by adding a braided loop or a loop of monofilament nylon (as in Gray's Loop). Alternatively, a single length of monofilament nylon, or fluorocarbon, may be tied to the end of the fly line using a nail or tube knot or a needle knot. A loop can then be tied at the end of this monofilament butt length or butt section using a double surgeon's knot or a perfection loop, to which the tapered or untapered leader, also looped using a double surgeon's knot or a perfection loop, may in turn be connected via a loop to loop connection. The use of loop to loop connections between the fly line and the leader provides a quick and convenient way to change or replace a tapered leader. Many commercially produced tapered leaders come with a pre-tied loop connection.

Some traditionalists create their own tapered leaders using progressively smaller-diameter lengths of monofilament line tied together with the blood, barrel knot or "surgeons knot".

== See also ==
- American Angler
- Trout memo — a 1939 British Intelligence document comparing deception of an enemy in wartime with fly fishing
