= Woolly Bugger =

Artificial fly fishing lure

- Artificial fly
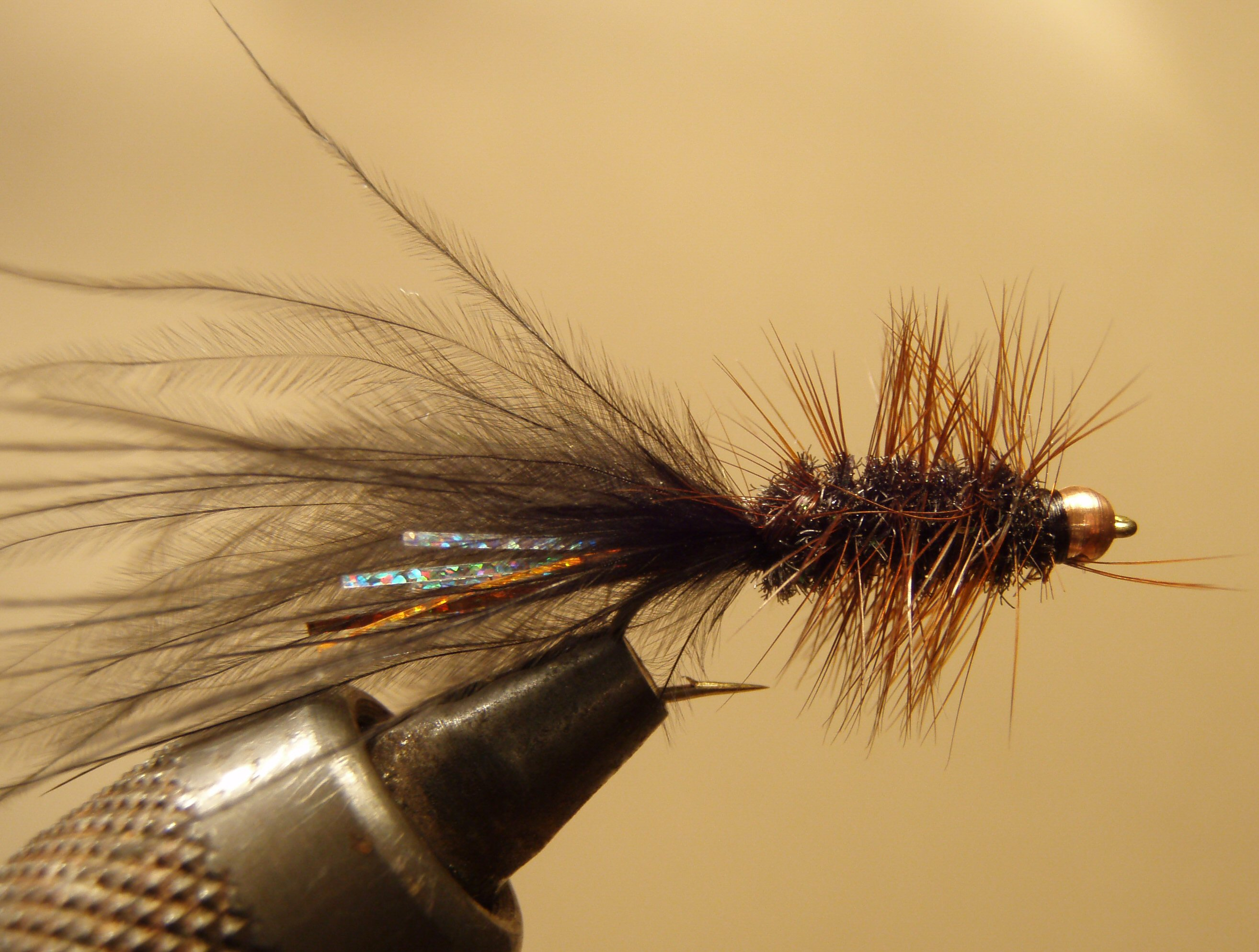
- #8 black and brown beadhead Woolly Bugger
- Type: Streamer
- Imitates: Large nymphs, baitfish, leech, drowning terrestrial insects, clamworms, crayfish, shrimp or crabs

History
- Creator: Russell Blessing
- Created: 1967

Materials
- Typical sizes: 2–12
- Typical hooks: TMC 200R

Reference(s)
- Pattern references: Woolly Wisdom (1999), Soucie

The Woolly Bugger is an artificial fly commonly categorized as a wet fly or streamer and is fished under the water surface. It is a popular and widely used pattern for both freshwater and saltwater game fish and is generally listed as one of the top patterns to have in any fly box. John Gierach, a noted fly fishing writer, discussed the Woolly Bugger first in his chapter on streamers in Good Flies. Woolly Buggers are typically fished in streams, rivers, ponds, lakes, and tidal flats. Today, Woolly Buggers are tied in a wide variety of styles and colors to imitate a wide range of game fish prey.

The Woolly Bugger is so effective, it should be banned from some watersheds. I suspect its effectiveness is due to its resemblance to so many edible creatures in the water—nymphs, leeches, salamanders, or even small sculpins. Its tail undulating behind a fiber, bubble-filled body is just too much for most fish to resist. It just looks like a meal!

— Bill Hunter, The Professionals' Favorite Flies

== Origin ==
Although the original Woolly Bugger pattern was believed to have been created by Pennsylvania fly tyer Russell Blessing as early as 1967 to resemble a hellgrammite, or dobsonfly nymph, its precise origin is unknown, but is clearly an evolution of the Woolly Worm fly, which itself is a variation—intentional or not—of the British palmer fly, which dates back to Walton and beyond.

== Imitates ==
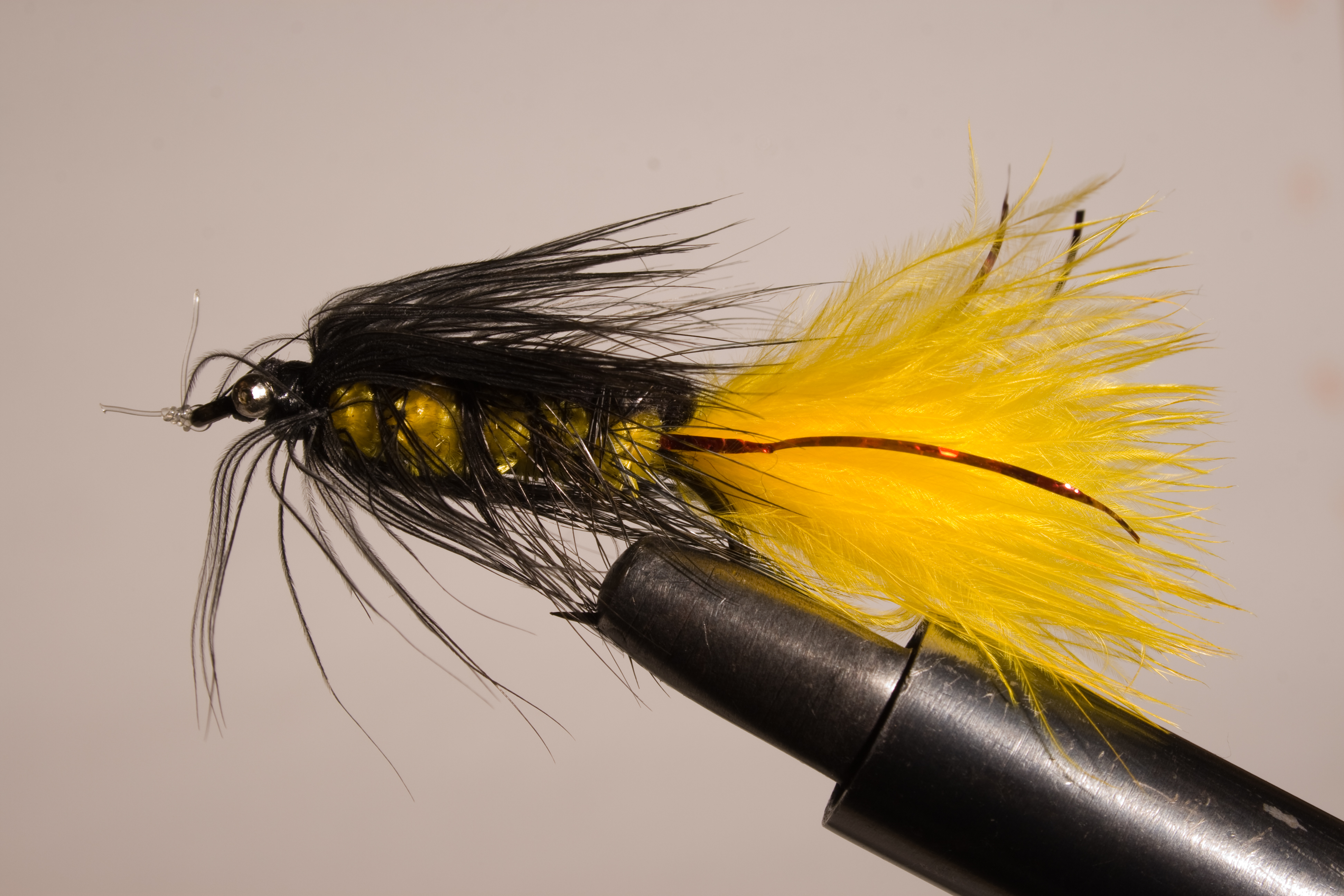

The Woolly Bugger, depending the specific material used and how it is fished can be assumed to resemble large nymphs, baitfish, leech, drowning terrestrial insects, clamworms, crayfish, shrimp or crabs.

== Materials ==
The Woolly Bugger fly is constructed with a marabou tail (with or without some sort of flashy material in the tail), a chenille or fur body, and a hackle palmered from the tail to the head of the fly. Tying the pattern with a rib of fine copper wire helps protect the palmer hackle. The underbody may be weighted with lead or tungsten wire. Popular colors are olive, brown, and black for freshwater use. Brighter colors and combinations of colors are especially popular for steelhead, salmon and saltwater use.

== Variations and sizes ==
Woolly Bugger flies are typically tied on number 2 to 14 long or extra long hooks. Variations include Woolly Buggers weighted with brass or tungsten beads, brass or tungsten cones, brass, lead or tungsten dumbbell eyes.

Woolly Bugger Gallery
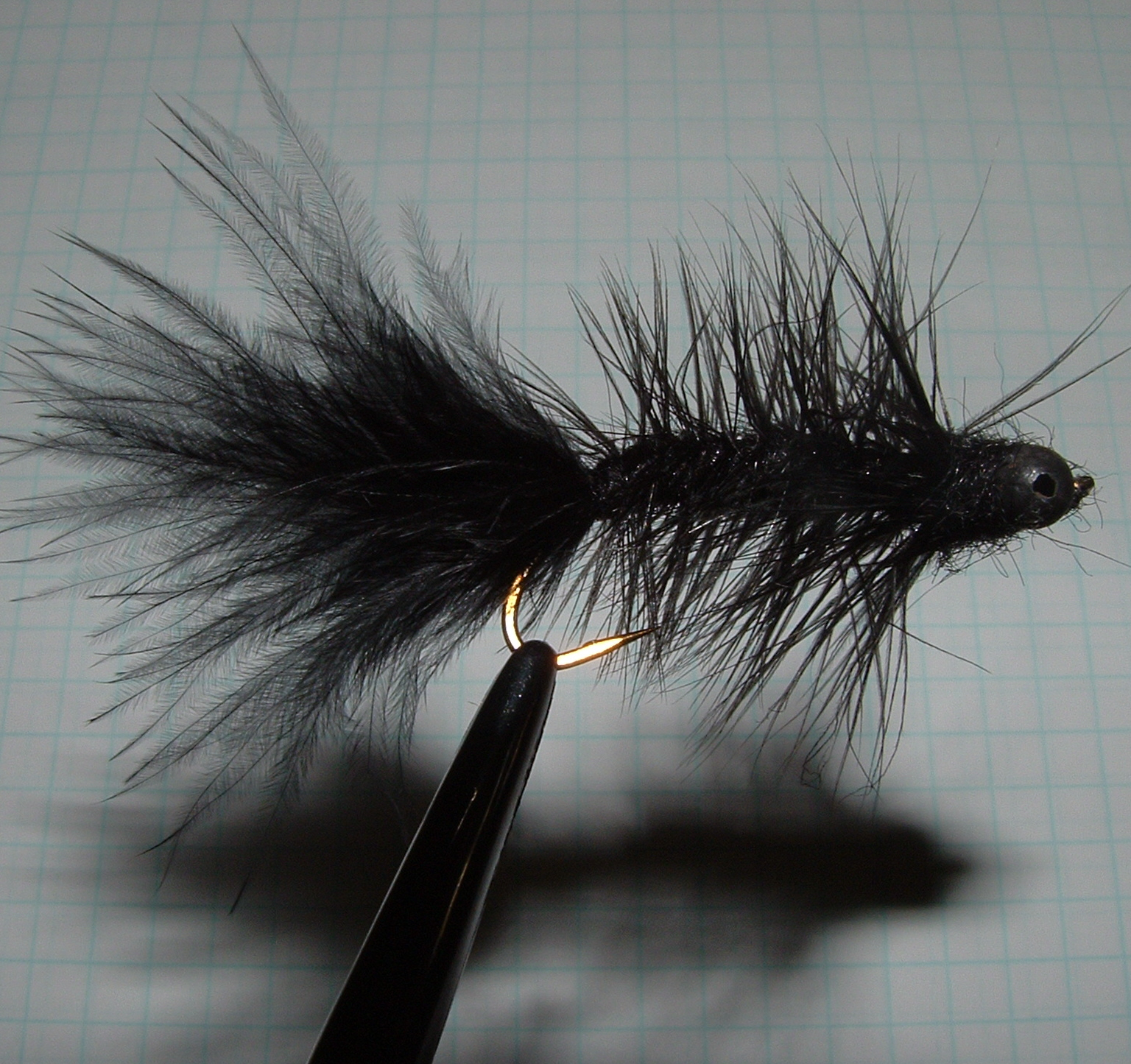
Bead-Eyed Bugger

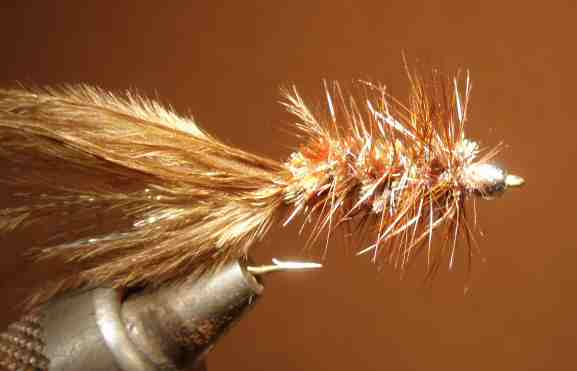
#6 Brown Beadhead Woolly Bugger

Gierach style: Daiichi 1870 hook

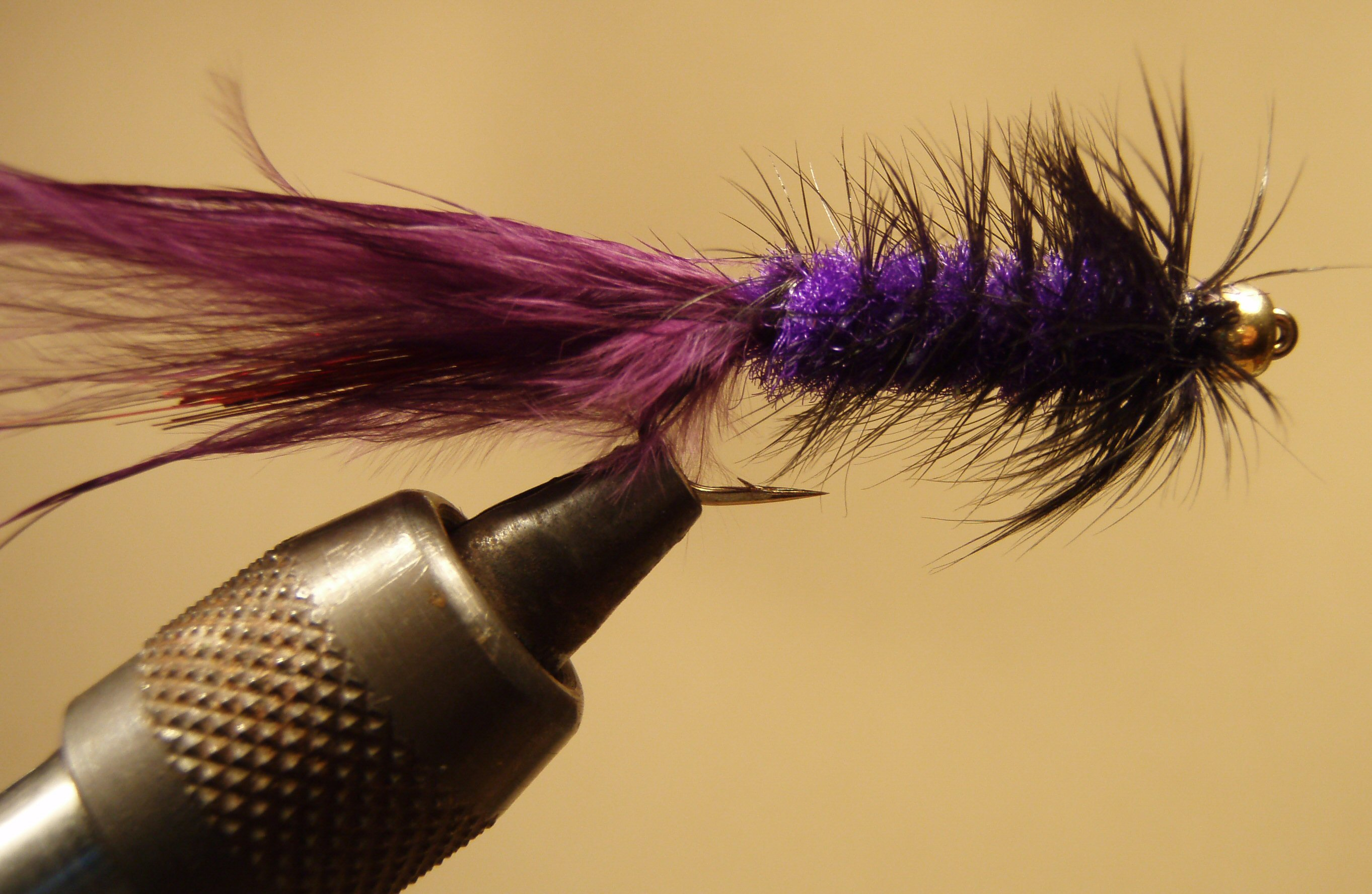
#6 Purple and Black Beadhead Woolly Bugger

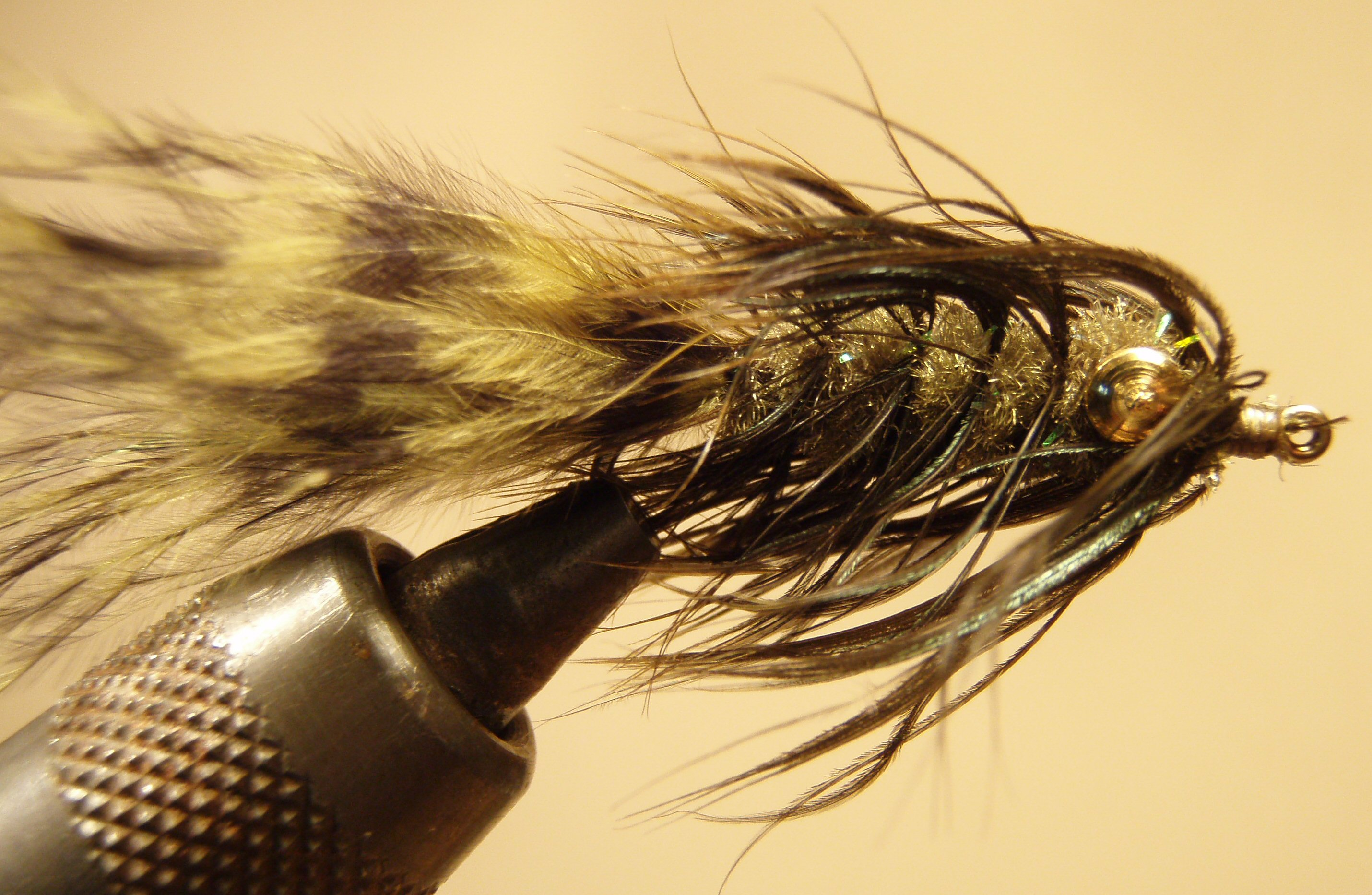
#6 Olive Dumbbell Eyed Woolly Bugger

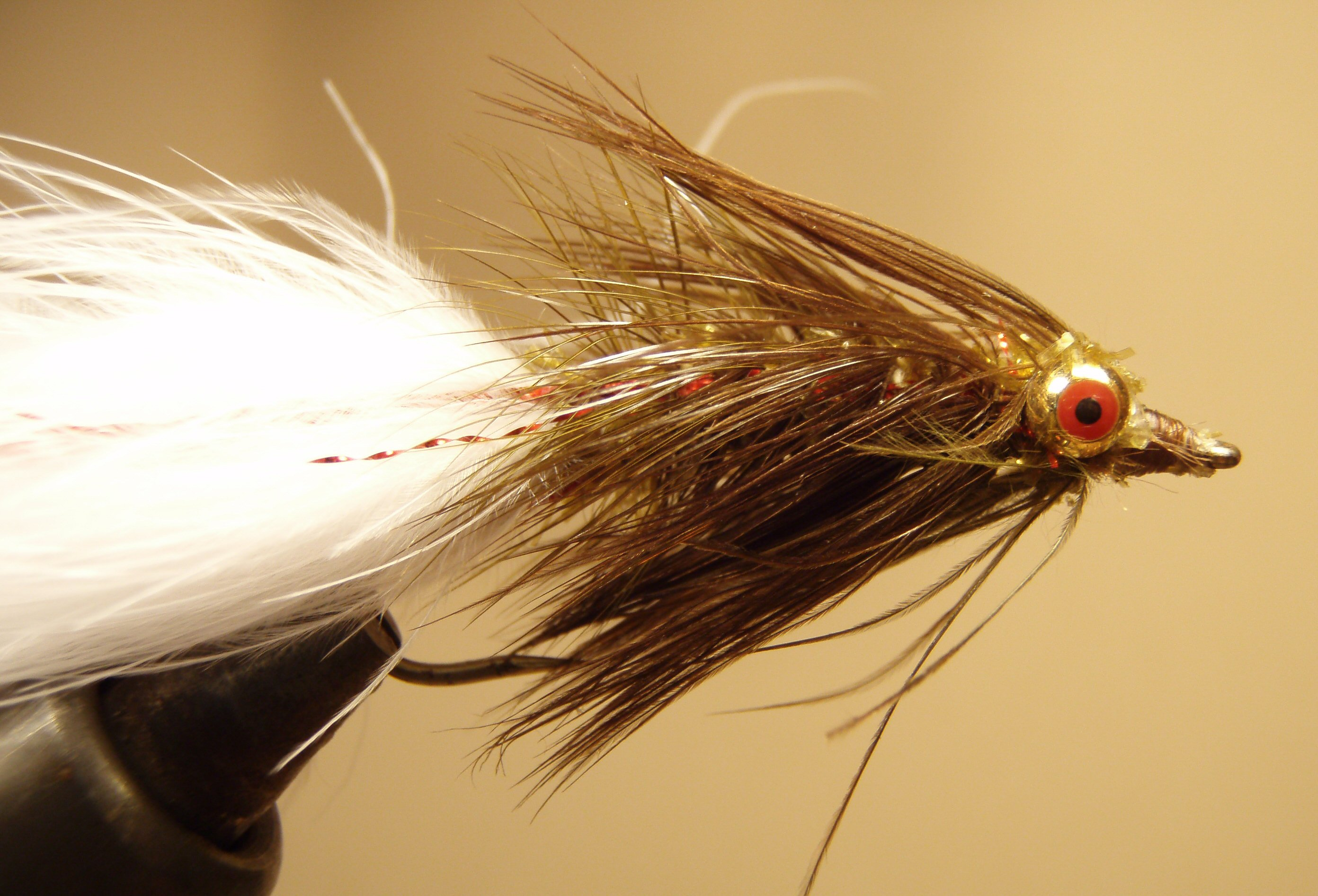
#4 Olive and White Dumbbell Eyed Woolly Bugger

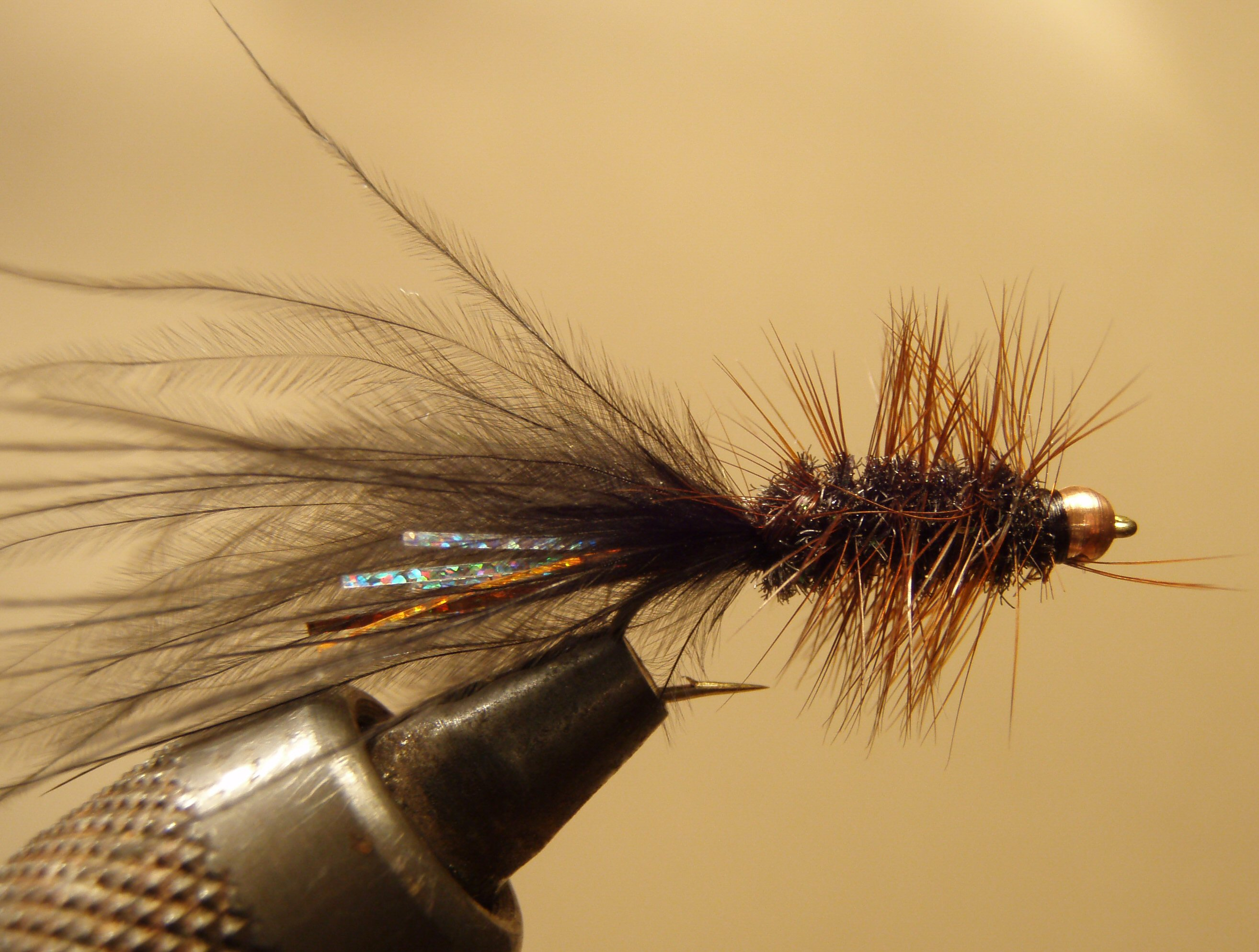
#6 Black and Brown Beadhead Woolly Bugger

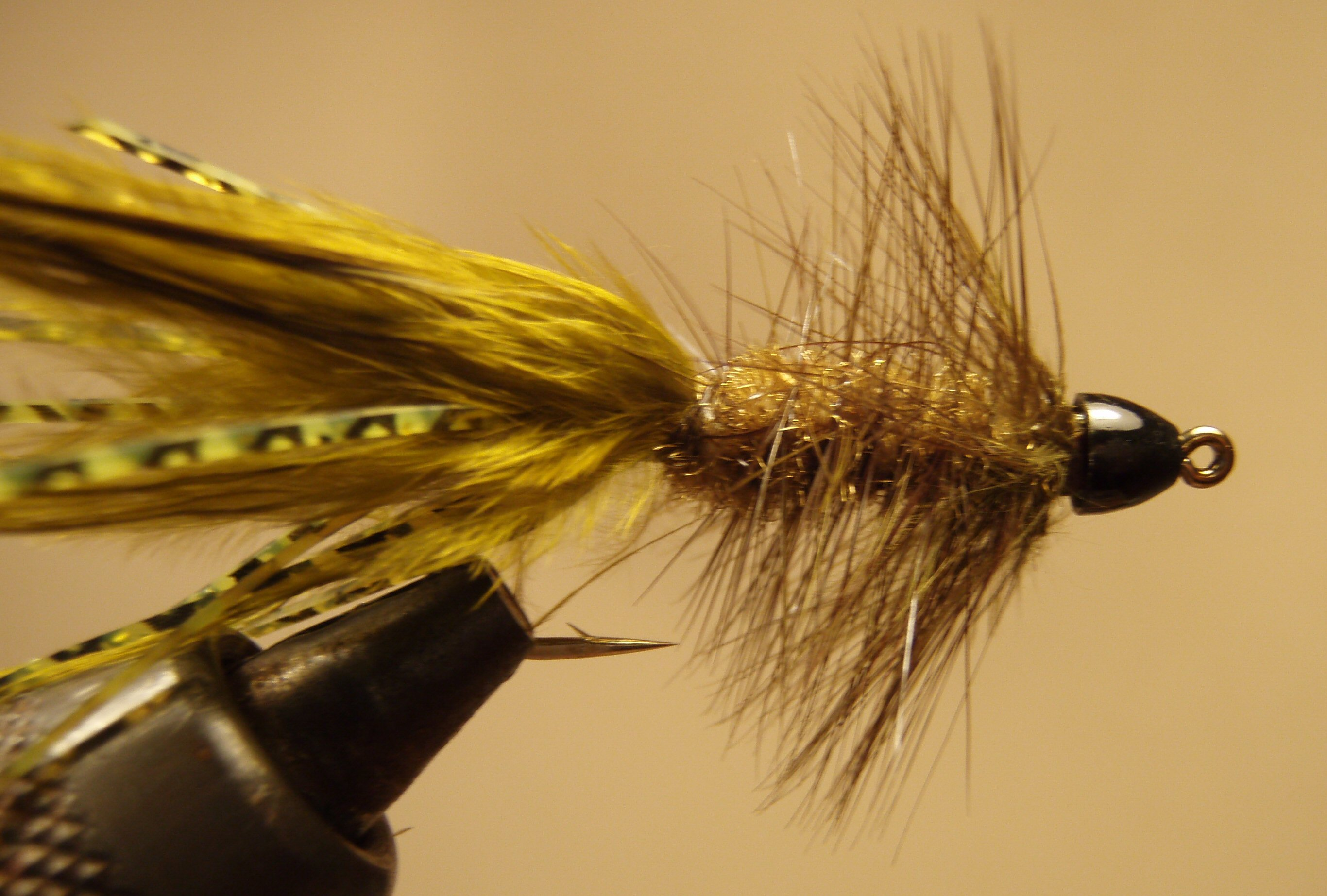
#6 Olive Rubber Tailed Conehead Woolly Bugger
