= The Lost World of Mr. Hardy =

- Theatrical release poster
- Directed by: Andy Heathcote; Heike Bachelier
- Produced by: Andy Heathcote; Heike Bachelier
- Starring: James L. Hardy
- Cinematography: Andy Heathcote
- Edited by: Heike Bachelier
- Music by: Stephen Daltry
- Distributed by: Trufflepig Films
- Release date: 30 June 2008 (London Film Focus)
- Running time: 93 minutes
- Country: United Kingdom
- Language: English

The Lost World of Mr. Hardy is a feature-length documentary film about a much loved family fishing tackle business. It was directed by Andy Heathcote and Heike Bachelier. The film tells the story of the disappearing art of the craftsman through the history of the Hardy Brothers, the Rolls-Royce of fishing tackle makers. The film includes rediscovered footage of salmon fishing 80 years ago shown with old film reels, filmed by L.R. Hardy and his chauffeur 'Appleby' in the 1920s.

The film was produced by Trufflepig Films who successfully self-distributed the project giving the film a UK cinema release in 2009/10. The film played well in rural cinemas across England.
