= Andy Heathcote =

British film director (born 1964)

- Born: born 1964
- Education: Northern Film School; Polish National Film School in Łódź
- Occupation: Filmmaker

Andy Heathcote (born 1964) is a British independent filmmaker specialising in documentary feature films. His projects are made within production company Trufflepig Films.

Heathcote grew up in Fife, Scotland. After taking a photography degree he trained as an assistant film editor for three years, working on commercials and corporate projects and in television news and current affairs. He has attended the Northern Film School and the Polish National Film School in Łódź.

== Filmography ==
- Of Fish & Foe (2017)
- The Moo Man (2013)
- The Lost World of Mr Hardy (2008)
- English Goodbye (2000)
- Sounds Like Sunlight (1997)
- Katarzyna (1993)
- Submariner (1992)

== See also ==
- Heathcote (surname)
