= Hardy Perfect =

The Hardy Perfect (also known as "the perfect") is a fly fishing reel produced by the British company, Hardy Bros. Ltd. since the late 19th century. The vintage and modern replica Perfects continue to be used by both traditionalists and contemporary anglers. Its design has remained fundamentally unchanged for over a century.

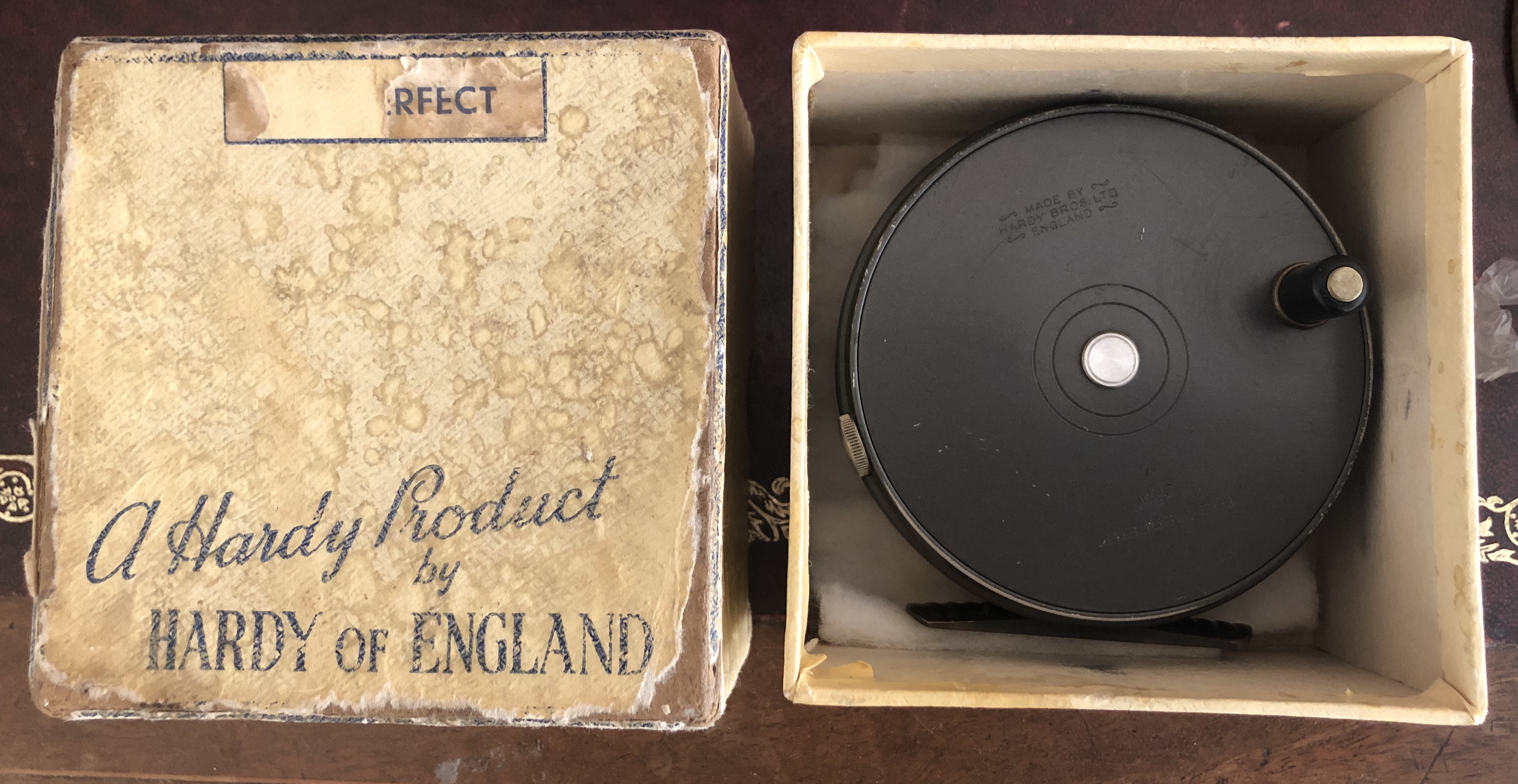
A 3 5/8 Hardy perfect fly fishing reel from the 1950s in its original box

== History ==
Foster Hardy was the third brother to join Hardy Bros. of Alnwick, Northumberland, England. He took over the company's reel department and went to work inventing a new reel that used ball bearings. This unique ball-bearing system and its adjustable click-check drag and a full-cage frame made it more reliable and smooth-running than its contemporaries. Foster’s first Patent no. 18373 dated 17 December 1888 described the workings and Patent no. 612 dated 13 January 1891 was the second, uniting the idea of incorporating ball bearings. The Hardy Perfect was first introduced in Hardy’s 1891 catalogue, its name, "Perfect," reflected the company's ambition to create the ideal fly reel.

By the end of 1891, Hardy Brothers were offering thirteen different sizes, reflecting its rapid success.

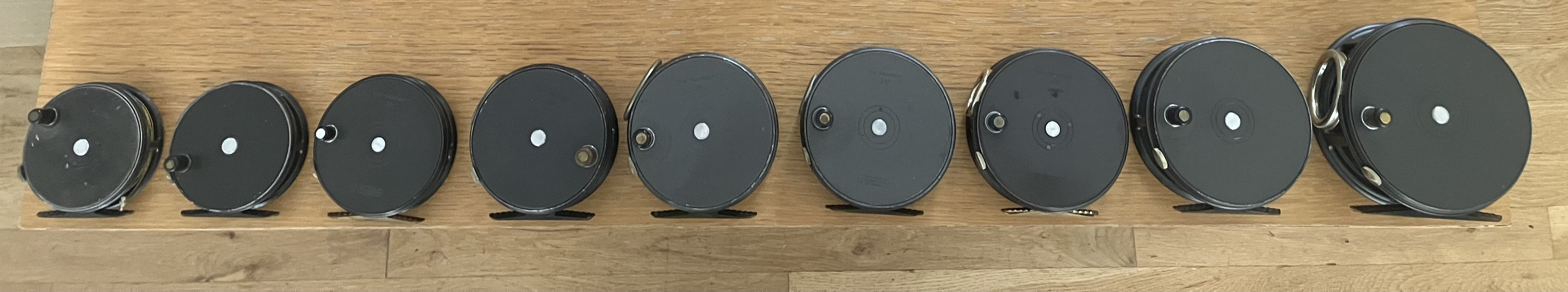
Post war Hardy Perfect reels ranging in size from 3 1/8 to 4/12

.

Inventor Foster Hardy continually refined the design, introducing numerous variations that have since become highly sought after. Early models featured brass construction and iron line guards, but by 1895 aluminium spools were adopted, with brass largely phased out by 1910. Throughout the 20th century, the Perfect was continuously refined, with various models produced for trout, salmon, and saltwater fishing.

Significant innovations during this period included the evolution of the spool cage, improvements to the drag mechanism, and the brief introduction of a Silent Check model between 1908 and 1910. Originally made for salmon fishing, the Perfect was expanded in 1895 to include trout models. These narrower versions known as "contracted" Perfects would eventually become the most population and longest-running models, remaining in production until 1995.

== Design and engineering ==
The defining features of the Hardy Perfect include:

- a solid aluminum construction that balances strength and weight
- a ball-bearing spindle, which was innovative for its time and ensured the reel operated smoothly
- The anodized finish in later versions provided corrosion resistance and a striking appearance.
- The distinctive click-check mechanism, known for its traditional ticking sound beloved by anglers

== Cultural significance ==
The Hardy Perfect has been associated with the golden era of British fly fishing. It was favored by royalty, including Edward VIII, and by prominent anglers such as G.E.M. Skues and Charles Ritz. Most recently King Charles III granted a royal warrant to Hardy. This represents the fourth warrant that specifically recognised Hardy’s excellence in supplying fly fishing tackle to members of the British Royal family.

Vintage Hardy Perfect reels are sought after by both anglers and collectors alike. In terms of rarity and value, the smallest sizes and the largest sizes command the highest prices. For example, the 2 ¼” all brass Perfect is considered to be one of the rarest, selling for a record £44,000 in 2014.

Modern replica Perfects are still made in Alnwick by Hardy, using many of the original design features, methods and machinery. Many anglers still prefer using these Perfects over modern drag systems when Spey casting for salmon or up stream dry fly for trout fishing.
