= Hardy (fishing) =

British fishing equipment manufacturer

Hardy Fishing Rods
- Company type: Subsidiary
- Industry: Fishing tackle manufacturing
- Predecessor: Superior River and Sea Fishing Tackle
- Founded: 1874; 152 years ago in Alnwick, Northumberland, England
- Founders: William Hardy and John James Hardy
- Headquarters: Alnwick, Northumberland, England
- Area served: Worldwide
- Products: Fishing rods, reels, lures, fishing guides
- Owner: Sycamore Partners
- Parent: Pure Fishing (division of Sycamore Partners)
- Website: www.hardyfishing.com

Hardy Fishing Rods is a brand of Pure Fishing.

== History ==
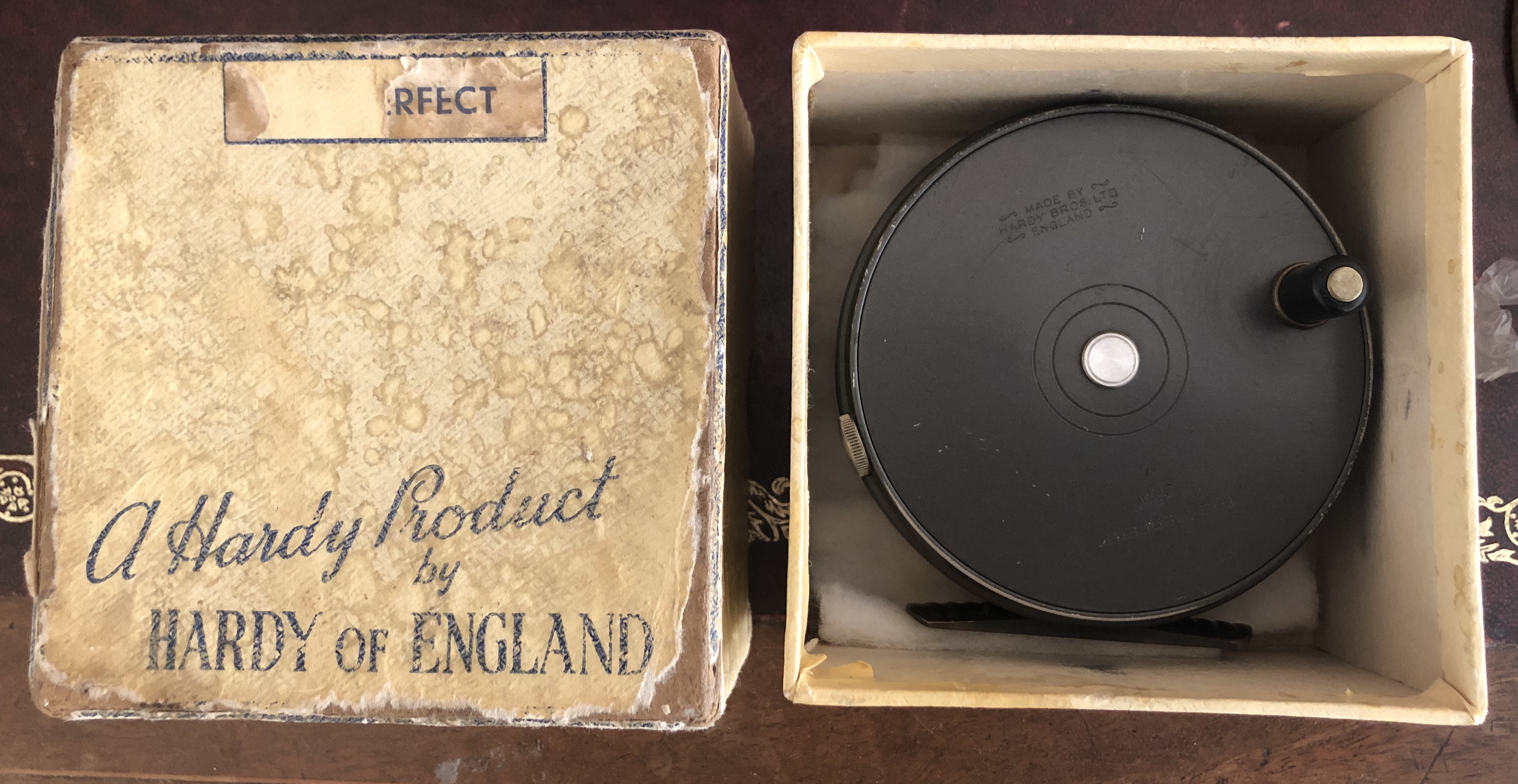
A boxed Hardy Perfect fly reel from the 1950s

In 1874, brothers William Hardy and John James Hardy started "Hardy Brothers" with the purchase of "Superior River and Sea Fishing Tackle" in Alnwick, Northumberland, England.

In 1891, they patented and launched "the Perfect" fishing reel to complement the fishing lures they sold. It was successful and they received a royal warrant from King George V of the United Kingdom. They continued to create a variety of winning fishing reels, some of which had novelties including a complete bail arm and long casting reels.

In 1897, they opened a shop in London's Pall Mall that lead to international expansion of their fishing rods, lures and guides still made by hand in England.

In 1967, Hardy Brothers was bought out by the Harris and Sheldon group and in 1985 renamed the "House of Hardy Limited." It was later merged with a former Hardy employee's fishing company and renamed "Hardy and Greys Limited" in 2004.

In 2008, the history of the House of Hardy was made into a documentary, The Lost World of Mr. Hardy.

In 2013, the company Hardy & Greys was sold to Pure Fishing, a division of conglomerate Jarden Corporation, that was later renamed Newell Brands. Newell sold Pure Fishing to Sycamore Partners in 2018. In 2024, it was granted a Royal Warrant by King Charles III in recognition of supplying flyfishing tackle to the Royal Household.
