= Dapping =

Dapping in nature, workshop practice, and in angling describes special examples of dipping, dabbing, or bouncing actions.

== Usage ==
The Oxford English Dictionary defined dap in part as follows: "daps" meaning "ways, modes of action"; hence in dialect, "likeness, image". A dap can be a bounce of a ball, etc. Correspondingly, as a verb, "dap" or "dape", is apparently parallel to "dab", the final "p" expressing a lighter touch. It can mean to fish by letting the bait dip and bob lightly onto the water. Also generally to rebound. In modern practice the term "dapping" is not commonly used except in specific senses.

== Technology ==
It can refer to the metalworking techniques known as "sinking", and in angling as letting the bait or lure bob lightly and repetitively down onto the water surface in the manner of certain behaviour patterns of gracile flying insects such as crane flies, mayflies, or caddisflies and others.

== Natural history ==
In natural history dapping is the motion that many aquatic flying insects engage in when laying their eggs. This is a mode of oviposition related to certain ecological strategies of reproduction. Among those best known for such behaviour are some Odonata (dragonflies and damselflies), many Trichoptera (caddisflies), craneflies, mosquitoes, and Ephemeroptera (mayflies). This action is highly attractive to certain fishes, and anglers try to imitate the effect.
