= Bimini twist =

Fishing knot

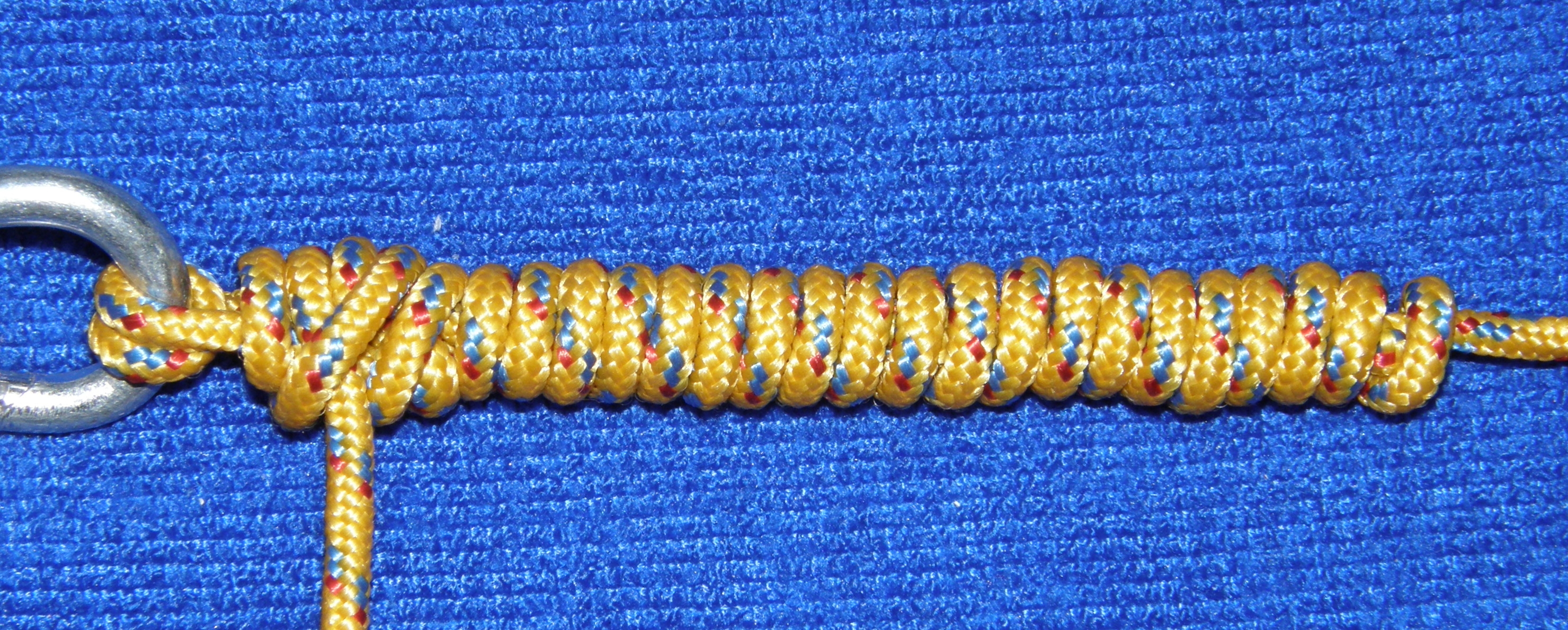

The Bimini twist is a fishing knot used for offshore trolling and sportsfishing and the creation of double-line leaders.

== Description ==
A Bimini twist creates a loop at the end of the line in which it is tied. The loop is secured at the top with a long barrel of coiled line created by the tying process. A Bimini twist loop is stronger than the line itself. It is one of the rare knots that does not weaken the line in which it is tied. It is a simple method of doubling your fishing line in order to prevent chafing or to create the necessary loop in order to attach a wind-on leader without using strength in the mainline. For use in fishing applications, the old standby is 20-30 initial twists in nylon monofilament and 60 or more initial-twists in Spectra-type braided line.

An article in Sportfishing Magazine in February 2007 made the claim that fewer twists created greater strength. However, the holding mechanism in a Bimini Twist is the friction created by the twists. It was quickly and has since been often demonstrated that the 12-twist knot (proposed in the article) in Spectra-braid slipped before breaking. It is not known what testing errors led to the erroneous conclusion that fewer twists made a stronger knot.

How to tie a Bimini twist

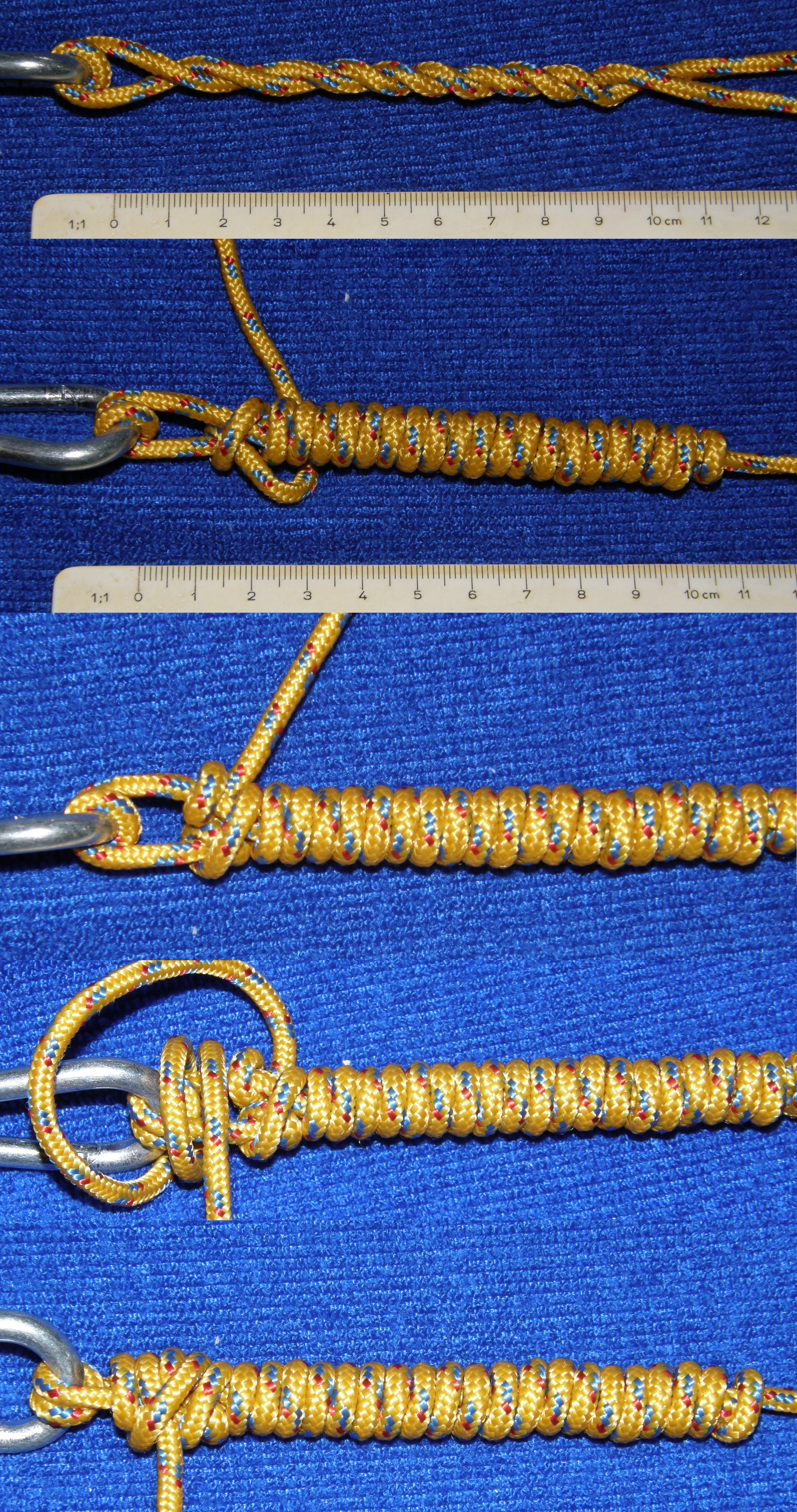
How to tie a Bimini twist

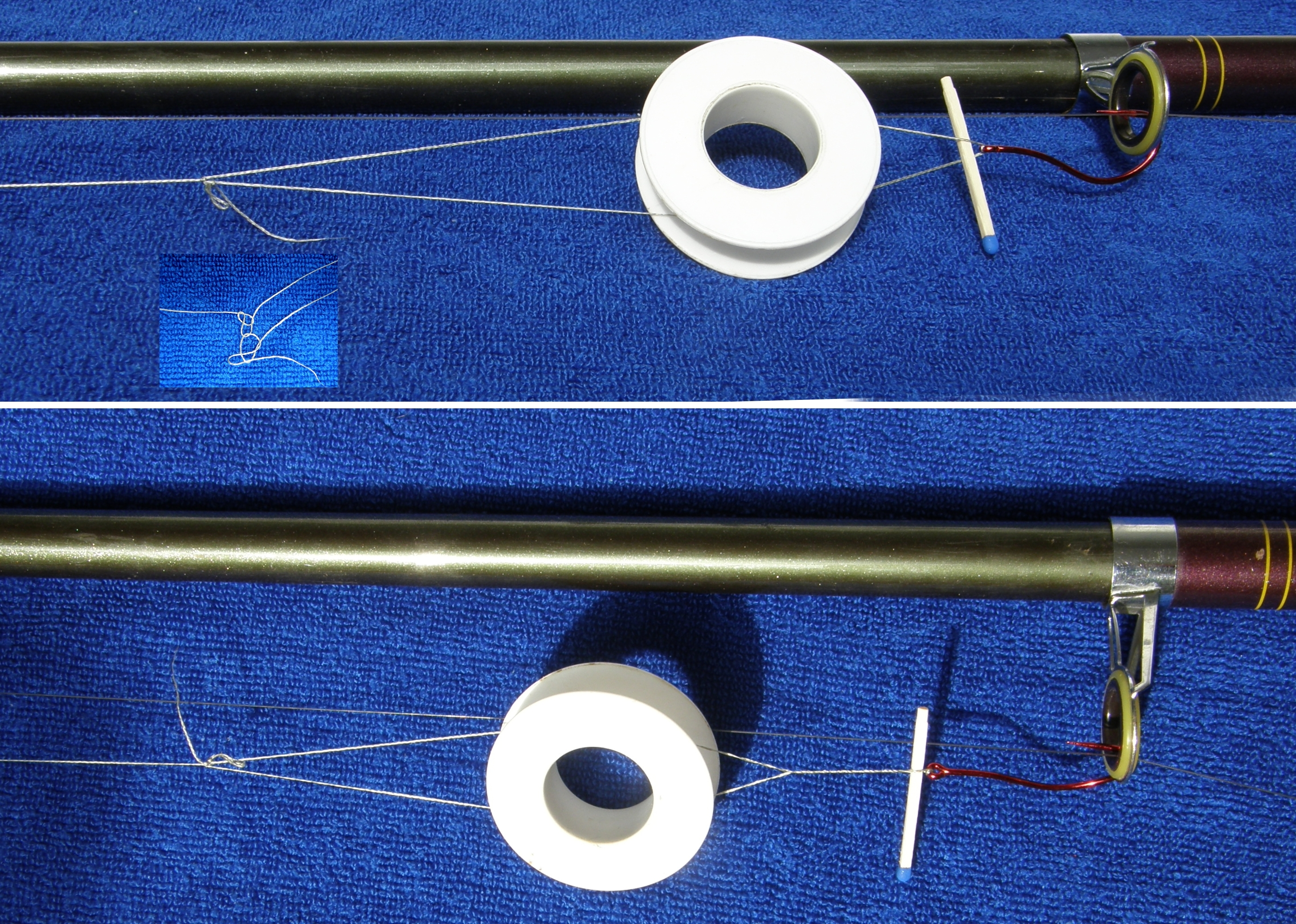
Tie with help
