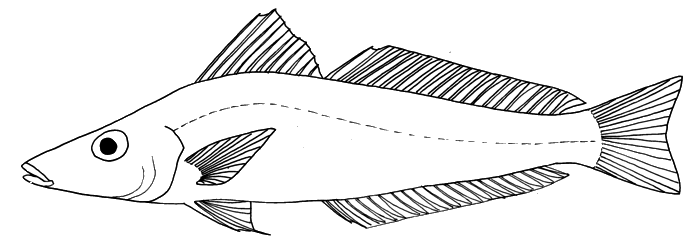

Scientific classification
- Kingdom: Animalia
- Phylum: Chordata
- Class: Actinopterygii
- Order: Acanthuriformes
- Family: Sillaginidae
- Genus: Sillago
- Species: S. soringa

Binomial name
- Sillago soringa Dutt & Sujatha, 1983
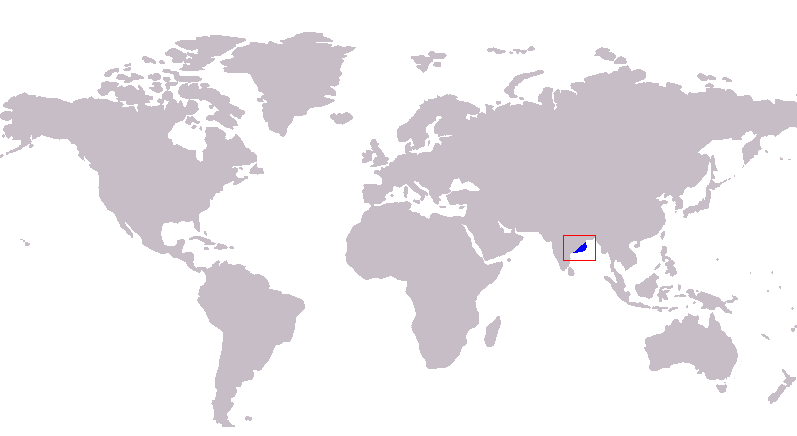
- Range of the Soringa whiting

= Soringa whiting =

Species of fish

The soringa whiting (Sillago soringa), also known simply as soringa or soringa sillago, is a poorly known species of coastal marine fish of the smelt-whiting family, Sillaginidae. The Soringa whiting is known exclusively from the east coast of India, inhabiting shallow inshore environments, particularly sandy substrates. S. soringa was first described in 1982 by Dutt and Sujatha, with the taxonomic status of the species was questioned by Roland McKay in his review of the Sillaginidae, with similar features to S. asiatica suggesting it is a senior synonym of the latter.

== Taxonomy and naming ==
The Soringa whiting is one of over 30 species in the genus Sillago, which is one of five genera belonging to the smelt whiting family Sillaginidae, this family was previously considered to be part of the Percoidea, a suborder of the Perciformes. The 5th edition of Fishes of the World classifies the Sillaginidae in the order Spariformes.

The species was first scientifically described by S. Dutt and J. Sujatha in 1982 based on a specimen taken from the western Bay of Bengal (near the Indian city of Visakhapatnam), which was later designated to be the holotype. The specimen was accidentally caught whilst carrying out a taxonomic study on ladyfish in the region, with a minitrawler being used to sample the area. Whilst reviewing the Sillaginidae, Roland McKay was unable to examine the holotype, but concedes S. soringa is very similar to S. asiatica morphologically, and is probably synonymous. McKay described S. asiatica in 1983, while S. soringa was described in 1982, thus giving it preference and rendering S. asiatica a junior synonym. Without the holotype, however, McKay retained both species pending further detailed studies on the species. The species is commonly referred to as 'soringa whiting', 'soringa sillago' or simply 'soringa', the name given to the fish on the Indian coast, and from which the specific name of the fish is derived.

== Description ==
The smelt-whitings are all very similar in their body morphology and external anatomy, with the Soringa whiting no exception. The species has a slightly compressed, elongate body tapering toward the terminal mouth, with a concave-up dorsal profile and a straight ventral profile. The maximum reported size for the Soringa whiting is 15 cm.

The fin anatomy is highly useful for identification purposes, with the species having 11 spines in the first dorsal fin, with one spine and 21 soft rays on the second dorsal fin. The anal fin has two spines with 22 soft rays posterior to the spines. The pectoral fins have 15-16 soft rays while the ventral fin consists of a single spine and 5 soft rays. Lateral line scales and cheek scales are also distinctive, with Soringa whiting possessing 64 to 68 lateral line scales and cheek scales positioned in 2 rows, the upper cycloid and the lower ctenoid. The rest of the body is covered in ctenoid scales. The amount of vertebrae is also diagnostic, having 34 in total. The swimbladder is the major distinguishing feature, being lanceolate with a single median finger like extensions and a pair of recurved anterior extensions each side. There is a single post coelomic extension, and a central blind tubular duct arising in on the ventral side of the swimbladder.

The Soringa whiting is a gray brown on the dorsal and upper flanks, becoming paler laterally, while the lower flanks and ventral surface are a milky white. Small discrete black spots populate the anterior dorsal fin membrane, becoming more numerous toward the anterior half of the fin. The soft dorsal fin has a continuous grey band, running parallel to and close to the anterior edge of each ray. The membrane of the anal fin has similar black dots to the dorsal, but to a lesser extent. The pectoral fin and ventral fins are golden to hyaline while the caudal fin is hyaline with black dots.

== Distribution and habitat ==
The Soringa whiting is currently only known from the east coast of India and thus only from a small area of the Indian Ocean. Is likely the range of the species may be greater than this however, due to confusion with S. asiatica and S. sihama, resulting in the small reported range.

Soringa whiting, like most sillaginids is an inshore species and is known to inhabit sandy substrates at 5 to 30 m depth. Researchers studying digenean parasites on sillaginids have noted S. soringa, S. lutea and S. indica show seasonal migrations where the juveniles occur in shallow coastal waters during winter months and move offshore during summer. Nothing else is known of the species biology or ecology. Due to confusion with other species, its contribution to local fisheries is unknown, possibly being locally important.
