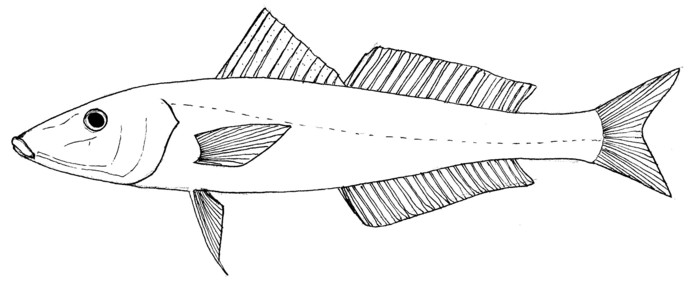

Scientific classification
- Kingdom: Animalia
- Phylum: Chordata
- Class: Actinopterygii
- Order: Acanthuriformes
- Family: Sillaginidae
- Genus: Sillago
- Species: S. microps

Binomial name
- Sillago microps McKay, 1985
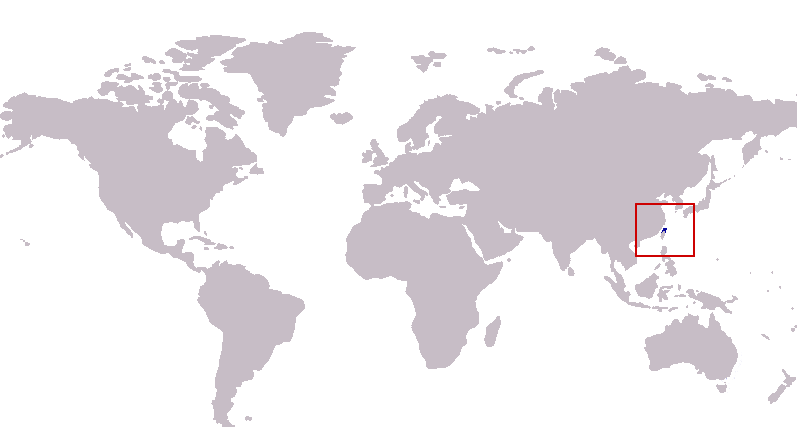
- Range of the small-eyed whiting

= Small-eyed whiting =

Species of fish

The small-eyed whiting (Sillago microps) is a poorly known species of coastal marine fish of the smelt-whiting family Sillaginidae. The species is known from only two specimens; the holotype collected by Roland McKay in 1985 from a Taipei market, both specimens of which were taken from the waters of Taiwan. Apart from a relatively small eye size, the species is hard to distinguish from other common species of sillaginid taken in the area, and may be a minor part of local fisheries.

== Taxonomy and naming ==
The small-eyed whiting is one of over 30 species in the genus Sillago, which is one of five genera belonging to the smelt whiting family Sillaginidae, this family was previously considered to be part of the Percoidea, a suborder of the Perciformes. The 5th edition of Fishes of the World classifies the Sillaginidae in the order Spariformes.

The species was first described by Roland McKay in his 1985 review of the Sillaginidae based on two specimens collected from a Taipei market, Taiwan; one of which was designated to be the type specimen. The species binomial and common names both reflect the distinguishing feature of the species; its unusually small eyes.

== Description ==
The small-eyed whiting is very similar in appearance to other members of the genus Sillago, with the only obvious distinguishing feature of the species being its unusually small eye size (only 14% to 16% of head length), as well as its swim bladder morphology. Other diagnostic features include the spine and ray counts, with the first spinous dorsal fin having 11 spines and the second dorsal fin having one spine and 19 soft rays. The anal fin has two spines followed by 19 soft rays. The species has 34 vertebrae and 68 to 69 lateral line scales, with cycloid cheek scales. The species reaches at least 20 cm in length.

The body is a pale to dull brown colour, lighter on the underside of the fish and usually having a faint mid-lateral band below the lateral line. The fins are all hyaline in colour with the exception of the spinous dorsal fin which is dusky at the tips, with five or six rows of dusky spots on the membranes of the second dorsal fin.

== Distribution and habitat ==
The only two recorded specimens of the small-eyed whiting were taken from a market in Taipei, Taiwan. No other records of the fish have been reported. The habitat of the species is also largely unknown, but the only specimens were taken alongside both Sillago sihama and Sillago parvisquamis which inhabit primarily sandy and silty substrates in major estuaries, thus indicating S. microps may as well.

Nothing else is known of the biology or the contribution to local fisheries of the small-eyed whiting.
