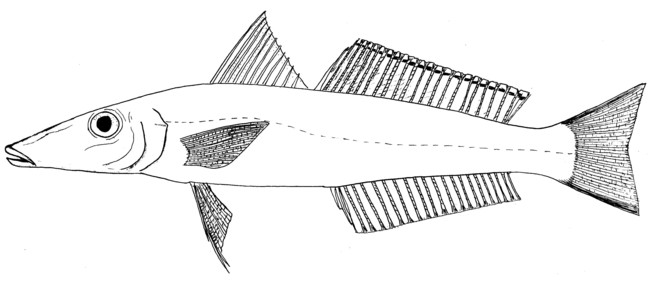

Scientific classification
- Domain: Eukaryota
- Kingdom: Animalia
- Phylum: Chordata
- Class: Actinopterygii
- Order: Acanthuriformes
- Family: Sillaginidae
- Genus: Sillago
- Species: S. asiatica

Binomial name
- Sillago asiatica McKay, 1983
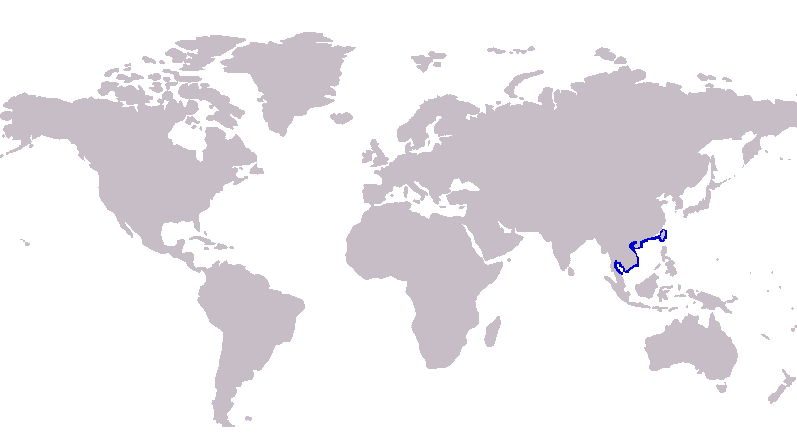
- Range of the Asian whiting

= Asian whiting =

Species of fish

The Asian whiting (Sillago asiatica) is a species inshore marine fish in the smelt whiting family, Sillaginidae, distributed along the Asian coastline from the Gulf of Thailand to Taiwan. The Asian whiting's appearance is very similar to other closely related species in the genus Sillago, with swim bladder morphology and ray counts of fins the most reliable identifying features. The species inhabits slightly deeper water than many of the sillaginid species its distribution overlaps, forming an important part of the whiting fishery in the countries within its range.

== Taxonomy and naming ==
The Asian whiting is one of over 30 species in the genus Sillago, which is one of five genera belonging to the smelt whiting family Sillaginidae, this family was previously considered to be part of the Percoidea, a suborder of the Perciformes. The 5th edition of Fishes of the World classifies the Sillaginidae in the order Spariformes.

The species was described and named Sillago asiatica by McKay in 1983 based on the holotype specimen taken from Chantaburi in the Gulf of Thailand in 1975, with paratypes from Taiwan also examined. The species had been known from a small sample of Sillago species taken from Thailand but was considered to be a subspecies of S. japonica by the biologists who first examined it. A review of the holotype by McKay led to the correct identification, with the author noting that the swim bladder morphology and vertebrae count were beyond any variation in S. japonica. The name is derived from 'Asiaticus', meaning Asiatic, which is also reflected in the species' common name.

== Description ==
The profile of the Asian whiting is typical of all members of the genus Sillago, possessing an elongate, slightly compressed body covered in ctenoid scales, tapering toward the terminal mouth. The head of the species is more dorsoventrally compressed that most other sillaginids, although more detailed analysis is needed to confirm the identity a specimen. The species has a known maximum size of 15 cm, making it one of the smaller smelt-whitings.

The first dorsal fin contains 11 spines while the second has one spine and 20 or 21 soft rays. The anal fin has 2 spines with between 21 and 23 soft rays posterior to the spines. The lateral line scales number between 67 and 70, while there are 34 vertebrae. The swim bladder morphology is also distinctive, with three anterior extensions, the middle one projecting forward and the anterolateral ones curving backward along the swim bladder. There is a single posterior extension toward the caudal region. A duct like process is present from the ventral surface to the urogenital opening.

The Asian whiting has a typical sillaginid colouring, with the body and head a pale sandy brown to light fawn, often with an indistinct pale midlateral band. The belly is paler than the body, occasionally white. The operculum is transparent with a crescentic patch of fine black-brown spots in a pigmented area. The fines are hyaline in appearance with the unpaired fins spotted with brown. The upper and lower margins of the caudal fins are shaded dark brown to black.

== Distribution and habitat ==
The Asian whiting is distributed along the Asian coastline from the South of the Gulf of Thailand northward to upper Taiwan. The species may be even more widespread to the west into the Indian Ocean, however it is often confused with S. sihama. The Asian whiting inhabits slightly deeper water than many of the genus Sillago, living in water between 10 and 50m deep, venturing into larger estuaries on occasion. Very little else is known about the species' biology or ecology.

== Relationship to humans ==
A number of smelt-whiting species are present throughout the range of the Asian whiting and are taken as food for local consumption. There is often no distinction between species and the total catch of the species is unknown, but it certainly makes up a proportion of the whiting taken. The most important fishery where the species is involved is in Taiwan.
