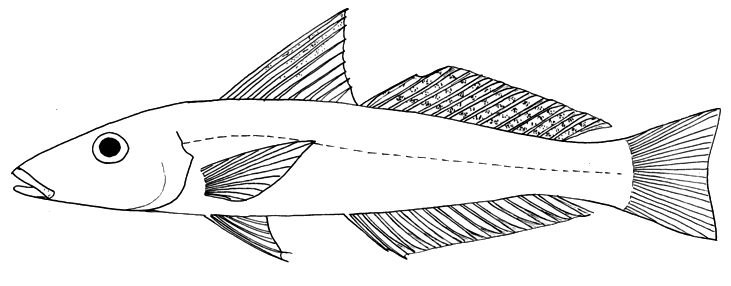

Scientific classification
- Kingdom: Animalia
- Phylum: Chordata
- Class: Actinopterygii
- Order: Acanthuriformes
- Family: Sillaginidae
- Genus: Sillago
- Species: S. vincenti

Binomial name
- Sillago vincenti McKay, 1980
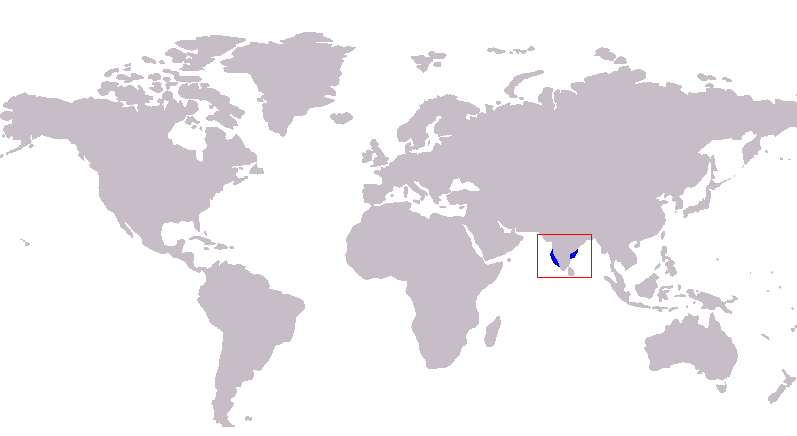
- Range of the estuarine whiting

= Estuarine whiting =

Species of fish

The estuarine whiting (Sillago vincenti), also known as Vincent's whiting, is a species of benthic inshore marine fish of the smelt-whiting family, Sillaginidae. The estuarine whiting is very similar in appearance to the northern whiting, Sillago sihama, and as such was mistaken for the latter until 1980, when R.J. McKay identified the species based primarily on swimbladder morphology. The estuarine whiting is distributed along both the east and west coasts of India, primarily inhabiting the muddy substrates of estuaries. The species is locally important to fisheries in India, and is recognized as having aquaculture potential.

== Taxonomy and naming ==
The estuarine whiting is one of over 30 species in the genus Sillago, which is one of five genera belonging to the smelt whiting family Sillaginidae, this family was previously considered to be part of the Percoidea, a suborder of the Perciformes. The 5th edition of Fishes of the World classifies the Sillaginidae in the order Spariformes.

The species was first scientifically described by Roland McKay of the Queensland Museum in 1980, who was the first to recognize it as a distinct species from the anatomically similar S. sihama. McKay designated a specimen collected in 1965 from Mandapam Camp in India to be the holotype. It is commonly known as the estuarine whiting in reference to its preferred habitat, as well as Vincent's whiting in relation to its specific name. In India it is also referred to as 'Kalimeen'.

== Etymology ==
The fish is named in honor of S. G. Vincent, a Technical Officer of the Central Marine Fisheries Research Institute in Cochin, India, for his assistance in collecting the type specimens.

== Description ==
The estuarine whiting is very similar to S. sihama in its external morphology, with a dissection of the swimbladder required to identify the species in the field. The species is known to reach a maximum length of 30 cm. The external morphology is similar to all sillaginids, having a fairly straight ventral profile and a slightly curved dorsal profile. The dorsal fin is composed of two sections, the first consisting of 11 spines, while the second, longer dorsal has a single spine followed by 21 to 23 soft rays posteriorally. The anal fin has two spines and is followed by 22 or 24 soft rays. The scales are ctenoid in nature except for the cheek scales, of which there are 2 rows of cycloid scales. There are 70 to 74 lateral line scales and 34 vertebrae in total.

The anterior extremity of the swimbladder has a very short bulbous projection with 1 to 3 short anterolateral lobate or recurved extensions either side of the central projection. There is a single post coelomic extension and a duct like process on the ventral surface that continues to the vent.

The estuarine whiting's body and head are sandy to light olive above with a silvery side and a whitish belly. The head has a deeper golden tinge, as do parts of the silvery sides, which do not have a distinct lateral silver band. The eye has a silver iris and a golden outer surface, while the snout has a dusky tinge. The opercle is also dark yellow to golden. The spinous dorsal fin is hyaline with the tips of the membranes dusky and blotched with fine dusted black spots. The second dorsal fin is hyaline to pale white with 5 to 7 rows of blackish spots, giving a vague appearance of lateral bands. The anal fin is also hyaline to milky white with white or yellow tips. The pectoral fin base is golden yellow, the ventral is white with a yellowish tip and the caudal fin is hyaline to dusky.

== Distribution and habitat ==
The estuarine whiting is distributed on both the eastern and western coasts of India, with an apparent break in its range on the southern tip of India. This would suggest there are two separate populations, but it is possible the fish has just not been identified correctly in this region. The species occurs in shallow inshore waters between 0 and 10 m deep, usually frequenting estuaries with muddy substrates. Estuarine whiting have also been known to form schools with northern whiting in these environments, adding to identification problems.

== Biology and fishery ==
The biology and ecology of the species is relatively unknown, with only two studies concentrated on estuarine whiting. In his description of S. vincenti, McKay noted that egg bearing females of 25 to 28 cm in length were present in January and February, suggesting this to be at least part of the spawning period. The second study was an investigation into the species diet, and was presented at the First Indian Fisheries Forum held in 1987. The publication of this meeting's proceedings is somewhat rare outside of India and thus can not be commented on at the present.

Estuarine whiting, along with other common sillaginids, are locally important to fisheries in India. Fishermen often catch the species in the upper reaches of estuaries, making it important in many communities situated in deltaic regions of India. The species is recognized as having considerable potential for aquaculture in impoundments and tidal ponds, with a reported rapid growth rate.
