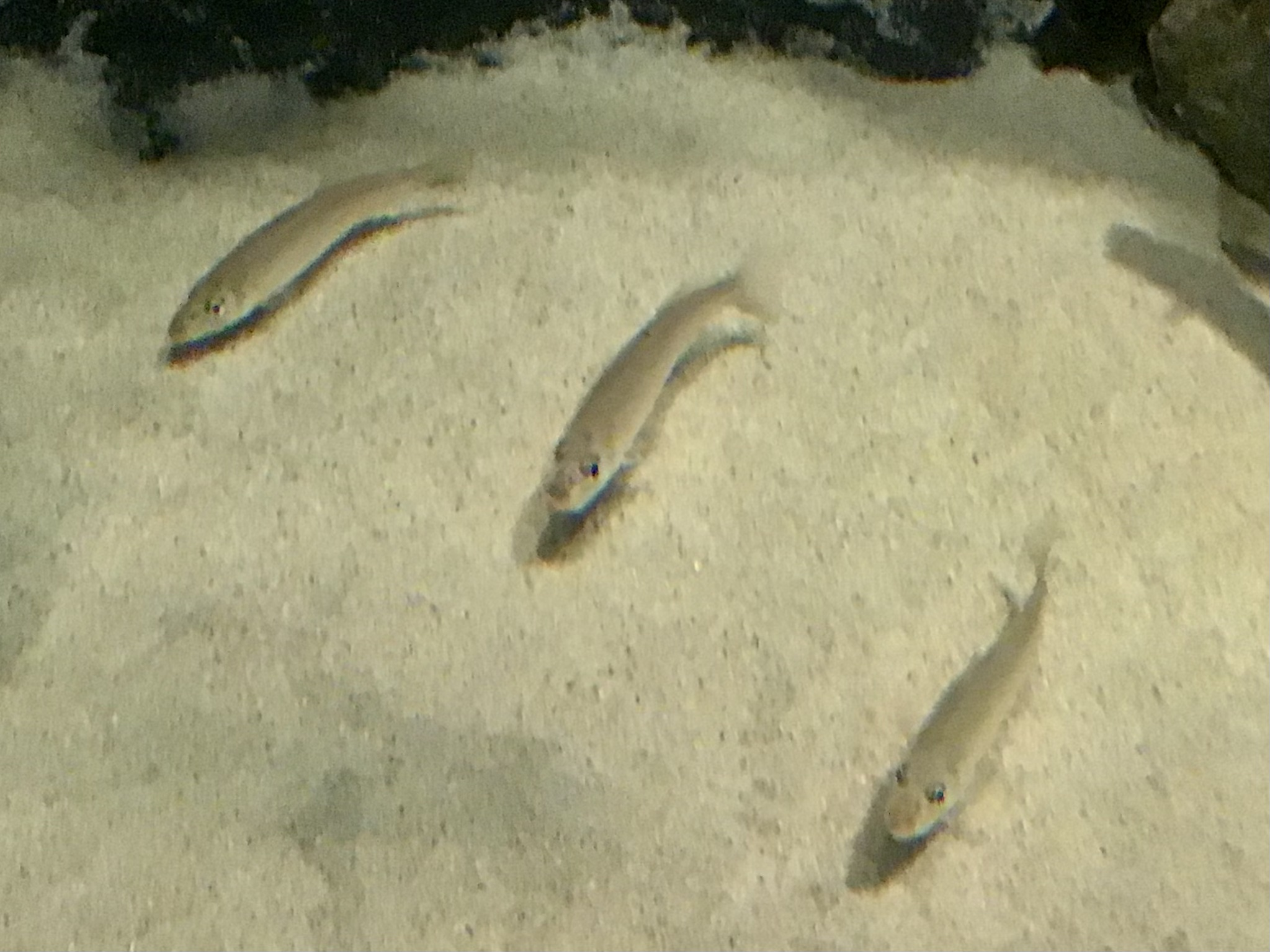
- Individuals at the Kuwait Scientific Center

Conservation status
- Least Concern (IUCN 3.1)

Scientific classification
- Kingdom: Animalia
- Phylum: Chordata
- Class: Actinopterygii
- Order: Acanthuriformes
- Family: Sillaginidae
- Genus: Sillago
- Species: S. attenuata

Binomial name
- Sillago attenuata McKay, 1985
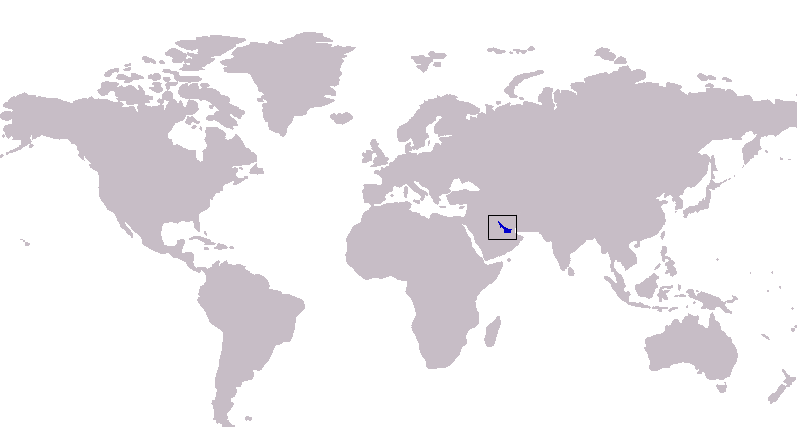
- Range of the Slender whiting

= Slender whiting =

Species of fish

The slender whiting (Sillago attenuata) is a poorly known species of inshore marine fish of the smelt whiting family, Sillaginidae that has a distribution limited to the Persian Gulf only. The Slender whiting, like most sillaginids requires careful study to determine its identity, with ray and vertebrae counts as well as swim bladder morphology distinguishing features. This inshore species of fish is commonly taken by fishermen using beach seines and is sold fresh in local markets.

== Taxonomy and naming ==
The Slender whiting is one of over 30 species in the genus Sillago, which is one of five genera belonging to the smelt whiting family Sillaginidae, this family was previously considered to be part of the Percoidea, a suborder of the Perciformes. The 5th edition of Fishes of the World classifies the Sillaginidae in the order Spariformes.

The species was first identified and named Sillago attenuata by McKay in 1985 from the holotype specimen collected in 1948 from Ras Tanura, Zaal Island in the Persian Gulf, with a number of paratypes also examined. The name of the species is derived from the Latin 'attenuatus', meaning attenuated or slender, reflected in the species common name.

== Description ==
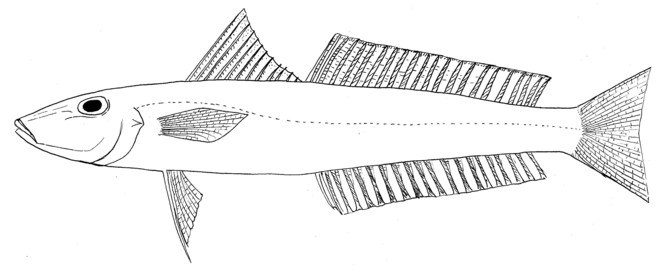
Illustration of an individual

The Slender whiting has the same basic body profile as all the smelt whiting species, with an elongate, slightly compressed body covered in ctenoid scales, tapering toward the terminal mouth. Being one of three species known from the Persian Gulf, further anatomical features must be examined before the species can be confidently identified.

The first dorsal fin consists of 12 or 13 spines, with the second dorsal fin having a single spine and 19 to 21 soft rays. The anal fin is similar to the second dorsal fin, but having 2 spines and between 18 and 20 soft rays. Other identifying features are the lateral line scale count, which numbers between 73 and 77 in the species, and the vertebrae count which is 37 to 39.

The swim bladder is almost transparent and much more delicate than other members of Sillago. The specimen examined by McKay had an elongate oval shaped swim bladder with two rudimentary posterior extensions and no anterior extension. A delicate ductile process is present on the posterior ventral surface of the swim bladder.

The overall colour of the Slender whiting is a light sandy brown, with two series of faint blotches running laterally. The upper row of these blotches has about 8 or 9 spots while the lower mid-lateral row has 10 spots. A row of indistinct spots or blotches runs along the base of the first, spinous dorsal fin, whose anterior most interspinous membranes are dusted with black spots. The membrane of the second dorsal fin dusted with black, while all other fins are hyaline in appearance. Juveniles have a well defined mid lateral horizontal row of 9 elongate spots just below the lateral line.

== Distribution and habitat ==
The Slender whiting, like the Shortnose whiting, has a range confined entirely to the Persian Gulf, where it inhabits shallow coastal waters. The species frequents beaches and most likely inhabits tidal flats along the coast. Nothing else is known about the biology or habitat of this species.

== Importance to humans ==
The slender whiting is a common catch for subsistence and minor commercial fishermen along the coast of the Persian Gulf, where it is sold fresh in local markets. Like many other Sillago species, it is taken alongside other smelt-whitings and no attempt is made to distinguish the species, as they are caught solely for consumption in an area with little to no fishing regulations or studies.
