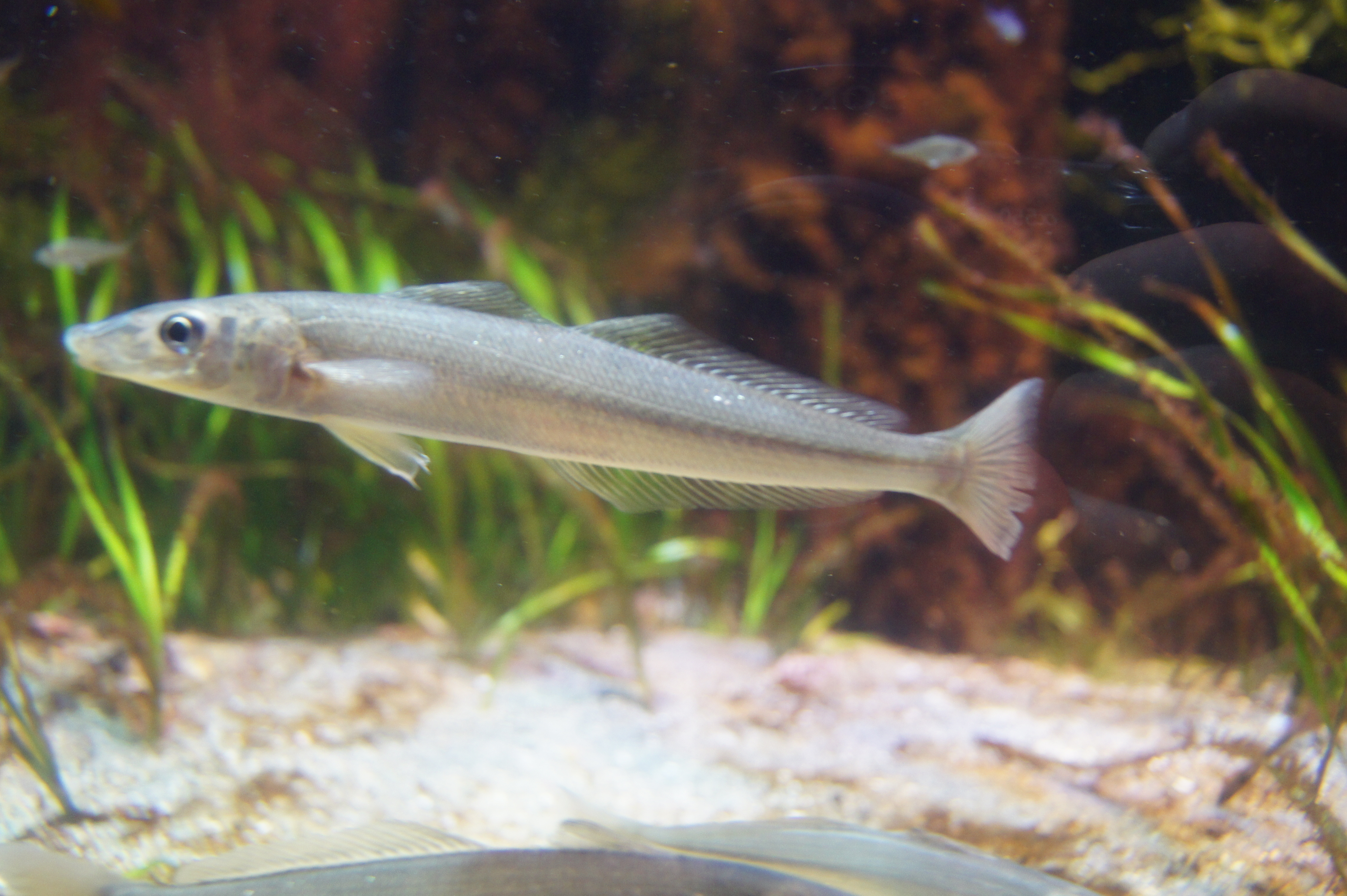
- Sillago parvisquamis

Scientific classification
- Kingdom: Animalia
- Phylum: Chordata
- Class: Actinopterygii
- Division: Teleostei
- Order: Acanthuriformes
- Family: Sillaginidae
- Genus: Sillago; G. Cuvier, 1817

Type species
- Sillago acuta Cuvier, 1817

= Sillago =

Sillago Temporal range: 33.9–0 Ma Early Oligocene to Present

Genus of fishes

Sillago is a genus of fish in the family Sillaginidae and the only non-monotypic genus in the family. Distinguishing the species can be difficult, with many similar in appearance and colour, forcing the use of swim bladder morphology as a definitive feature. All species are benthic in nature and generally coastal fish, living in shallow, protected waters although there are exceptions. Minor fisheries exist around various species of Sillago, making them of minor importance in most of their range. This genus has the widest distribution of any smelt-whiting genus, spanning much of the Indo-Pacific. The genus ranges from the east coast of Africa to Japan in the east and Southern Australia in the south, with most species concentrated around South East Asia, the Indonesian Archipelago and Australia. Many species have overlapping distribution, often making positive identification hard.

== Taxonomy ==
The genus Sillago is one of five genera in the family Sillaginidae, was previously considered to be part of the Percoidea, a suborder of the Perciformes. The 5th edition of Fishes of the World classifies the Sillaginidae in the order Spariformes. The name was first coined by famed taxonomist Georges Cuvier as a genus for his newly described species, Sillago acuta, which was later found to be a junior synonym of S. sihama. John Richardson placed the genus, along with Sillaginodes and Sillaginopsis in a family, which he named the Sillaginidae in 1846. Many species, both valid and invalid were added to the genus and it was not until 1985 when Roland McKay of the Queensland Museum published a revision of the family Sillaginidae that the complex relationships between these names was cleared up. McKay further divided Sillago into three subgenera based primarily on the morphology of the swim bladder.

== Species ==
There are currently 36 recognized species in this genus:

- Sillago aeolus D. S. Jordan & Evermann, 1902 (Oriental sillago)
- Sillago analis Whitley, 1943 (Golden-lined sillago)
- Sillago arabica McKay & McCarthy, 1989 (Arabian sillago)
- Sillago argentifasciata C. T. Martin & Montalban, 1935 (Silver-banded sillago)
- Sillago asiatica McKay, 1982 (Asian sillago)
- Sillago attenuata McKay, 1985 (Slender sillago)
- Sillago bassensis G. Cuvier, 1829 (Western school sillago)
- Sillago boutani Pellegrin, 1905 (Boutan's sillago)
- Sillago burrus J. Richardson, 1842 (Western trumpeter sillago)
- Sillago caudicula Kaga, Imamura & Nakaya, 2010
- Sillago ciliata G. Cuvier, 1829 (Sand sillago)
- Sillago flindersi McKay, 1985 (Flinders' sillago)
- Sillago indica McKay, Dutt & Sujatha, 1985 (Indian sillago)
- Sillago ingenuua McKay, 1985 (Bay sillago)
- Sillago intermedia Wongratana, 1977 (Intermediate sillago)
- Sillago japonica Temminck & Schlegel, 1843 (Japanese sillago)
- Sillago lutea McKay, 1985 (Mud sillago)
- Sillago maculata Quoy & Gaimard, 1824 (Trumpeter sillago)
- Sillago malabarica (Bloch & Schneider, 1801)
- Sillago megacephalus S. Y. Lin, 1933 (Large-headed sillago)
- Sillago microps McKay, 1985 (Small-eyed sillago)
- Sillago nierstraszi Hardenberg, 1941 (Rough sillago)
- Sillago nigrofasciata J. G. Xiao, Zheng-Sen Yu, Na Song & T. X. Gao, 2021 (Black-banded sillago)
- Sillago panhwari Panhwar, Farooq, Qamar, Shaikh & Mairaj, 2017
- Sillago parasihama Gao, Xiao & Guo, 2022
- Sillago parvisquamis T. N. Gill, 1861 (Small-scale sillago)
- Sillago persica Barani, Alavi-Yeganeh & Ghanbarifardi, 2025
- Sillago robusta Stead, 1908 (Stout sillago)
- Sillago schomburgkii W. K. H. Peters, 1864 (Yellow-fin sillago)
- Sillago shaoi T. X. Gao & J. G. Xiao, 2016
- Sillago sihama (Forsskål, 1775) (Silver sillago)
- Sillago sinica T. X. Gao, Ji, J. G. Xiao, T. Q. Xue, Yanagimoto & Setoguma, 2011 (Chinese sillago)
- Sillago soringa Dutt & Sujatha, 1982
- Sillago suezensis Golani, R. Fricke & Tikochinski, 2013
- Sillago vincenti McKay, 1980 (Vincent's sillago)
- Sillago vittata McKay, 1985 (Banded sillago)

== Relationship to humans ==
Various species of this genus represent minor local fisheries in their ranges, with many having commercial importance. Fish are taken by a variety of methods including seine, gill and cast nets as well as by line. Recreational fishing for them is common, especially in Australia where they are valued as food fish or for live bait for larger species. Estuarine aquaculture in India, Japan and Taiwan has utilized sillagos as an important species and similar trials have been conducted in Australia.
