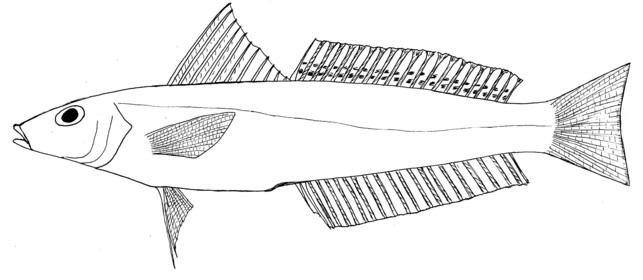

Scientific classification
- Kingdom: Animalia
- Phylum: Chordata
- Class: Actinopterygii
- Order: Acanthuriformes
- Family: Sillaginidae
- Genus: Sillago
- Species: S. boutani

Binomial name
- Sillago boutani Pellegrin, 1905
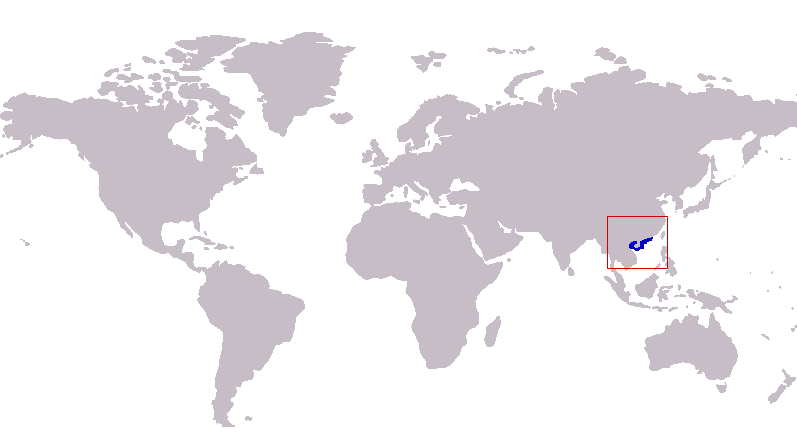
- Range of Boutan's whiting

= Boutan's whiting =

Species of fish

Boutan's whiting (Sillago boutani) is a poorly understood species of coastal marine fish of the smelt-whiting family Sillaginidae that inhabits the waters of the Gulf of Tonkin and south eastern China. Like most sillaginids, the species inhabits areas populated with a number of other whiting species of similar appearance, causing the species to often be misidentified as the well known Sillago sihama, and for this reason its biology is poorly known. The species is taken by seine net in Vietnam and is often exported to Japan.

== Taxonomy and naming ==
Boutan's whiting is one of over 30 species in the genus Sillago, which is one of five genera belonging to the smelt whiting family Sillaginidae, this family was previously considered to be part of the Percoidea, a suborder of the Perciformes. The 5th edition of Fishes of the World classifies the Sillaginidae in the order Spariformes.

The species was first validly described by Pellegrin in 1905 from the holotype specimen collected from Hạ Long Bay, in northern Vietnam. In a major review of the Sillaginidae in 1985, McKay proposed the three subgenera of Sillago, of which S. boutani fell into the 'Parasillago'. This created the synonym of Sillago (?Parasillago) boutani, which is still used, depending on if the subgenera are accepted. All members of the Sillago may have a name in the format Sillago (subgenus) species.

In 1933, Fowler noted the fin ray and lateral line scale counts are very similar to the now invalid S. bostockii, a claim which was dismissed by McKay (1985) on the basis of vertebrae numbers.

== Etymology ==
The fish is named in honor of Louis Boutan (1859-1934), a zoologist and underwater photography pioneer, who had led a scientific mission to ViêtNam during which the type specimen was collected.

== Description ==
Boutan's whiting has a very similar profile to other members of the genus Sillago, with a slightly compressed, elongate body tapering toward the terminal mouth. The species is very similar to much more common Sillago sihama and is often misidentified, with counts of spines, rays and lateral line scales needed for identification. The first dorsal fin has 11 spines of which the posterior most one is very small, with the second dorsal fin having one spines followed by 21 soft rays. The anal fin has two spines followed by 21 or 22 soft rays, while the lateral line scale count is 76 to 80 and the vertebrae count is 38.

The swim bladder has three large anterior protrusions, the two lateral most extensions having a branch of which one lobe extends posteriorly for over half the length of the swim bladder. There is a single simple posterior projection. The ventral surface of the bladder has a narrow duct like process extending to the urogenital opening.

The colour of the body is an olive-yellow dorsally, while paler on the sides and abdomen; the cheeks and part of the operculum are orange-yellow with one or two stripes of orange-yellow running along the sides of the body. The fins are all uniformly greyish, with some presence of dots on the rays of the second dorsal fin.

== Distribution and habitat ==
The known range of Boutan's whiting is known only to include Gulf of Tonkin, and the coast of south east China, although the common confusion with S. sihama may mean it is more widespread but not reported. The species is known to live on inshore silty bottoms, in depths down to 20 m. Nothing else is known of its biology.

== Relationship to humans ==
Boutan's whiting is taken locally along its range and mostly sold fresh in local markets. It has been reported however to be taken by seine nets in Vietnam, forming the basis of an export market in butterflied fillets to Japan. The sillaginid species of much this region are inadequately studied and many fisheries are unmonitored.
