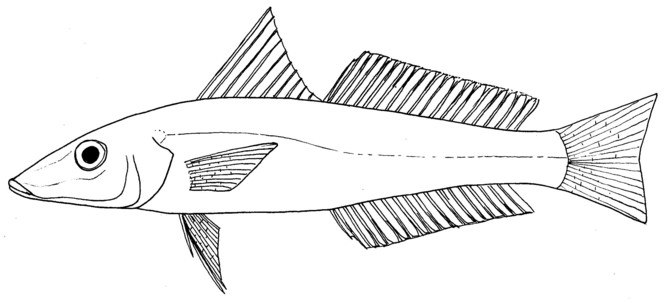

Conservation status
- Data Deficient (IUCN 3.1)

Scientific classification
- Kingdom: Animalia
- Phylum: Chordata
- Class: Actinopterygii
- Order: Acanthuriformes
- Family: Sillaginidae
- Genus: Sillago
- Species: S. indica

Binomial name
- Sillago indica McKay, Dutt & Sujatha, 1985
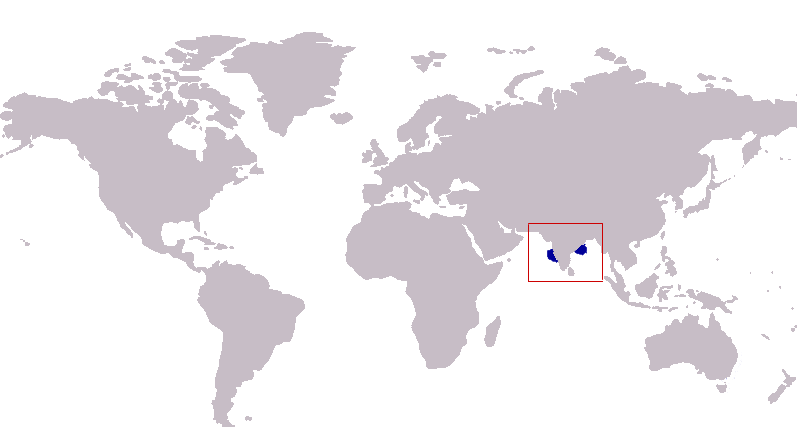
- Range of the Indian sillago

Synonyms
- Sillago parvisquamis Dutt & Sujatha, 1980

= Indian sillago =

Species of fish

Sillago indica, the Indian sillago, is a poorly known species of coastal marine fish of the smelt-whiting family Sillaginidae. The species was named in 1985, having previously being misidentified as another species of Sillago, S. parvisquamis. The Indian sillago inhabits the coasts of the Indian subcontinent and Oman. Like all sillaginids, it is benthic in nature, living in depths to 30 m where it is caught by fishermen alongside other species of Sillago.

== Taxonomy and naming ==
The Indian sillago is one of over 30 species in the genus Sillago, which is one of five genera belonging to the smelt whiting family Sillaginidae, this family was previously considered to be part of the Percoidea, a suborder of the Perciformes. The 5th edition of Fishes of the World classifies the Sillaginidae in the order Spariformes.

The species was first named by McKay in his comprehensive review of the Sillaginidae, with coauthors Dutt and Sujatha contributing the section on S. indica. The species was previously misidentified as Sillago parvisquamis by the latter two authors in earlier publications, with McKay pointing out the only noticeable difference between the two is the swim bladder morphology, as well as an indistinct black band in the side of the fish. For this reason, the fish goes unidentified in most catches, usually referred to as a number of other sillaginids. The species binomial and common name reflects the species geographical distribution, being at the time known from India only.

== Description ==
As with other sillagids, the Indian sillago has an elongate body with a long conical snout, and a long soft dorsal and anal fin. The body is covered in small ctenoid scales extending to the cheek and head. The first dorsal fin has 11 spines and the second dorsal fin has 1 leading spine with 21 to 22 soft rays posterior. The anal fin is similar to the second dorsal fin, but has 2 spines with 22 to 23 soft rays posterior to the spines. Other distinguishing features include 68 to 70 lateral line scales and a total of 34 vertebrae. The species has a known maximum total length of 34 cm.

The swim bladder is quite distinct, having a bifurcate anterior extensions, while the anterolateral extensions are recurved and extend to the ventral duct. There is a single posterior extension.

The colour of the Indian sillago is a light tan with a dark brown—blackish band starting behind the upper part of the opercle and curving down below lateral line for approximately two thirds the length and continuing slightly or directly on the lateral line as a broken band or elongate spots. The head, cheeks, belly and lower sides are covered in a sprinkling of black spots. The interspinous membrane of the first dorsal fin, the individual soft rays and the caudal fin are also spotted, with the caudal fin heavily spotted.

== Distribution and habitat ==
As suggested by its name, the Indian sillago was first known from India. It is now also known from the coast of Oman. The species inhabits inshore coastal waters in a range of depths from 0 to 30 m. Due to its relatively recent naming and difficulty of identification, very little knowledge on the biology of the species has been collected.

== Relationship to humans ==
Like all other species of Sillago, the Indian sillago is taken amongst inshore catches but not distinguished from other sillaginids, with no specific information available on the fishery. It is often taken by drift net, shore seine and cast net by local fisheries, and by mini trawlers.
