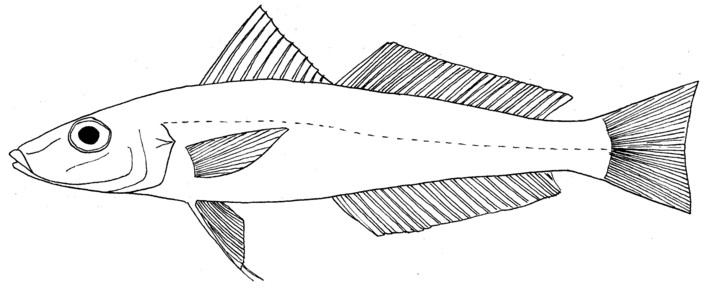

Scientific classification
- Domain: Eukaryota
- Kingdom: Animalia
- Phylum: Chordata
- Class: Actinopterygii
- Order: Acanthuriformes
- Family: Sillaginidae
- Genus: Sillago
- Species: S. lutea

Binomial name
- Sillago lutea McKay, 1985
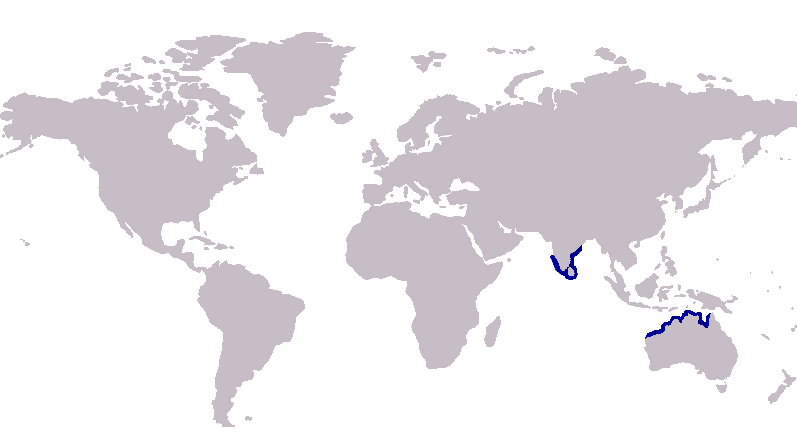
- Range of the mud whiting

= Mud whiting =

Species of fish

The mud whiting (Sillago lutea), or mud sillago, is a species of coastal marine fish in the smelt-whiting family Sillaginidae. The mud whiting was first described in 1985 and is currently known from the north west coast of Australia and the Indian coast.

As its name suggests, mud whiting prefer muddy or silty substrates, and are commonly found in association with the banana prawn. Due to this relationship, Australian prawn trawlers take large quantities of the species, but it is currently not marketed.

== Taxonomy and naming ==
The mud whiting is one of over 30 species in the genus Sillago, which is one of five genera belonging to the smelt whiting family Sillaginidae, this family was previously considered to be part of the Percoidea, a suborder of the Perciformes. The 5th edition of Fishes of the World classifies the Sillaginidae in the order Spariformes.

The species was scientifically examined by Dutt and Sujatha their revision of the sillaginid fishes of India and incorrectly assigned the specimen to the preexisting species Sillago macrolepis. Roland McKay reexamined the species during his revision of the Sillaginidae, determining it to be a new species and naming it Sillago lutea. A specimen collected from Exmouth Gulf in Western Australia was assigned to be the holotype for the species. The binomial name of "lutea" is derived from the Latin meaning "belonging to mud", also reflected in the common name in reference to its preferred habitat.

== Description ==
As with most of the genus Sillago, the mud whiting has a slightly compressed, elongate body tapering toward the terminal mouth. The body is covered in small ctenoid scales extending to the two rows of cheek scales and head. The first dorsal fin has 11 spines and the second dorsal fin has 1 leading spine with 20 to 22 soft rays posterior. The anal fin is similar to the second dorsal fin, but has 2 spines with 21 to 23 soft rays posterior to the spines. Other distinguishing features include 67 to 72 lateral line scales and a total of 33 to 35 vertebrae. The species has a known maximum length of over 16 cm.

The swim bladder is similar to the Japanese whiting, characterised by a short central anterior extension with two anteriorly facing anterolateral projections, which may be well or poorly developed. There is a single median posterior extension. The duct like process on the ventral surface of the swim bladder is present.

The colour of the fish is a light sandy brown above, with a paler brown to white on the underside and a poorly defined silvery mid-lateral band. The scale margins are occasionally slightly darker than the centres, giving a vague mesh-like appearance above the lateral line. All the fins are transparent, the only exception being the spinous dorsal fin which has a dusting of fine black spots. There is no dark spot at the base of the pectoral fin, another feature used to distinguish between sillaginid species.

== Distribution and habitat ==
The mud whiting is known to inhabit two regions, the north west coast of Australia from Exmouth Gulf in Western Australia to the eastern Gulf of Carpentaria and the Arafura Sea, as well as the coasts of India and Sri Lanka.

Mud whiting are commonly associated with the banana prawn, Penaeus merguiensis de Man in northern Australia, and inhabit most muddy or very silty substrates. Mud whiting occur in a range of depths, from 0 to 60 m. The species reaches sexual maturity at 10 cm.

== Relationship to humans ==
Mud whiting are most often taken by trawl nets, with large amounts taken by prawn trawlers but as the species grows to only 16 cm, the catch is of no commercial importance at present. Minor amounts of the fish are also taken by trawlers on the north coast of Australia from the Gulf of Carpentaria to Exmouth Gulf. McKay suggests the species could form the basis of a small bycatch fishery, to be exported ungutted.
