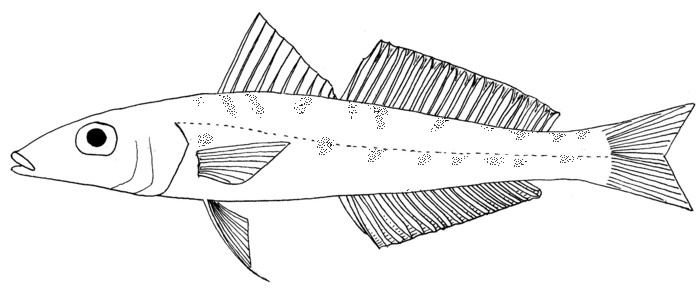

Scientific classification
- Kingdom: Animalia
- Phylum: Chordata
- Class: Actinopterygii
- Order: Acanthuriformes
- Family: Sillaginidae
- Genus: Sillago
- Species: S. intermedia

Binomial name
- Sillago intermedia Wongratana, 1977
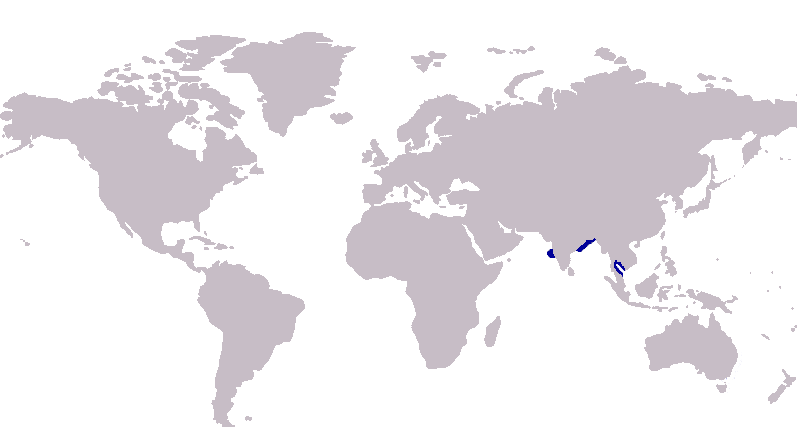
- Range of the Internediate whiting

= Intermediate whiting =

Species of fish

The Intermediate whiting (Sillago intermedia), is a species of coastal marine fish of the smelt-whiting family Sillaginidae. The intermediate whiting ranges from the west coast of India to the Gulf of Thailand in the east, inhabiting silty substrates in shallow waters. First identified in 1977 from a specimen found in a fish market, the species has had little research performed on its biology, and is frequently misidentified as Sillago sihama or Sillago maculata intermediate whiting are commonly caught by fishermen throughout their range and are marketed fresh locally.

== Taxonomy and naming ==
The intermediate whiting is one of over 30 species in the genus Sillago, which is one of five genera belonging to the smelt whiting family Sillaginidae, this family was previously considered to be part of the Percoidea, a suborder of the Perciformes. The 5th edition of Fishes of the World classifies the Sillaginidae in the order Spariformes.

The species was first recognized and named Sillago intermedius by Wongratana in 1977 after a number of unknown sillaginid individuals were found in a Thai fish market whilst Wongratana was collecting specimens of sillaginids to be sent to McKay for his review of the Sillaginidae. He based his description on a specimen taken from the east coast of Thailand in 1977, which was allocated to be the holotype. The species has been subsequently misidentified as Sillago maculata, as the blotches on the species are fairly similar.

== Description ==
As with most of the genus Sillago, the intermediate whiting has a slightly compressed, elongate body tapering toward the terminal mouth. The body is covered in small ctenoid scales extending to the two rows of cheek scales and head. The first dorsal fin has 11 spines and the second dorsal fin has 1 leading spine with 21 to 22 soft rays posterior. The anal fin is similar to the second dorsal fin, but has 2 spines with 21 to 22 soft rays posterior to the spines. Other distinguishing features include 67 to 70 lateral line scales and a total of 34 vertebrae. The species has a known maximum length of 20 cm.

The swim bladder has two anterior extensions which extend forward and diverge before terminating above the auditory capsule. Two lateral extensions commence anteriorly, sending tubules to the anterior and extending below the abdominal wall adjacent to the swimbladder. There are also two posterior extensions which project into the post-coelomic region. The morphology of the swim-bladder is quite similar to S. sihama, but the tubules are very simple, unlike S. sihama which has complexly folded extensions.

The intermediate whiting is a pale silvery colour, being darker on top and lighter below. The top of the snout is blackish, while the opercle, preopercle and preorbital are bright silver. The sides of the body below the lateral line have a longitudinal row of 8 or 9 dark blotches. The back also has a row of dusky blotches. The caudal fin has darker upper and lower rays, with all other fins hyaline in appearance.

== Distribution and habitat ==
As its name suggests, the intermediate whiting occurs predominantly in Thailand where it ranges the Gulf of Thailand, extending westward to the west coast of the Indian subcontinent, apparently having a fairly scattered distribution.

The intermediate whiting is a shallow water, inshore species which inhabits open silty substrates at depths of 0 to 10 m, occasionally entering estuaries. Nothing else known of its biology.

== Relationship to humans ==
Like other sillaginids, the intermediate whiting is taken on a small scale by fishermen throughout its range, where it is sold fresh in local markets. It is often not differentiated form other sillaginids due to its close resemblance to both S. sihama and S. maculata.
