= Large-headed whiting =

Scientific classification
- Domain: Eukaryota
- Kingdom: Animalia
- Phylum: Chordata
- Class: Actinopterygii
- Order: Acanthuriformes
- Family: Sillaginidae
- Genus: Sillago
- Species: S. megacephalus

Binomial name
- Sillago megacephalus S. Y. Lin, 1933
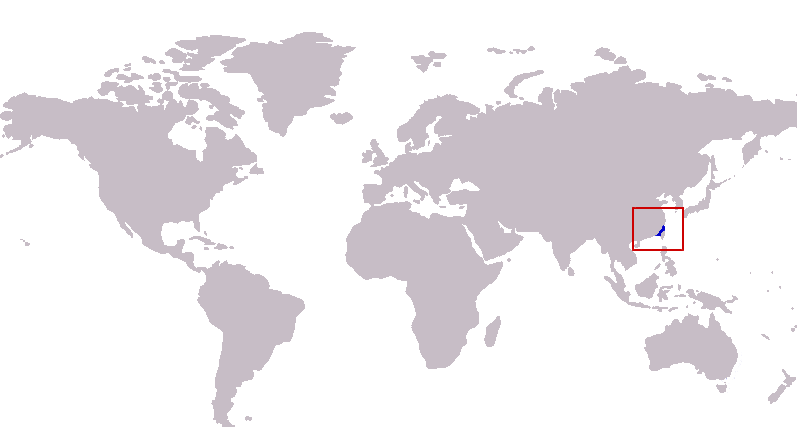
- Range of the large-headed whiting

Species of fish

The large-headed whiting (Sillago megacephalus) is a dubious species of coastal marine fish in the smelt-whiting family that has only been recorded from one specimen captured off the coast of China in 1933. Although very similar to Sillago sihama, the species is characterised by an unusually large head which accounts for 33% of the total body length.

== Taxonomy and naming ==
The large-headed whiting is one of over 30 species in the genus Sillago, which is one of five genera belonging to the smelt whiting family Sillaginidae, this family was previously considered to be part of the Percoidea, a suborder of the Perciformes. The 5th edition of Fishes of the World classifies the Sillaginidae in the order Spariformes.

The only specimen of the species ever recorded was taken from Paoping Harbour in Hainan, China in 1933. Lin recorded the new species, designating the only sample to be the holotype of the species. In preparation of a 1985 review of the sillaginids, Roland McKay was unable to locate the holotype and has presumed it to be lost. McKay noted that based on its description, all features except an unusually large head where characteristic of the common species Sillago sihama, suggesting the S. megacephalus is actually a junior synonym of S. sihama. The common name of 'large-headed whiting' is a straight translation from its binomial name, signifying the diagnostic head length.

== Description ==
As already noted, the large-headed whiting is very similar to Sillago sihama, but has a head length which is 33% of the body length, compared to the 27-30% observed in S. sihama. The first dorsal fin has 11 spines, while the second dorsal fin has a single spine and 22 soft rays. The anal fin is similar with two spines and 23 soft rays. There are about 70 lateral line scales. The colour is uniform all over the body, with only the tip of the spinous dorsal fins black. Little else is known, including swimbladder morphology and vertebrae numbers. The specimen described was 158 mm in length.

== Distribution and habitat ==
The only known specimen of large-headed whiting was taken from Taiwanese waters, with no other records known of, and no information of the habitat or depth the species lives at available. Aspects of the species biology and importance to fisheries are completely unknown at the present.
