= Chinese sillago =

Scientific classification
- Domain: Eukaryota
- Kingdom: Animalia
- Phylum: Chordata
- Class: Actinopterygii
- Order: Acanthuriformes
- Family: Sillaginidae
- Genus: Sillago
- Species: S. sinica

Binomial name
- Sillago sinica T. X. Gao, Ji, J. G. Xiao, T. Q. Xue, Yanagimoto & Setoguma, 2011
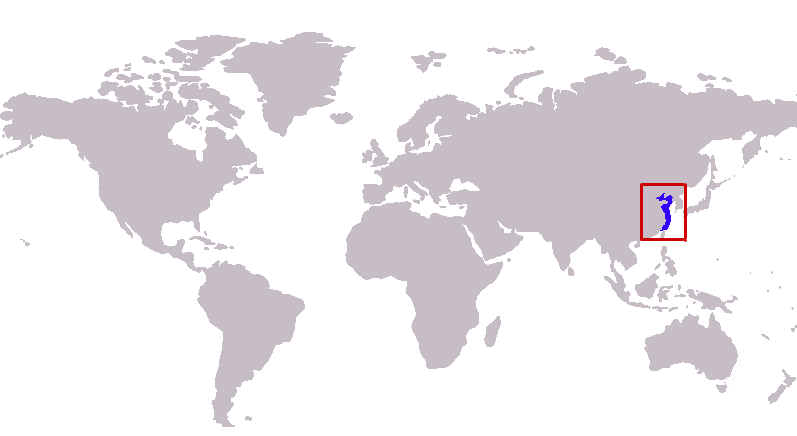
- Range of the Chinese sillago

Species of fish

The Chinese sillago (Sillago sinica) is a species of inshore marine fish in the smelt whiting family Sillaginidae, described in 2011. The species is known only to inhabit the coastal waters of China, primarily in estuarine tidal flats near Wenzhou, Zhejiang Province. The Chinese sillago was described in 2011 based on morphological and DNA barcode analysis of several specimens. Several detailed anatomic features distinguish it from other sillaginids, with Sillago parvisquamis its closest relative based on phylogenetic analysis. Nothing is known of the ecology or importance to fisheries of the Chinese sillago.

== Taxonomy and phylogeny ==
The Chinese sillago is one of over 30 species in the genus Sillago, which is one of five genera belonging to the smelt whiting family Sillaginidae, this family was previously considered to be part of the Percoidea, a suborder of the Perciformes. The 5th edition of Fishes of the World classifies the Sillaginidae in the order Spariformes.

The Chinese sillago was first described by a group of 6 authors in 2011 based on several type specimens collected from various parts of the East China Sea. The designated holotype is from near Wenzhou in the Zhejiang Province. The species specific epithet arises from the Latin word for China.

The authors used the mitochondrial DNA cytochrome oxidase subunit I (COI) gene as a DNA barcode to further justify the assignment of a new species of Sillago. In doing so they also analysed the species position relative to several sillaginids with an overlapping geographic distribution. The results clearly indicated S. sinica was sufficiently genetically distant from other species to be considered a new species. S. parvisquamis is the closest species genetically which correlates with the similar overall morphology of these two species. The authors also demonstrated that the COI gene is a viable method of phylogenetically analysing the Sillaginide.

== Description ==
The Chinese sillago is similar in external appearance to many other members of the genus Sillago, which have a slightly compressed, elongate body tapering toward the terminal mouth. The dorsal fin is in two parts, the first made of feeble spines and the second of soft rays headed by a single feeble spine. The first dorsal fin has either 10 or 11 dorsal spines, a feature unique among Sillago which otherwise have 11 dorsal spines. The second dorsal fin has a single spine followed by 20-22 soft rays, while the anal fin has 2 spines and 21 to 23 soft rays. There are 37 to 39 vertebrae, while the otolith morphology is also distinctive. The body is covered in small ctenoid scales, with the anterior scales larger than the posterior. The pectoral and ventral fin bases both lack scales. The maximum known size of the species is 17.5 cm.

The Chinese sillago grades from a yellowish brown above to a silvery grey on its underside. A weak lateral stripe may be present. The dorsal fins are yellow to hyaline with small dark spots on the first dorsal fin and 3 to 4 rows of dusky spots on the membranes. The remaining fins are yellowish, with the caudal fin becoming dusky and having dark margins.

== Distribution and biology ==
The Chinese sillago is only known from one study which collected all material from the East China Sea, Bohai Sea and Yellow Sea within China. The species is presumed to inhabit tidal flats in estuarine areas. Other areas of the species biology and ecology are unknown, with further study required. The relative importance to fisheries is also unknown, although sillaginids in general are of importance in Chinese waters.
