= Serinibacter salmoneus =

Scientific classification
- Domain: Bacteria
- Kingdom: Bacillati
- Phylum: Actinomycetota
- Class: Actinomycetes
- Order: Micrococcales
- Family: Beutenbergiaceae
- Genus: Serinibacter
- Species: S. salmoneus

Binomial name
- Serinibacter salmoneus Hamada et al. 2009

Type strain
- DSM 21801; Kis4-28; NBRC 104924

Species of bacterium

Sinomonas mesophila is a Gram-positive bacterium from the genus of Sinomonas which has been isolated from the gut of the fish Sillago japonica from Japan.
