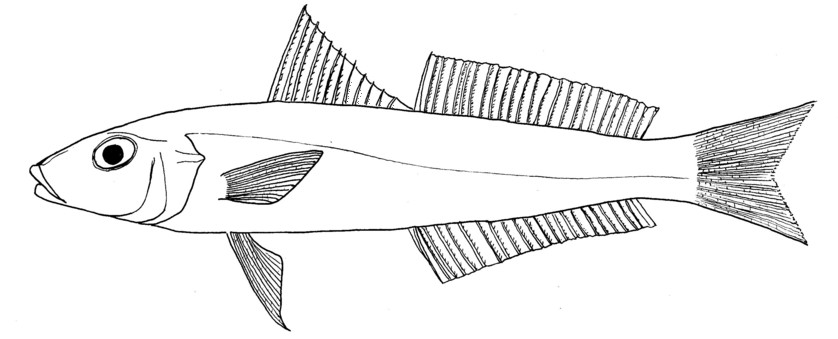

Conservation status
- Least Concern (IUCN 3.1)

Scientific classification
- Kingdom: Animalia
- Phylum: Chordata
- Class: Actinopterygii
- Order: Acanthuriformes
- Family: Sillaginidae
- Genus: Sillago
- Species: S. arabica

Binomial name
- Sillago arabica McKay and McCarthy, 1989
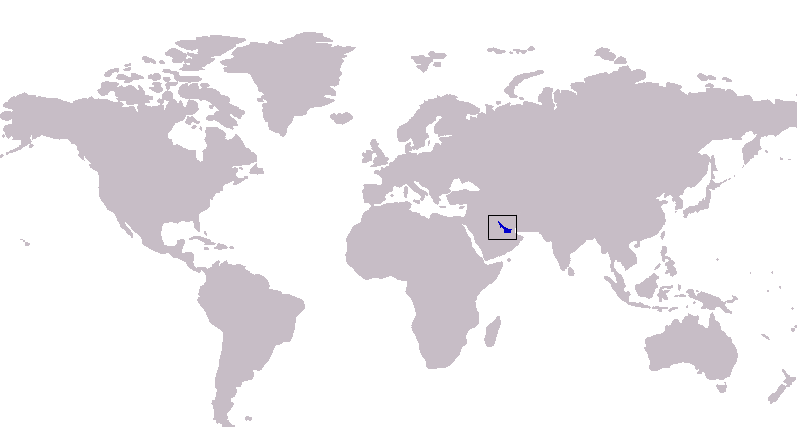
- Range of the Shortnose whiting

= Shortnose whiting =

Species of fish

The shortnose whiting (Sillago arabica) is a poorly known species, described in 1989, of inshore marine fish of the smelt whiting family Sillaginidae that inhabits only the Persian Gulf. S. arabica is similar in morphology to other sillaginids, although has a distinctive shortened snout which gives the species its common name. This species is of no current interest to local fisheries, although beach seines may take minor amounts of this species.

== Taxonomy and naming ==
The shortnose whiting is one of over 30 species in the genus Sillago, which is one of five genera belonging to the smelt whiting family Sillaginidae, this family was previously considered to be part of the Percoidea, a suborder of the Perciformes. The 5th edition of Fishes of the World classifies the Sillaginidae in the order Spariformes.

The species was identified and named Sillago arabica by Roland McKay and L.J. McCarthy in 1989, after examining the holotype which was initially collected in Tanajib Bay in the Persian Gulf during 1982. The authors also termed the common name 'shortnose whiting' for the species, as its uniquely short snout is a key identifying feature in the field.

== Description ==
The shortnose whiting shares the same basic profile as most of the genus Sillago, possessing an elongate, slightly compressed body tapering toward the terminal mouth. The profile of the species is slightly leaner than most of its close relatives, which may be one initial key to field identification. More definitive diagnostic features include the spine and ray count of the dorsal and anal fins as well as the morphology of the swim bladder. The first dorsal fin consists of 12 or 13 spines, while the second dorsal fin has one spine and 22 to 24 soft rays posterior to the spine. The anal fin is similar to the second dorsal fin with 2 spines followed by 22 to 24 soft rays. The species has 75 to 80 lateral line scales and a total of 38 to 40 vertebrae, also diagnostic features. The species is one of the smaller whitings, growing only to a maximum length of 15 cm overall. The swim bladder of S. arabica has no anterior extensions and a single posterior extension. The anterior margin of the organ is slightly rounded, while a duct like tubular process extends from the ventral surface to the urogenital opening.

The species has pale sandy brown colour overall, with a slightly paler belly and slightly darker upper operculum. There are no dark blotches present on the side of the fish, while the first and second dorsal fins and caudal fin are dusted with black.

== Distribution and habitat ==
The shortnose whiting is entirely restricted to the Persian Gulf, where it inhabits the shallow coastal waters out to a depth of 5m. The species is often caught in seine nets along beaches in the Persian Gulf, although no fishery exists for the species. As mentioned previously, the species has had very little data collected on it, with the initial description by McKay and McCarthy in 1989 the only major study on the species.
