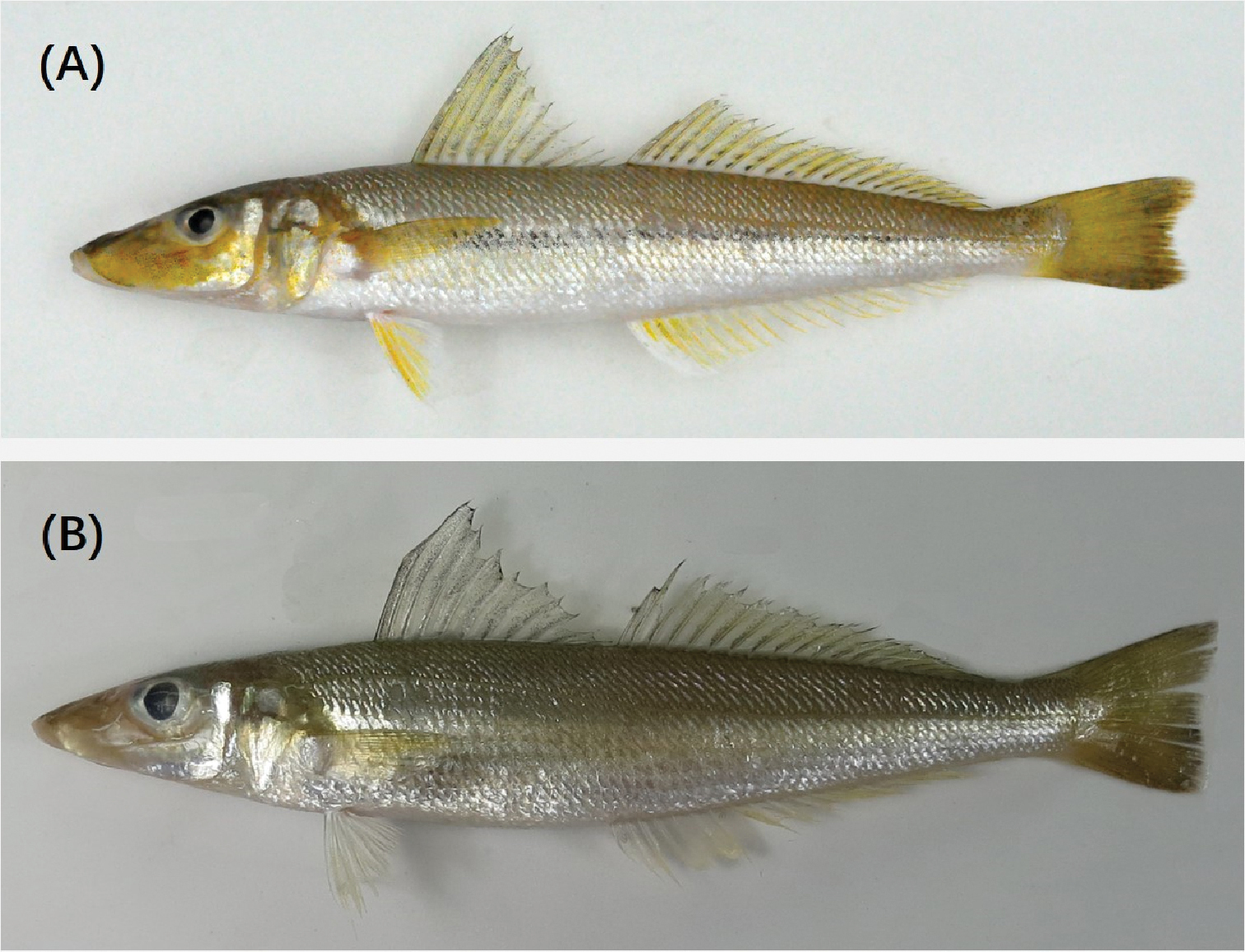

Scientific classification
- Kingdom: Animalia
- Phylum: Chordata
- Class: Actinopterygii
- Order: Acanthuriformes
- Family: Sillaginidae
- Genus: Sillago
- Species: S. nigrofasciata

Binomial name
- Sillago nigrofasciata J. G. Xiao, Zheng-Sen Yu, Na Song & T. X. Gao, 2021

= Black-banded sillago =

Species of fish

The black-banded sillago (Sillago nigrofasciata) is a species of marine ray-finned fish belonging to the family Sillaginidae, the smelt-whitings or sillagos. This species is found in the western Pacific Ocean.

== Taxonomy ==
The black-banded sillago was first formally described in 2021 by Xiao Jia-Guang, Zheng-Sen Yu, Na Song and Gao Tian-Xiang with its type locality given as the coastal area of Fuding in Fujian Province of China. This species is classified within the nominate subgenus of the genus Sillago. This genus is one of five genera belonging to the smelt whiting family Sillaginidae, this family was previously considered to be part of the Percoidea, a suborder of the Perciformes. The 5th edition of Fishes of the World classifies the Sillaginidae in the order Spariformes.

== Etymology ==
The black-banded sillago has the specific name nigrofasciata which means "black-banded".

== Description ==
The black-banded sillago differs from related species by its comparatively large body with a large, long snouted head. The eye is of medium size, its edge is partially covered by an adipose eyelid and the area between the eyes is flat. The small, terminal mouth has a band of small canine-like teeth in the both jaws and three or four rows of canine-like vomerine teeth. There are two dorsal fins, the first contains between 10 and 12 spines and is higher than the second dorsal fin. The second dorsal fin is long based and has a single spine and between 20 and 22 soft rays. The anal fin has 2 spines and between 20 and 22 soft rays. The upper head is dark brown and the anterior body is paler and this fades to silver on the lower body. The upper snout is brownish-grey and the cheek is yellow becoming silver tontet to its rear. There is a patch of black spots in front of and below the eyes. There is a black, horizontal stripe, made up of minute black spots running along the flank between the operculum to the caudal peduncle. The fins are spotted on the membranes and the caudal fin is dusky-yellow with a black margin and greyish brown along its rear margin. The caudal fin lobes usually widely truncated to the rear. A distinguishing feature of this species is its large swim bladder with two uniquely shaped rear pointing projection from its posterior part. The largest total length is 188 mm (7.4 in).

== Distribution and habitat ==
The black-banded sillago is only known to occur along the southern coasts of China in the South China Sea and the Taiwan Strait where it is common on sand bars, beaches and in mangroves in areas with sandy substrates at depths between 0 and 20 m (0 and 66 ft). It often spends long periods of time in estuaries.
