= Serinibacter tropicus =

Scientific classification
- Domain: Bacteria
- Kingdom: Bacillati
- Phylum: Actinomycetota
- Class: Actinomycetes
- Order: Micrococcales
- Family: Beutenbergiaceae
- Genus: Serinibacter
- Species: S. tropicus

Binomial name
- Serinibacter tropicus Hamada et al. 2015

Type strain
- InaCC A 515; NBRC 110108; PS-14-7

Species of bacterium

Sinomonas tropicus is a Gram-positive bacterium from the genus of Sinomonas which has been isolated from the rhizosphere of a mangrove from Pramuka Island in Indonesia.
