= Wattsia =

Conservation status
- Least Concern (IUCN 3.1)

Scientific classification
- Kingdom: Animalia
- Phylum: Chordata
- Class: Actinopterygii
- Order: Acanthuriformes
- Family: Lethrinidae
- Genus: Wattsia; W. L. Y. Chan & Chilvers, 1974
- Species: W. mossambica

Binomial name
- Wattsia mossambica (J. L. B. Smith, 1957)

Synonyms
- Gnathodentex mossambicus J. L. B. Smith, 1957

Genus of fishes

Wattsia is a monospecific genus of marine ray-finned fish belonging to the family Lethrinidae, the emperors and emperor breams. The only species in the genus is Wattsia mossambica, the Mozambique large-eye bream or Mozambique sea bream of the Indian and Western Pacific Oceans.

== Taxonomy ==
Wattsia was first proposed as a monospecific genus by W. L. Y. Chan and Roy M. Chilvers in 1972, the only species they included in the new genus was Gnathodentex mossambicus. G. mossambicus had been first formally described in 1957 by the South African ichthyologist James Leonard Brierley Smith with its type locality given as Pinda in Mozambique. Some authors place this taxon in the subfamily Monotaxinae but the 5th edition of Fishes of the World does not recognise the subfamilies traditionally accepted within the family Lethrinidae as valid. The family Lethrinidae is classified by the 5th edition of Fishes of the World as belonging to the order Spariformes.

== Etymology ==
Wattsia, the generic name, means "belonging to Watts" and honours J. C. D. Watts, a hydrographer with the Fisheries Research Station in Hong Kong from 1969-1972. The specific name refers to the type locality.

== Description ==
Wattsia has a deep, approximately rhombus shaped body with its depth being about half of its standard length. The dorsal fin is supported by 10 spines and 10 soft rays with the anal fin having 3 spines and 10 soft rays. The inner axil of the pectoral fin has no scales. The teeth in the jaws are arranged as a single, thin band of bristle-like teeth with an outer row of conival teeth and there are 4 moderate sized canine-like teeth in the front of the upper jaw and six in the lower jaw. The maxilla has a horizontal serrated ridge on its outer surface. The caudal fin is forked with the tips of the lobes being rounded. The colour of this fish is a yellowish hued silvery grey, with some vague bars and blotches sometimes apparent. The lips and fins are yellow, the fins sometimes having brown spots. There is a black bar on the base of the pectoral fin. This species has a maximum published total length of 55 cm (22 in), although 35 cm (14 in) is more typical.

== Distribution and habitat ==
Wattsia is found from the eastern African coast off Mozambique, the Seychelles, Maldives and Sri Lanka and into the Pacific Ocean east to Fiji and north to Japan, south to Australia. It is found on the outer limit of the continental shelf at depths between 100 and 180 m (330 and 590 ft), and has been caught at 290 m (950 ft).

== Fisheries ==
Wattsia is fished for wherever it occurs, mainly by longlining and bottom trawling, as well as handlining over deep slopes. It makes up more than 50% of the Lethrinidae landed in Melanesia.
