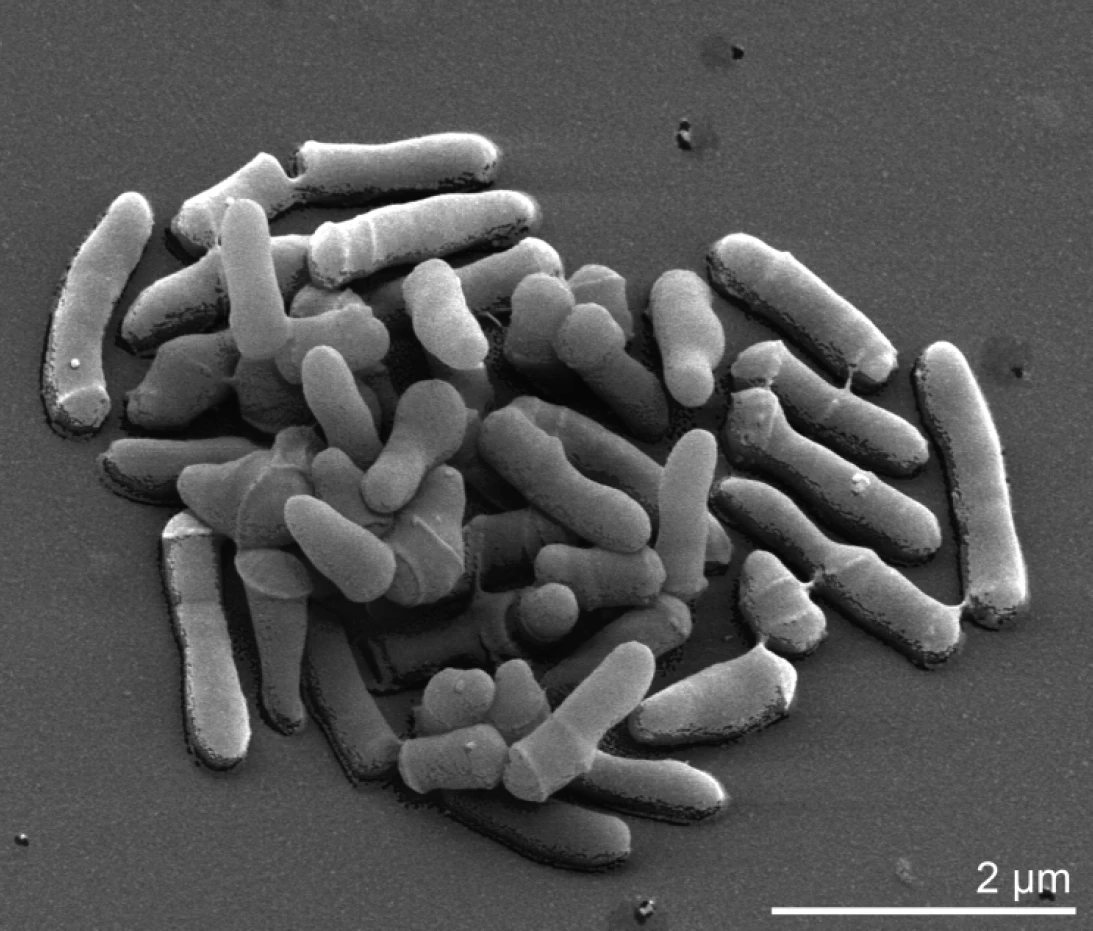

Scientific classification
- Domain: Bacteria
- Kingdom: Bacillati
- Phylum: Actinomycetota
- Class: Actinomycetes
- Order: Micrococcales
- Family: Beutenbergiaceae
- Genus: Beutenbergia; Groth et al. 1999
- Species: B. cavernae

Binomial name
- Beutenbergia cavernae Groth et al. 1999

Type strain
- ATCC BAA-8; CCUG 43141; CIP 106362; DSM 12333; HKI 122; IFO 16432; JCM 11478; NBRC 16432

= Beutenbergia cavernae =

Species of bacteria

Beutenbergia cavernae type strain HKI 0122T

Beutenbergia cavernae is a Gram-positive, non-spore-forming and non-motile species of bacteria from the family of Beutenbergiaceae.

== Habitation and distribution ==
Beutenbergia cavernae has been isolated from soil from the Reed Flute Cave in Guilin in China.
