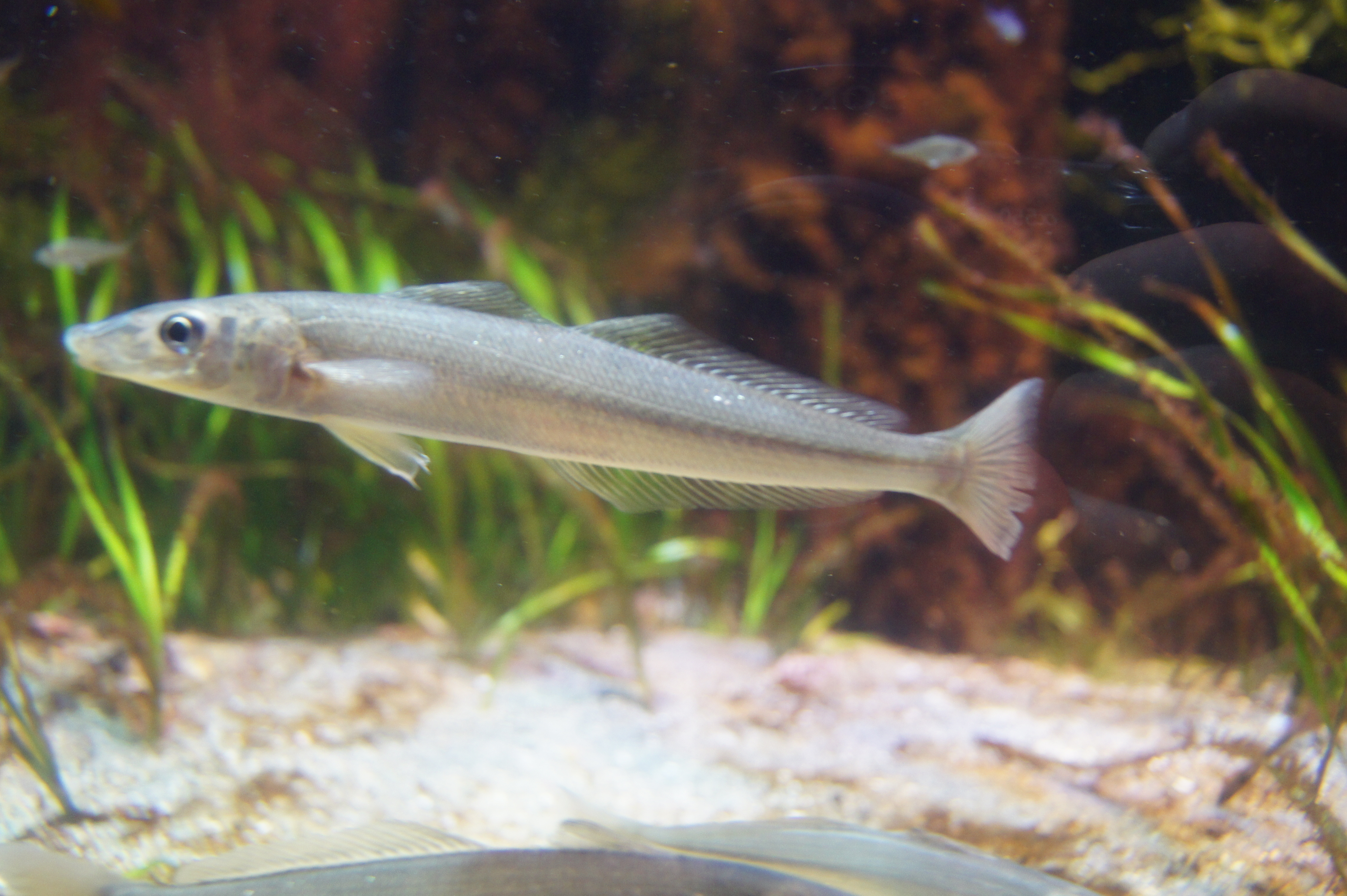

Conservation status
- Endangered (IUCN 3.1)

Scientific classification
- Kingdom: Animalia
- Phylum: Chordata
- Class: Actinopterygii
- Order: Acanthuriformes
- Family: Sillaginidae
- Genus: Sillago
- Species: S. parvisquamis

Binomial name
- Sillago parvisquamis Gill, 1861
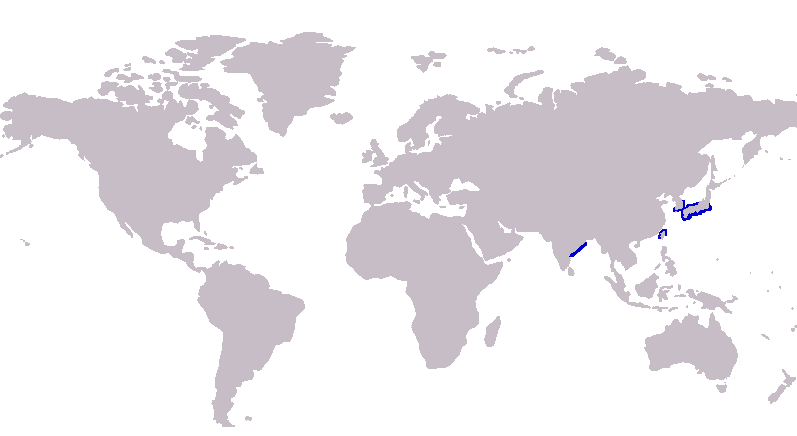
- Approximate range of the small-scale whiting

= Small-scale whiting =

Species of fish

The small-scale whiting (Sillago parvisquamis), also known as the blue whiting, is a species of inshore marine fish of the smelt-whiting family Sillaginidae. The small-scale whiting is very similar in body shape and colour to other species in the genus Sillago, but is distinguished by having 12 or 13 spines in the first dorsal fin compared to 11 in all other species. The species is distributed through parts of the west Pacific Ocean including Japan, Taiwan, Korea and India, inhabiting the tidal flats of major estuaries. It is a benthic predator taking crustaceans, molluscs and annelids. Spawning in the species takes place from May to September, with peaks identified in June and July. The eggs and larvae have been extensively studied in order to distinguish them from the more abundant Sillago sihama. Minor fisheries exist for the small-scale whiting, although it is thought be endangered by habitat loss and pollutionIUCN.

== Taxonomy and naming ==
The small-scale whiting is one of over 30 species in the genus Sillago, which is one of five genera belonging to the smelt whiting family Sillaginidae, this family was previously considered to be part of the Percoidea, a suborder of the Perciformes. The 5th edition of Fishes of the World classifies the Sillaginidae in the order Spariformes.

The species was first scientifically described by Theodore Gill in 1861 in the first review of the sillaginid fishes; "Synopsis of the Sillaginoids". The type specimen was taken from the waters of Kanagawa, near Yokohama in Japan. There has only been one formal misidentification, made by Peter Forsskål in 1913 when he mistook the species for Sillago sihama. The name "small-scale whiting" is in reference to the species' smaller than average scales amongst the genus Sillago.

== Description ==
The small-scale whiting is very similar in external appearance to many other members of the genus Sillago, which have a slightly compressed, elongate body tapering toward the terminal mouth. The dorsal fin is in two parts, the first made of feeble spines and the second of soft rays headed by a single feeble spine. The first dorsal fin has either 12 or 13 dorsal spines, a feature unique among Sillago which otherwise have 11 dorsal spines. The second dorsal fin has a single spine followed by 20 to 22 soft rays, while the anal fin has 2 spines and 22 or 24 soft rays. Other distinguishing features include 79 to 84 lateral line scales and 39 to 40 vertebrae, while the swimbladder morphology also is a highly distinguishing feature. The maximum known size of the species is 30 cm.

The swimbladder has two anterior extensions that arise medially, diverge and terminate. Two lateral extensions appear anteriorally, each with a blind tubule which curves to the abdominal walls and becomes a complex network of blind tubules. There are two posterior tapering extensions that project into and terminate into the caudal region. A duct like process is present from the lateral surface to the urogenital opening. This configuration is very similar to S. sihama, except that the lateral tubules are more complex than in S. sihama.

The small-scale whiting is a pale brown to dull brown colour above and lighter below with a faint mid-lateral band normally present. The fins are all hyaline in appearance except for the dorsal fin which becomes dusky terminally with 5 or 6 rows of dusky spots on the soft dorsal fin membrane.

== Distribution and habitat ==
The small-scale whiting occupies a fairly restricted range in the northwest Pacific Ocean consisting of southern Japan, Taiwan, Korea and India. In Japan the species is known from the southern half of the island chain below Tokyo in the west and Yokohama in the east. The species is rare in both Korea and India, with only a single reported capture of the species in these countries. The species inhabits waters from 0 to 30 m in depth, often found on well developed tidal flats in the estuaries of large rivers. The larvae and juveniles of the species commonly inhabit these environments also, with juveniles often inhabiting the shallowest parts of the tidal flats.

== Biology ==
Like other sillaginids, S. parvisquamis is a benthic predator and is known to consume a variety of crustaceans, molluscs and annelid worms. Studies in the Buzen Sea of Japan have found the small-scale whiting spawns from May to July, while laboratory studies have similarly found that spawning occurs from May to September with a peak from June to July. Laboratory conditions also showed that spawning occurs at night predominantly between 20:30 and 22:00 hours. The eggs are buoyant and spherical in shape with an average diameter of 0.71 mm and are transparent and colourless. Larval and juvenile development has been extensively described by Imoto and Matsui (2000), with a number of characteristics including higher numbers of myomeres and melanophores on the dorsal surface of the body as well as a lack of a vertical band of melanophores on the caudal peduncle distinguishing the larvae from those of S. japonica. Modelling based on growth observations in the species suggests the female starts life smaller than the male but grows faster and is larger than the male within two years. The models put forward by Imoto et al. in 1997 also suggest that the male reaches a maximum of 288 mm while the female reaches 332 mm, assuming their life span is long enough for these theoretical maxima to be reached.

== Relationship to humans ==
Like many species of Sillago in the Asian region, S. parvisquamis is commonly taken in seines from beaches and estuaries but often suffers the same fate of other lesser known sillaginids in being confused with S. sihama. This identification issue, as well as the fact that fisheries statistics are poor or non-existent in such countries means catch statistics are not available. In a 1984 review of the Japanese sillaginids, Sano and Mochizuchi described the species as being endangered due to habitat destruction and pollution, a statement echoed in a number of other papers since, although the IUCN does not recognise the species as being in danger. The discovery of the species in Korea in 1996 suggests its range may be greater than previously supposed, and thus less in danger of extinction than proposed by Sano and Mochizuchi. The flesh is held in high regard in Japan, but is still considered inferior to that of S. japonica. For this reason, McKay proposed in 1992 that the species is possibly a candidate for aquaculture, although such a move has not yet been made.
