= Miniimonas arenae =

Scientific classification
- Domain: Bacteria
- Kingdom: Bacillati
- Phylum: Actinomycetota
- Class: Actinomycetes
- Order: Micrococcales
- Family: Beutenbergiaceae
- Genus: Miniimonas; Ue et al. 2011
- Species: M. arenae

Binomial name
- Miniimonas arenae Ue et al. 2011

Type strain
- KCTC 19750; MBIC 08348; NBRC 106267; YM18-15

Species of bacteria

Miniimonas is a Gram-positive, rod-shaped and non-motile genus of bacteria from the family of Beutenbergiaceae, which has been isolated from sea sand.
