= Salana multivorans =

Scientific classification
- Domain: Bacteria
- Kingdom: Bacillati
- Phylum: Actinomycetota
- Class: Actinomycetes
- Order: Micrococcales
- Family: Beutenbergiaceae
- Genus: Salana von Wintzingerode et al. 2001
- Species: S. multivorans

Binomial name
- Salana multivorans von Wintzingerode et al. 2001

Type strain
- DSM 13521; JCM 13524; NRRL B-24118; Se-3111

Species of bacteria

Salana multivorans is a Gram-positive and facultatively anaerobic species of bacteria that has been isolated from sediments from the river Saale in Germany.
