= Louis Boutan =

French biologist, photographer and zoologist

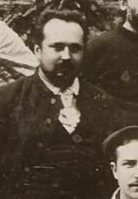
- Boutan in 1896.
- Born: 6 March 1859; Versailles, France
- Died: 6 April 1934 (aged 75); Tigzirt, Algeria
- Occupations: biologist, photographer

Louis Marie-Auguste Boutan (6 March 1859 – 6 April 1934) was a French biologist and photographer. He was a pioneer in the field of underwater photography.

== Early life ==
The son of Augustin Boutan, he was born in Versailles and studied biology and natural history at the University of Paris.

== Career ==
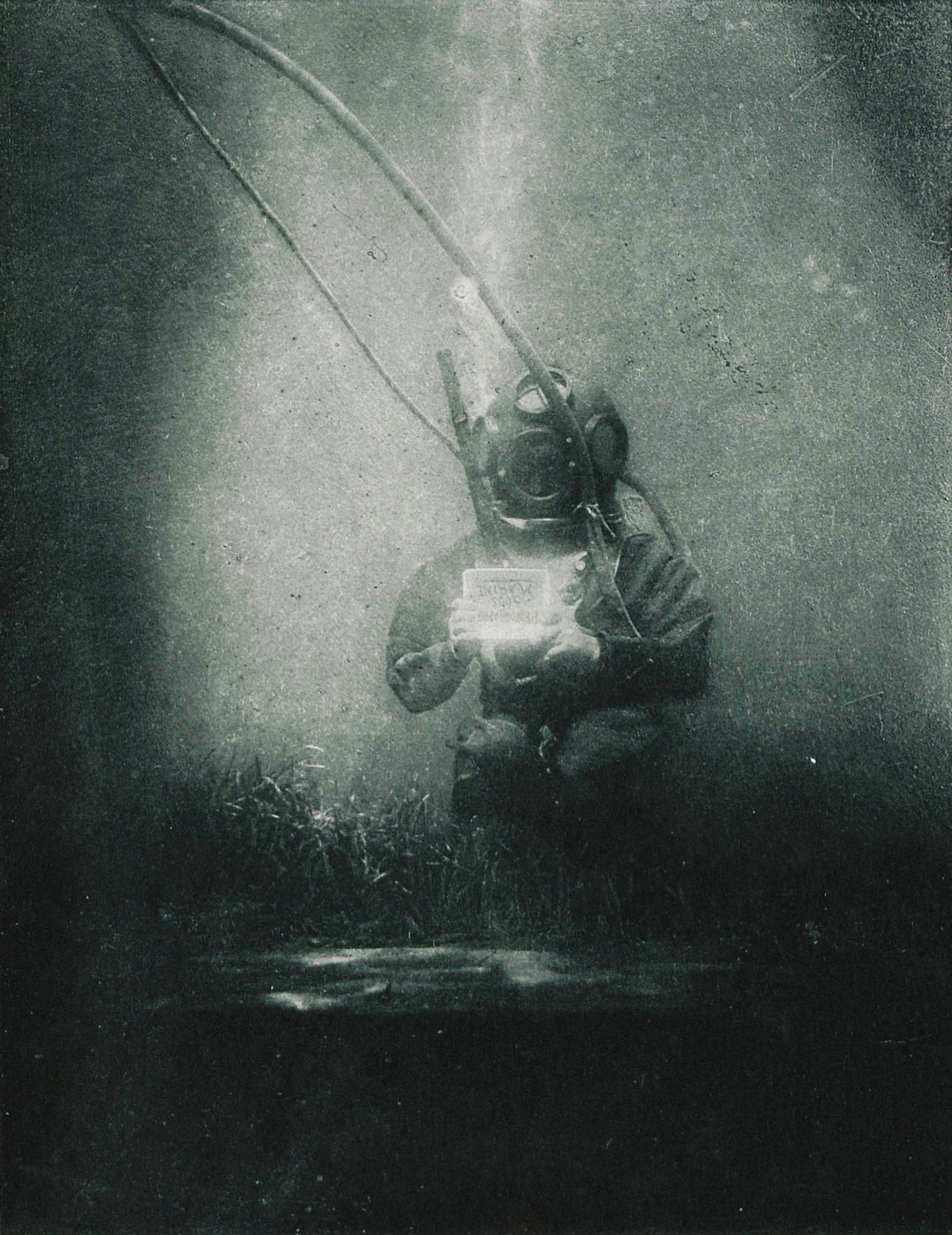
Mechanic Joseph David photographed by Louis Boutan.

In 1880, he was named deputy head assigned to organize the French exhibit at the Melbourne International Exhibition (1880). He stayed in Australia for 18 months, travelling the continent and identifying new animal species. In 1886, Boutan was named maître de conférences at the University of Lille. In the same year, he learned how to dive. In 1893, he was named professor at the Laboratoire Arago. During that year, with his brother Auguste, he developed equipment for underwater photography. In an article in The Century Illustrated Monthly Magazine, he described his apparatus; the article included an illustration of one of his cameras and several underwater images. Boutan developed a flash bulb that could be used underwater. He later used carbon arc lights for illumination.

In 1898, he published the first book on underwater photography La Photographie sous-marine et les progrès de la photographie. Slides of his underwater photographs were shown at the 1900 Exposition Universelle in Paris.

In 1904, he was sent to Hanoi to investigate improvements to rice and the culture of pearl oysters. He returned to France in 1908. In 1910, he was named professor of zoology and animal physiology at the University of Bordeaux. In 1914 and 1916, Boutan and his brother worked on a diving suit for the French army. After the war, he began research into the artificial production of pearls, one of the first people to investigate this subject. In 1921, he was named director of the Station Biologique d'Arcachon. In 1924, he was named to the chair of general zoology of the faculty of science at the University of Algiers; he was also named director of the Station d'Aquaculture et de Pêches de Castiglione and inspector for the Algerian fisheries.

== Later life ==
In 1929, he retired to Tigzirt in Algeria. He died there at the age of 75.

== Legacy ==
The fish Boutan's whiting Sillago boutani Pellegrin, 1905 is named after him.

Boutan was named to the International Scuba Diving Hall of Fame as an early pioneer in 2010.
