= Sillago shaoi =

Scientific classification
- Domain: Eukaryota
- Kingdom: Animalia
- Phylum: Chordata
- Class: Actinopterygii
- Order: Acanthuriformes
- Family: Sillaginidae
- Genus: Sillago
- Species: S. shaoi

Binomial name
- Sillago shaoi T. X. Gao & J. G. Xiao, 2016

Species of ray-finned fish

Sillago shaoi is a species of marine ray-finned fish in the smelt-whiting family Sillaginidae. It is found in the western Pacific Ocean, in the Taiwan Strait between Taiwan and China.

== Entomology ==
The fish is named in honor of ichthyologist Kwang-Tsao Shao (b. 1951), of the National Taiwan Ocean University.
