= Serinibacter =

Scientific classification
- Domain: Bacteria
- Kingdom: Bacillati
- Phylum: Actinomycetota
- Class: Actinomycetes
- Order: Micrococcales
- Family: Beutenbergiaceae
- Genus: Serinibacter; Hamada et al. 2009

Type species
- Serinibacter salmoneus Hamada et al. 2009

Species
- S. arcticus Filippova et al. 2020; S. salmoneus Hamada et al. 2009; S. tropicus Hamada et al. 2015

Genus of bacteria

Serinibacter is a Gram-positive, non-spore-forming and non-motile genus of bacteria from the family Beutenbergiaceae.
