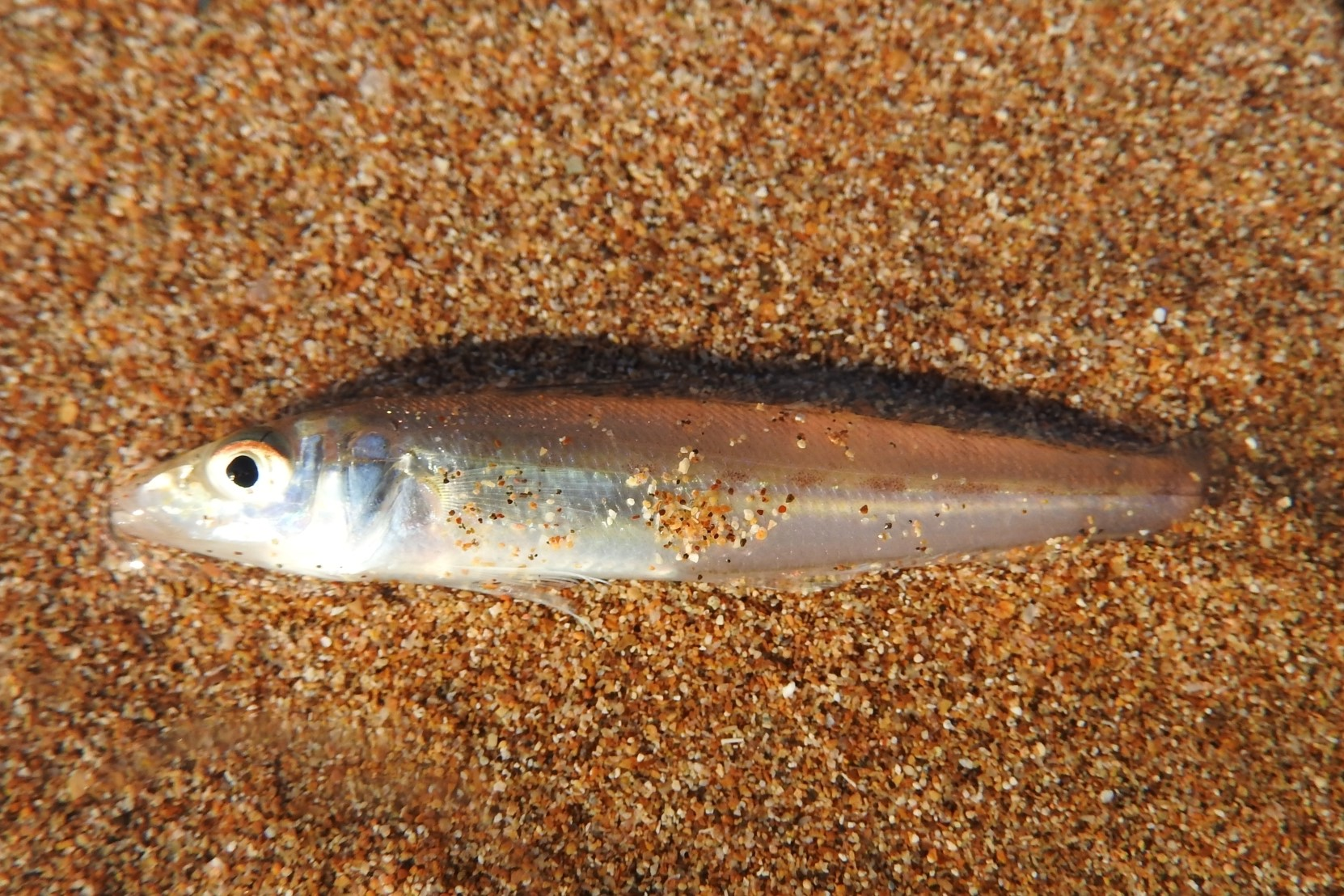

Scientific classification
- Kingdom: Animalia
- Phylum: Chordata
- Class: Actinopterygii
- Order: Acanthuriformes
- Family: Sillaginidae
- Genus: Sillago
- Species: S. suezensis

Binomial name
- Sillago suezensis Golani, R. Fricke & Tikochinski, 2013

= Sillago suezensis =

Species of ray-finned fish

Sillago suezensis is a species of marine ray-finned fish in the smelt-whiting family Sillaginidae. It is found in the western Indian Ocean and the northern Red Sea, including the Gulf of Suez. Following its first record in the Mediterranean Sea, off Lebanon in 1977, it experienced a population explosion in Levantine waters, where it is now very common and has spread as far as the Aegean Sea.

== Description ==
Sillago suezensis reaches a standard length of 18.5 cm (7.3 in).
