= Beutenbergiaceae =

Scientific classification
- Domain: Bacteria
- Kingdom: Bacillati
- Phylum: Actinomycetota
- Class: Actinomycetes
- Order: Micrococcales
- Family: Beutenbergiaceae; Zhi et al. 2009

Type genus
- Beutenbergia Groth et al. 1999

Genera
- Beutenbergia Groth et al. 1999; Litorihabitans Hamada et al. 2019; Miniimonas Ue et al. 2011; Salana von Wintzingerode et al. 2001; Serinibacter Hamada et al. 2009

Family of bacteria

Beutenbergiaceae is an Actinomycete family.

== Phylogeny ==
The currently accepted taxonomy is based on the List of Prokaryotic names with Standing in Nomenclature (LPSN) and National Center for Biotechnology Information (NCBI) and the phylogeny is based on 16S rRNA-based LTP release 106 by The All-Species Living Tree Project:

- - Beutenbergiaceae
    - Beutenbergia
    - - Salana
      - - Miniimonas
        - Serinibacter
  - Bogoriellaceae (outgroup)
