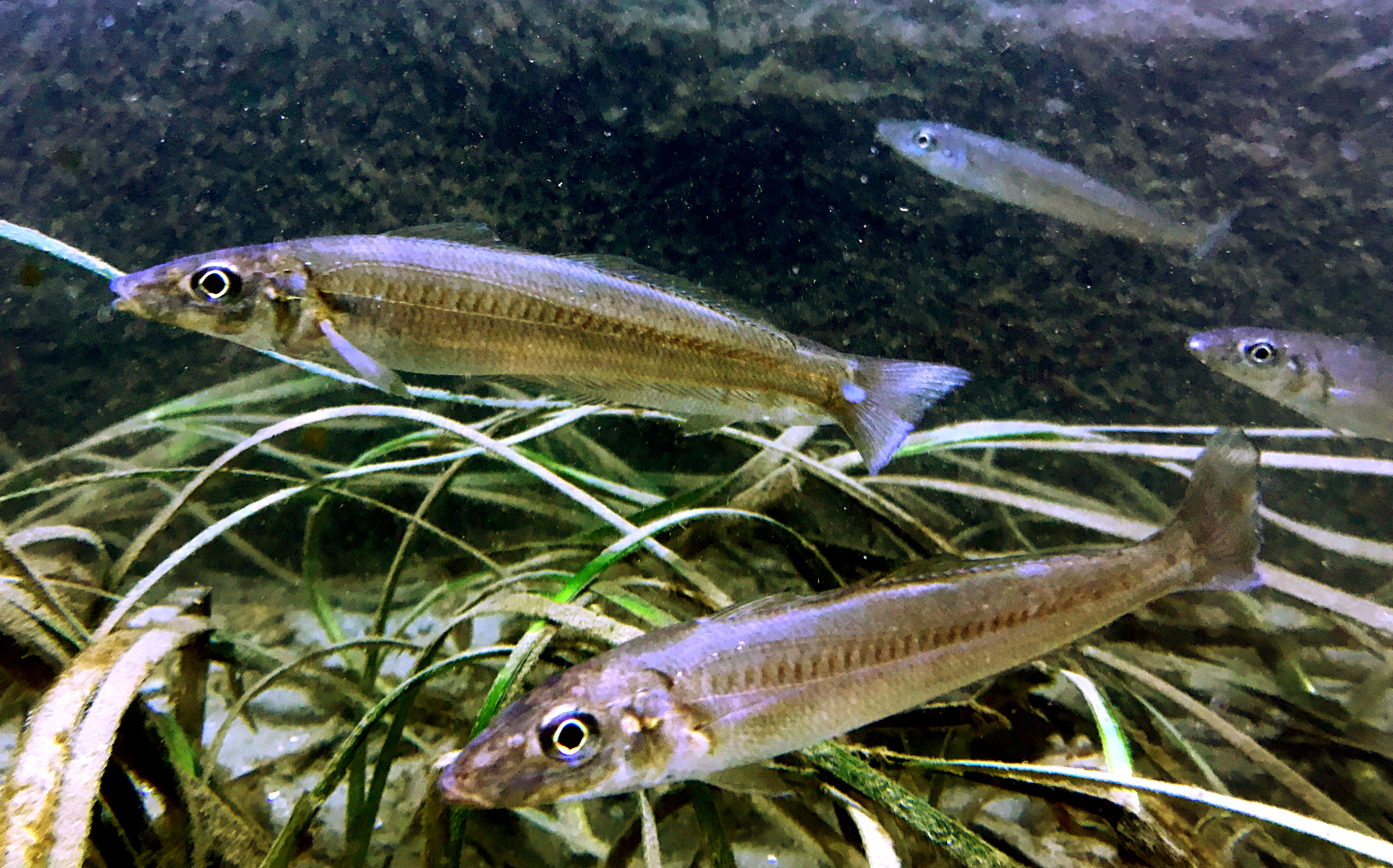

Conservation status
- Least Concern (IUCN 3.1)

Scientific classification
- Kingdom: Animalia
- Phylum: Chordata
- Class: Actinopterygii
- Order: Acanthuriformes
- Family: Sillaginidae
- Genus: Sillago
- Species: S. japonica

Binomial name
- Sillago japonica Temminck and Schlegel, 1843
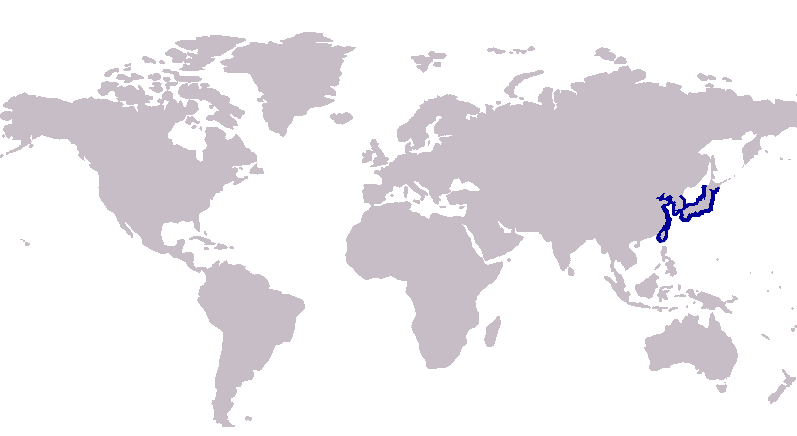
- Range of the Japanese whiting

= Japanese whiting =

Species of fish

The Japanese whiting (Sillago japonica), also known as the Japanese sillago or Shiro-gisu, is a common species of coastal marine fish belonging to the smelt-whiting family, Sillaginidae. As suggested by its name, the Japanese whiting was first recorded from Japan in 1843, but has subsequently been found to extend to Korea, China and Taiwan.

The species inhabits a variety of shallow water habitats where it preys on a variety of crustaceans as well as polychaetes, bivalves and small fish. They spawn between June and October, and are taken in large quantities during this period by fishermen. Being one of the most abundant species of fish around Japan, they make up a large percentage of the commercial catch.

== Taxonomy and naming ==
The Japanese whiting is one of over 30 species in the genus Sillago, which is one of five genera belonging to the smelt whiting family Sillaginidae, this family was previously considered to be part of the Percoidea, a suborder of the Perciformes. The 5th edition of Fishes of the World classifies the Sillaginidae in the order Spariformes.

The species was first recognized and scientifically described by Temminck and Schlegel in 1843 based on a holotype taken somewhere along the Japanese coast. The species has often been mistaken for Sillago sihama, and erroneously been published under this name by a number of authors, the first being Steindachner and Döderlein in 1885. Studies into various aspects of the Japanese whiting's biology have also been incorrectly named as studies on S. sihama.

The binomial and common name of the species refers to the country where the species was first described from; Japan, although its range has subsequently found to be much wider than just Japan. The species is locally known as Shiro-gisu in Japan and Chin-Sa-Suo in China.

== Description ==
As with most of the genus Sillago, the Japanese whiting has a slightly compressed, elongate body tapering toward the terminal mouth. The body is covered in small ctenoid scales extending to the two rows of cheek scales and head. The first dorsal fin has 11 spines and the second dorsal fin has 1 leading spine with 21 to 23 soft rays posterior. The anal fin is similar to the second dorsal fin, but has 2 spines with 22 to 24 soft rays posterior to the spines. Other distinguishing features include 70 to 73 lateral line scales and a total of 35 vertebrae. The species has a known maximum length of over 30 cm (11.8 in) .

Like all species of sillaginid, the swim bladder is the most dependable diagnostic feature. Japanese whiting have a swim bladder characterised by a single, long posterior extension which tapers to a slender point. The anterior end of the organ has three long median projections, with the central extension the longest.

The colour of the fish is a greenish grey above with the dorsal region of the head darker and whitish on the underside of the fish. The anterior and posterior dorsal fins are hyaline, with the first few membranes of the spinous dorsal fin dusted in tiny brown spots. The anal, ventral and pectoral fins are also hyaline, with the pectoral having a greenish upper margin and base. The caudal fin is whitish with dark margins.

== Distribution and habitat ==
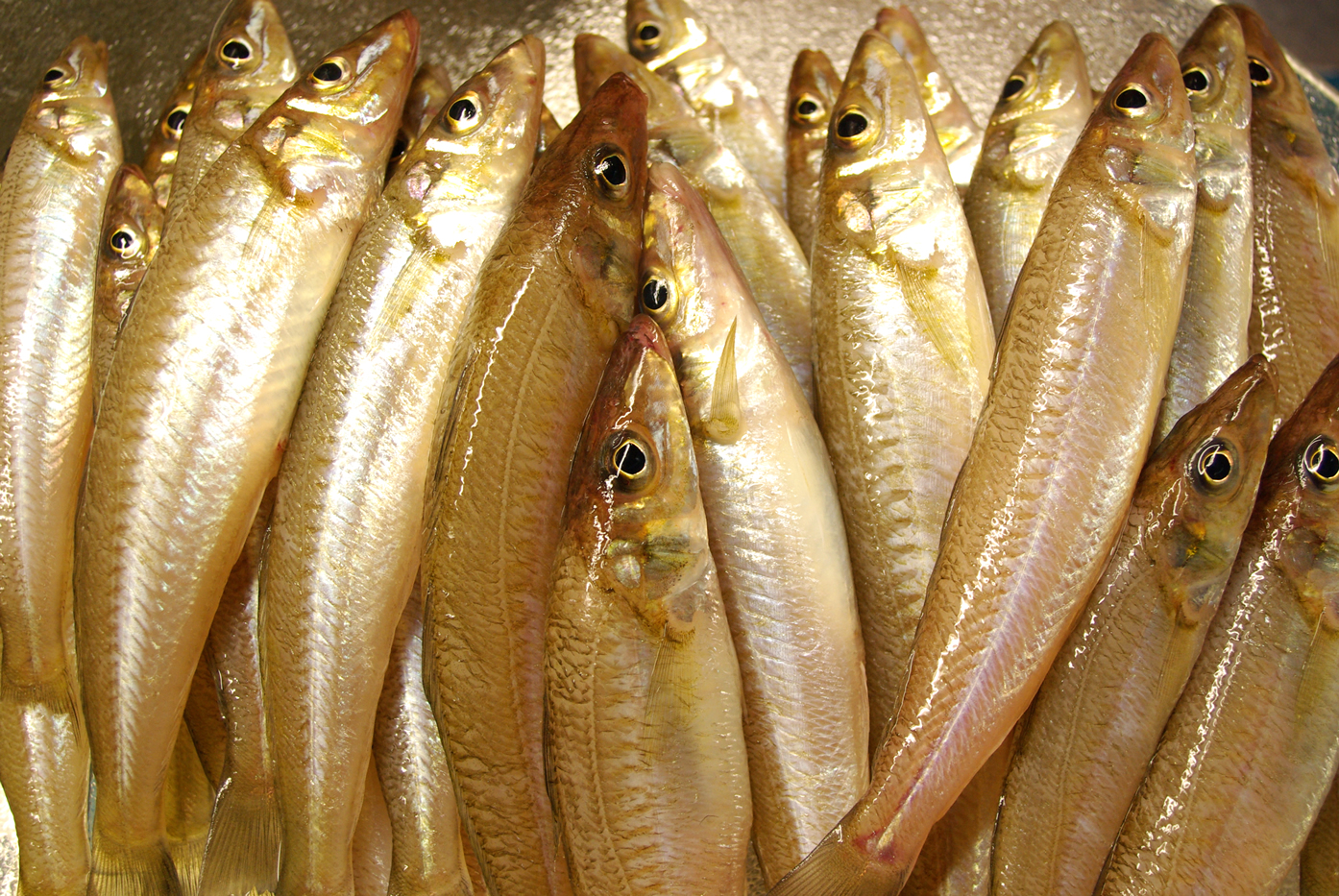
Japanese whiting taken from Tokyo Bay

The Japanese whiting ranges from Japan where it was first described, west toward Korea, China and Taiwan, possibly extending as far south as the Philippines, extending to Telaga Air estuarine of Kuching, Malaysia. The species is not only the most common sillaginid of Japan, but is one of the most common coastal species of any family, often making up a significant proportion of shallow water samples.

S. japonica occurs in a variety of habitats, with shallow sandy flats in bays, surf zones of beaches, protected eelgrass seabeds and occasionally estuaries used by the species. They are a shallow water species, operating in depths between 0 and 30 m (98 ft). Juveniles tend to use eelgrass beds as a nursery area, gaining both food and protection from these habitats while adults move to more exposed areas.

== Biology ==
Like other sillaginids, the Japanese whiting is benthic in nature, inhabiting the bottom layer of water in a marine system. This is due to the benthic nature of their prey during the daytime, which inhabit these layers of weaker water flow preferentially due to their body shape. Japanese whiting are a schooling species like most other sillaginids, and similarly are able to burrow into the sand to escape predators or forage for prey.

=== Diet ===
Studies of Japanese whiting occupying surf zones show that there is a distinct shift in diet as fish mature, with the change occurring at a length of around 20 mm. Young fish tended to consume a higher proportion of calanoid copepods, with small amounts of mysids also taken. Older fish take substantially more mysids, with few copepods or polychaetes taken. Other studies have found amphipods, bivalves, caridean shrimps, crabs and small fish also contribute to the diets of S. japonica in some areas, helping to reduce interspecific competition locally. In most all diet surveys, there is a shift in diet as size increases, probably to avoid intraspecific competition. Seasonal changes associated with prey abundance are also observed.

=== Reproduction ===
Japanese whiting produce between 13,600 and 68,900 egg in a spawning period, which occurs between June and October. The larval development has been extensively described by Oozeki et al., who described ten stages in the morphological and histological development of the species. Juveniles inhabit protected areas such as shallow bays and seagrass beds. The species becomes sexually mature by 2 years for both sexes, living to at least 4 years of age and reaching more than 30 cm in length.

== Relationship to humans ==
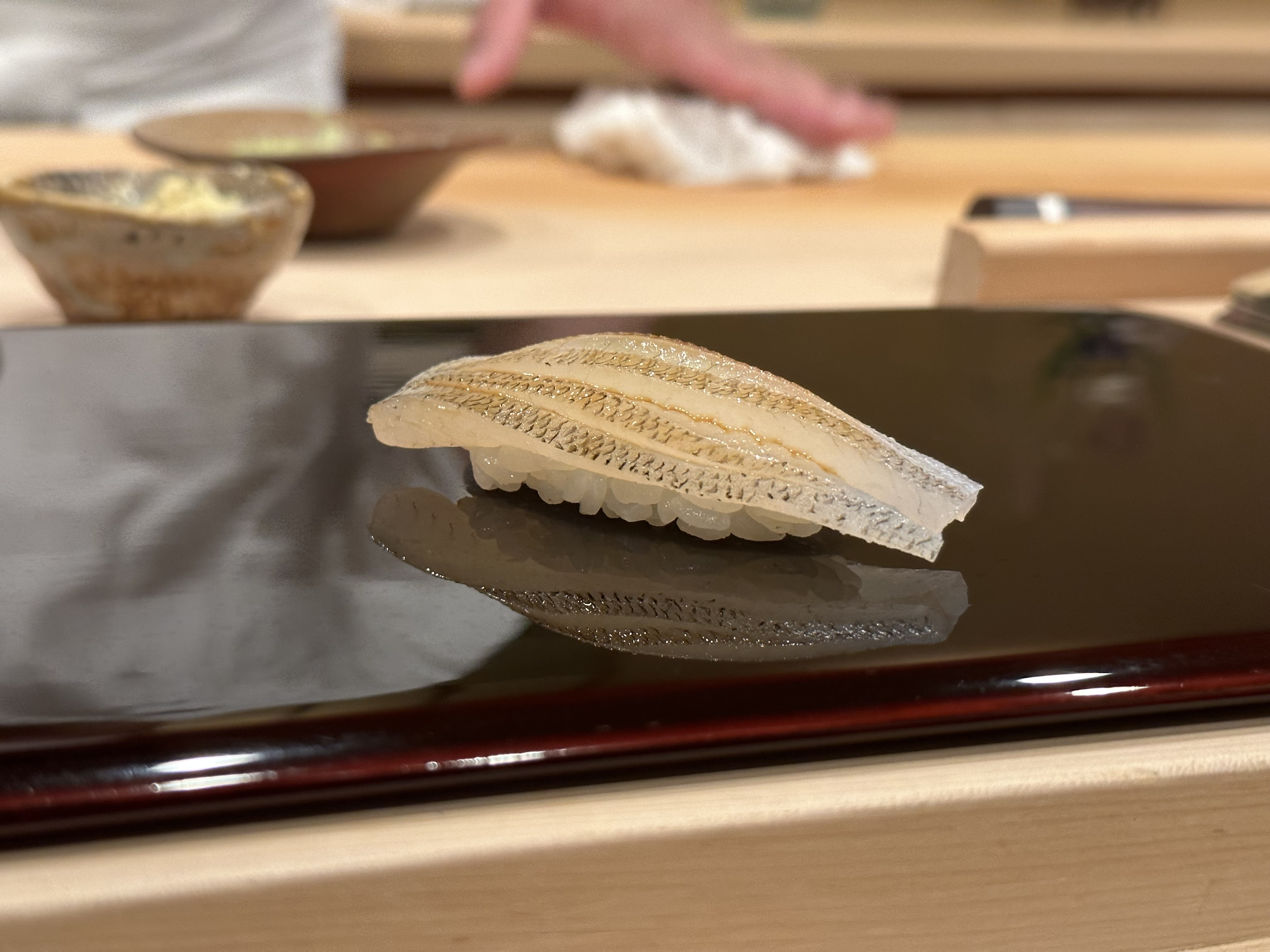
As sushi

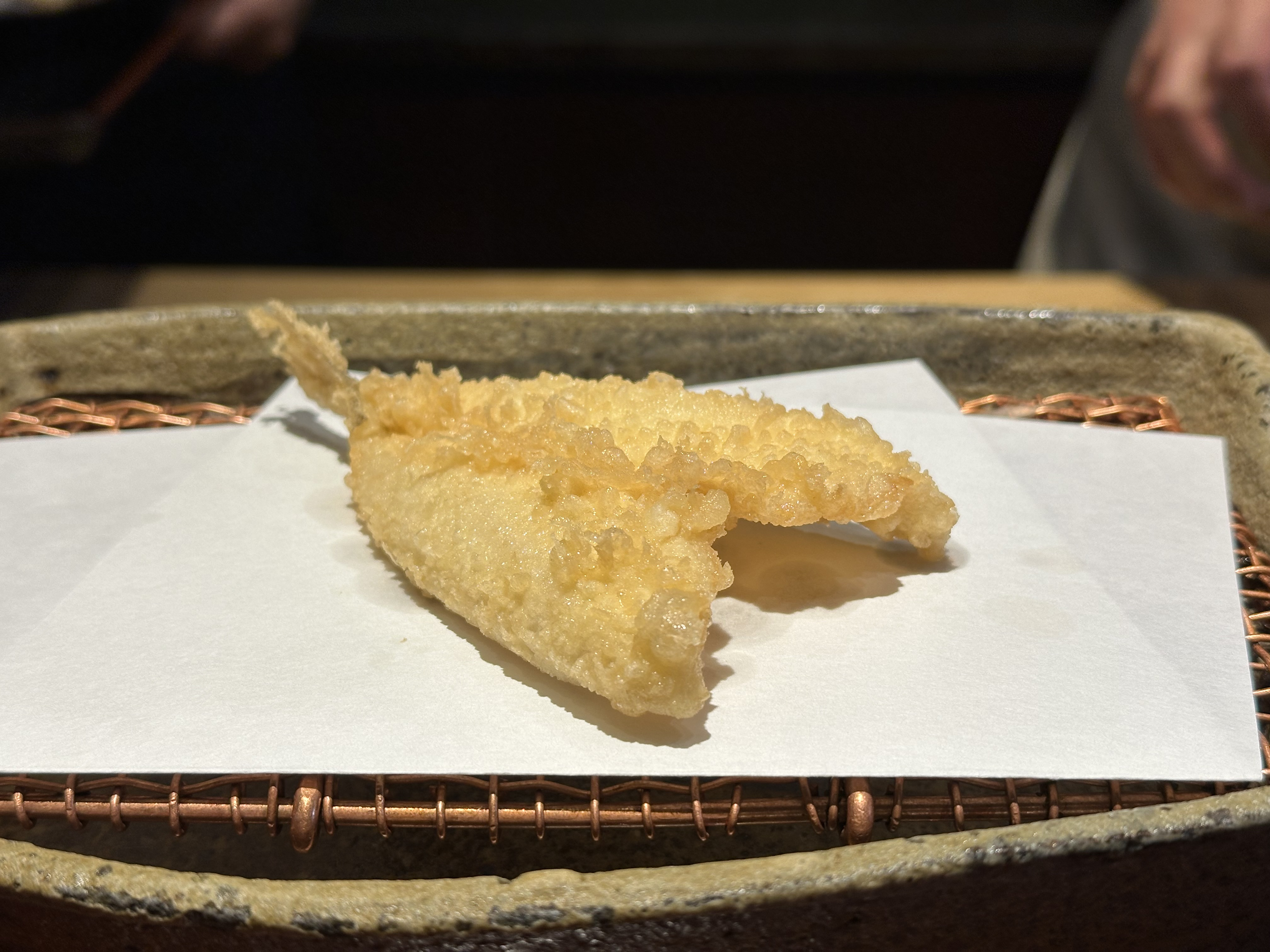
As tempura

Being one of the most common inshore species in Japan, it has become one of the most important commercial species in the country, greatly esteemed for its delicate flavour. Recreational fishermen in Japan also take the species often, especially in summer, with the species relatively easy to access from land based fishing areas. Many studies have been carried out on the breeding of the species in captivity, which has led to the development of an aquaculture market for Japanese whiting.

In other countries where other sillaginids are more prevalent, Japanese whiting are caught as a byproduct of smaller inshore fisheries, usually alongside other species of Sillago.
