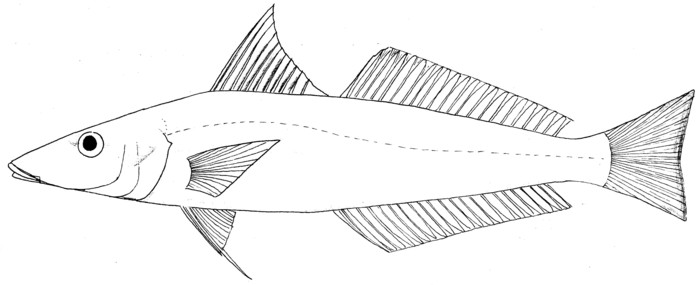

Conservation status
- Least Concern (IUCN 3.1)

Scientific classification
- Kingdom: Animalia
- Phylum: Chordata
- Class: Actinopterygii
- Order: Acanthuriformes
- Family: Sillaginidae
- Genus: Sillago
- Species: S. sihama

Binomial name
- Sillago sihama Fabricius, 1775
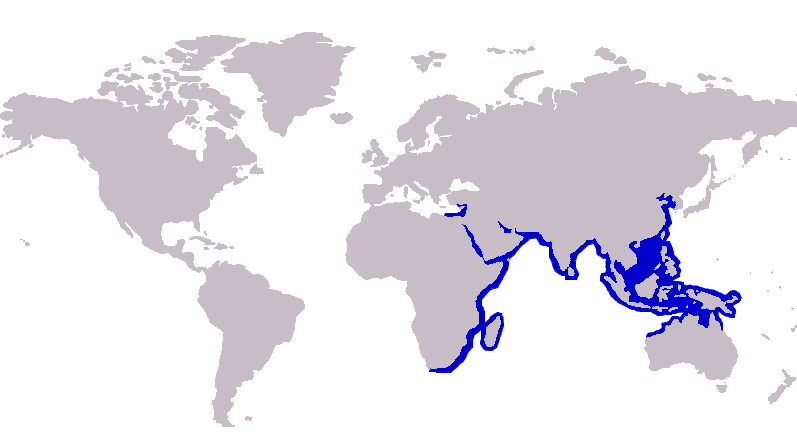
- Range of the Northern whiting

Synonyms
- Atherina sihama Fabricius, 1775; Platycephalus sihamus (Fabricius, 1775); Sciaena malabarica Bloch & Schneider, 1801; Sillago acuta Cuvier, 1817; Sillago erythraea Cuvier, 1829; Sillago malabarica Bloch & Schneider, 1849

= Northern whiting =

Species of fish

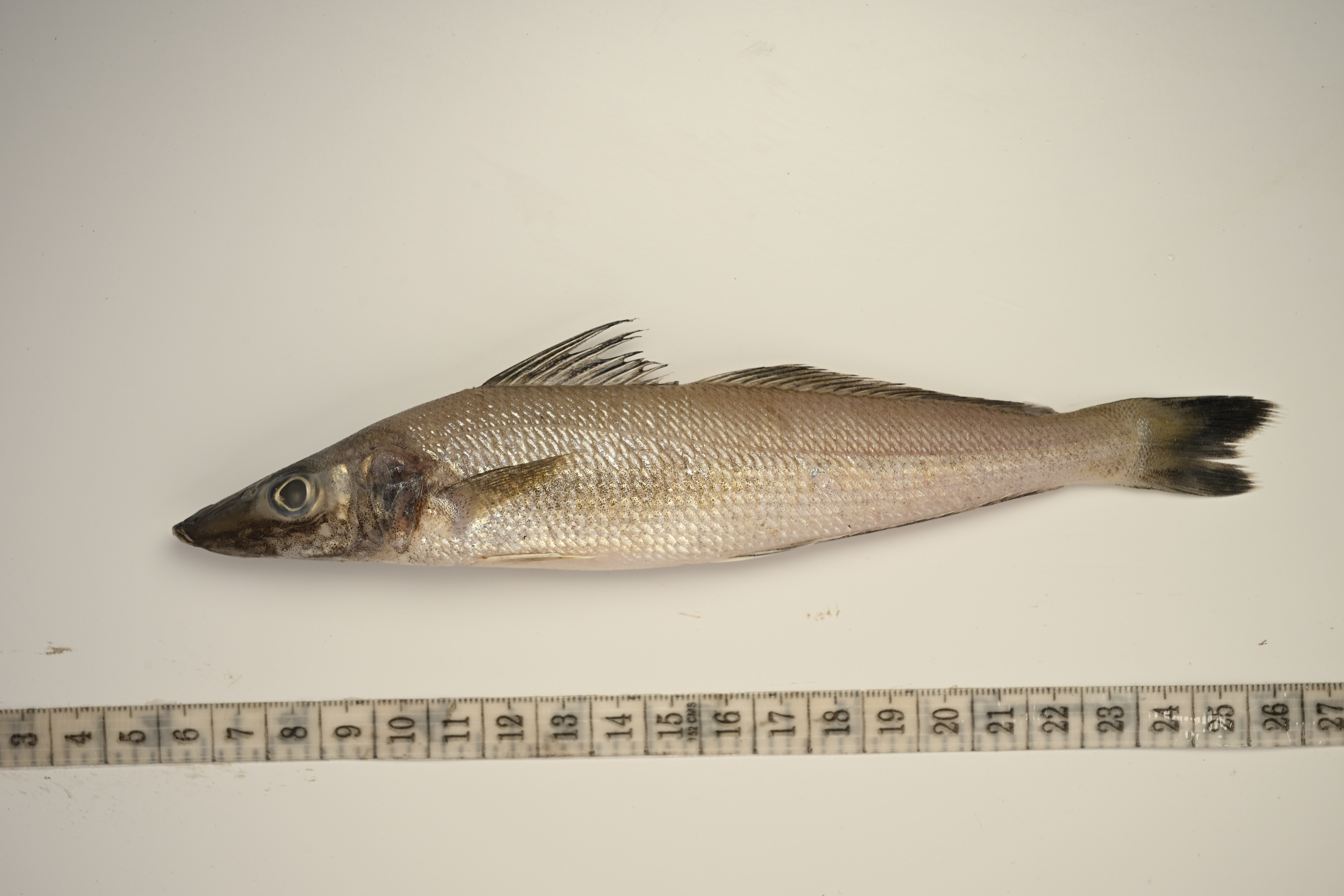
Sillago sihama

The northern whiting (Sillago sihama), also known as the silver whiting and sand smelt, is a marine fish, the most widespread and abundant member of the smelt-whiting family Sillaginidae. The northern whiting was the first species of sillaginid scientifically described and is therefore the type species of both the family Sillaginidae and the genus Sillago. The species is distributed in the Indo-Pacific region from South Africa in the west to Japan and Indonesia in the east. The northern whiting inhabits coastal areas to 60 m, but is most often found in shallow water around bays and estuaries, often entering freshwater. It is a carnivore, taking a variety of polychaetes and crustaceans. The species is of major economic importance throughout the Indo-Pacific. It is most frequently taken by seine nets and cast nets and marketed fresh.

== Taxonomy ==
The northern whiting is one of over 30 species in the genus Sillago, which is one of five genera belonging to the smelt whiting family Sillaginidae, this family was previously considered to be part of the Percoidea, a suborder of the Perciformes. The 5th edition of Fishes of the World classifies the Sillaginidae in the order Spariformes.

The northern whiting was first described by Peter Forsskål in 1775 under the name Atherina sihama, mistaking the fish as a species of hardyhead. The species was subsequently placed in the genus Platycephalus, before its true identity as a new genus was realized and Sillago was created in 1816. This was the first description and naming of any smelt-whiting, even though the author initially placed the species in the wrong genus. This makes S. sihama the type species of its genus, Sillago, as well as the type species of the family Sillaginidae, which was not to be named until 1846. However, Forsskål's name was not the only one applied to the species, with three other names given to the fish after the first correct naming. Two of these, S. acuta and S. erythraea were made by Georges Cuvier, and the other, Sciaena malabarica by Bloch and Schneider. These later names are junior synonyms and are discarded under the ICZN rules. Due to its wide distribution, the species has been applied a number of common names, with northern whiting, silver whiting, sand smelt and silver sillago the most common English names.

== Description ==
The northern whiting's similarity to all other species in the genus Sillago has led to many less abundant species being confused with it. The species is known to grow to a maximum size of 31 cm, however reports dating back to 1850 in Bengal suggest the species attains 3 feet (91 cm), which would make it the largest species of sillaginid. These reports were never etched into the literature on the species, possibly because of presumed confusion with the similar but unrelated and larger milkfish and bonefish that inhabit the area. The species has a slightly compressed, elongate body tapering toward the terminal mouth. The dorsal fin is in two parts, the first made of feeble spines and the second of soft rays headed by a single feeble spine, while the ventral profile is straight.

The fin anatomy is highly useful for identification purposes, with the species having 11 spines in the first dorsal fin, with one spine and 20 to 23 soft rays on the second dorsal fin. The anal fin has two spines with 21 to 23 soft rays posterior to the spines. Lateral line scales and cheek scales are also distinctive, with northern whiting possessing 66 to 72 lateral line scales and cheek scales positioned in 3–4 rows, all of which are ctenoid. The amount of vertebrae are also diagnostic, having 34 in total. The swim bladder is the most accurate diagnostic feature, having two posterior extensions and two anterior extensions. The two anterior extensions extend forward and diverge to end on each side of the basioccipital above the auditory capsule. Two lateral extensions also commence anteriorly, each of them sending a blind tubule anterolaterally and then extending along the abdominal wall. The lateral extensions are normally convoluted and have blind tubules arising along their length. The two posterior tapering extensions project into the caudal region, with one usually longer than the other.

The colour of the body is variable, often being light tan, silvery yellow-brown, sandy brown, or honey coloured. The underside of the fish is usually paler, being brown to white in colour. A silver midlateral, longitudinal stripe is normally present. The dorsal fins are dusky on each end, with or without rows of dark brown spots on the second dorsal fin membranes. The caudal fin is dusky terminally, and there is no dark blotch at the base of the pectoral fin as in other sillaginids. All other fins are hyaline, but the anal fin occasionally has a whitish margin.

== Distribution and habitat ==
The northern whiting is the most geographically widespread of the Sillaginidae, but is still confined to the Indian and Western Pacific Oceans. Its easternmost range is from South Africa north along the west coast of Africa and into the Red sea and Persian Gulf. It is common along the Indian and Asian coast, extending to Taiwan and has been recorded in Japan, however these likely are confused with S. japonica. It is common throughout the Indonesian Archipelago, the Philippines and extends as far south as northern Australia. The species has been declared an invasive species to the eastern Mediterranean, passing through the Suez Canal from the Red Sea since 1977 as part of the Lessepsian migration, becoming widespread. In fact, the species of smelt-whiting which has invaded the Mediterranean is S. suezensis.

The northern whiting is primarily an inshore species, rarely seen in depth of more than 20 m. It commonly inhabits both high energy beaches and sandbars as well as more protected bays along mangrove creeks and tidal flats. The species commonly enters estuaries, and has even been recorded in freshwater, despite the fact it has no anatomical adaptations to cope with this change. The northern whiting does not migrate or move offshore at various times of the year like some co-occurring sillaginids.

== Biology ==
Like most members of the family, S. sihama can bury itself in the sand when danger approaches and commonly avoids seine-nets by employing this behaviour, giving them the common name 'sandborer' in some countries.

=== Diet ===
The principal items of diet are polychaete worms, small prawns and copepods, with other Crustacea including Decapoda, Ocypoda, shrimps, and amphipods also taken. Small fish are often taken and filamentous algae is consumed. Australian specimens frequently contain polychaete worms and small Crustacea. The species often has a similar, but slightly different diet compared to other coexisting sillaginids and other fishes, with few cases of wide dietary overlap recorded. The juveniles and adults also show disparity in their diets, with juveniles taking zooplankton such as copepods, while adults take larger crustaceans and polychaetes.

=== Reproduction ===
Northern whiting reach sexual maturity at a minimum 106 mm in males and 117 mm in females, although most individuals from both sexes mature once they reach 130 mm in length and one year of age. Growth in the species is rapid, attaining a length of 13 to 14 cm at about 1 year, 16 to 20 cm at 2 years, 20 to 24 cm at 3 years and 24 to 28 cm by 4 years of age.

Spawning occurs year-round, but a peak of spawning activity occurs once during the year at variable times over the species range. Peak of spawning in Thailand is August and November, November to April in the Philippines, November to March in India, and between July and February with a peak in November in Sri Lanka. The egg is spherical, colourless and buoyant, 0.5 to 0.6 mm in diameter, and without a large oil globule. Fecundity varied between 16 682 and 166 130. The eggs and larval development of S. sihama has been extensively described separately by Bensam and Kato et al., with the distinguishing feature of the larvae being the pattern of melanophores distributed on the caudal fin base, having these in a vertical line.

== Relationship to humans ==
Considerable catches of northern whiting are made but generally not reflected in the fishery statistics of countries they are taken in. In Pakistan the main fishery takes place in June to July. The catches reported in this single country range from 102 t (1980) to 859 t (1982) with an average of 404 t. The species has come under heavy threat in Chinese waters from overfishing and environmental pollution.
