= R. J. McKay =

Australian-born biologist

Roland J McKay
- Born: Perth, Australia
- Education: University of Western Australia
- Known for: Exotic and translocated Freshwater Fish; marine fish systematics; Australian wolf spiders (Family Lycosidae).
- Scientific career
- Fields: Marine biologist
- Workplaces: Western Australian Museum;Queensland Museum; Museum of Queensland, Mount Isa
- Doctoral advisor: B.Jamieson' D.Wadley

Roland J. McKay is an Australian-born biologist known for his work in exotic and translocated freshwater fish in Australia. McKay is curator of fishes at the Queensland Museum and his work has been quoted extensively. He also contributed a key section on "Introductions of Exotic Fishes in Australia" in Distribution, Biology and Management of Exotic Fishes published by Johns Hopkins University Press.

== Biography ==
Earlier in his career, McKay focused on introduction and translocation of exotic freshwater fish in Australia. He extensively researched the Australian Aquarium Industry. Later, he also extended his study to fish that were not exotic but just unusual.

He is recognised as an authority on the fishes of the Family Sillaginidae McKay, R.J.1985.A Revision of the fishes of the family Sillaginidae. Mem.Qd.Museum, 22(1):1-73.

McKay, R.J. 1992. FAO Species Catalogue 14. Sillaginid fishes of the world (Family Sillaginidae). An Annotated and Illustrated Catalogue of the Sillago, Smelt or Indo-Pacific Whiting species Known to Date. FAO Fisheries Synopsis, No. 125, Vol. 14. 1992. 87 p., 137 figs.

Institute in San Diego, California, McKay participated in the symposium on "Jumbo Squid Invasions in the Eastern Pacific Ocean".

== See also ==
- Category:Taxa named by Roland J. McKay
