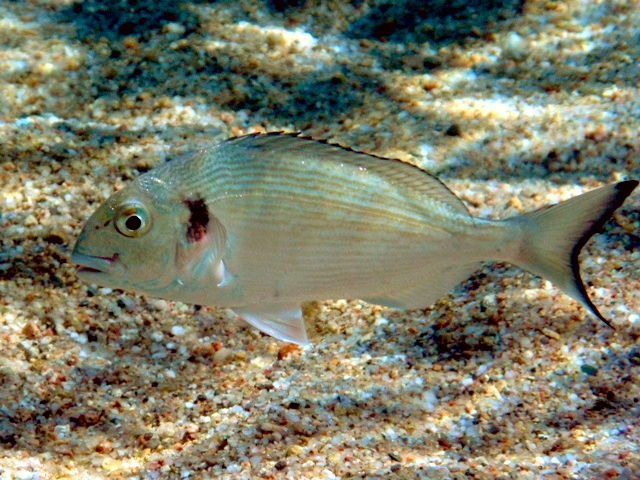
- Gilt-head bream (Sparus aurata)

Scientific classification
- Kingdom: Animalia
- Phylum: Chordata
- Class: Actinopterygii
- Clade: Percomorpha
- Order: Spariformes; Bleeker, 1860

Families
- See text

= Spariformes =

Order of fishes

Spariformes is an order of ray-finned fishes consisting of six families within the series Percomorpha.

== Taxonomy ==
Spariformes was first used as a taxonomic term in 1860 by the Dutch physician, herpetologist and ichthyologist Pieter Bleeker. Traditionally the taxa within the Spariformes were classified within the Perciformes, with some authorities using the term "Sparoid lineage" for the families Centracanthidae, Nemipteridae, Lethrinidae and Sparidae. Since then the use of molecular phylogenetics in more modern classifications has meant that the Spariformes is recognised as a valid order within the Percomorpha containing six families, with Callanthidae, Sillaginidae and Lobotidae included. Other workers have found that the Centracanthidae is synonymous with Sparidae and that the Spariformes contains only the remaining three families of the "Sparoid lineage". Studies have further suggested that the order Tetraodontiformes are the closest taxonomic grouping to the Spariformes.

== Families ==
Spariformes contains the following six families, according to the 5th edition of Fishes of the World:

- Callanthiidae Ogilby, 1899 (Splendid perches or groppos)
- Sillaginidae Richardson, 1846 (Sillagos)
- Lobotidae Gill, 1861 (Tripletails)
- Nemipteridae Regan, 1913 (Threadfin breams)
- Lethrinidae Bonaparte, 1831 (Emperor breams)
- Sparidae Rafinesque, 1818 (Porgies)
