= Tenkara fishing =

Style of fishing

Tenkara fly fishing

Tenkara fishing (Japanese: テンカラ釣り, literally: "fishing from heaven", "sky fishing", or "empty sky fishing" as ten = "sky" and kara = "empty") is a type of simple rod angling traditionally practiced in Japan. Primarily used for mountain stream trout fishing, tenkara is still a fairly rare method even among freshwater anglers in Japan, and was largely unknown outside Japan until 2009, when the company Tenkara USA, founded by Daniel Galhardo, introduced and popularized tenkara outside Japan.

Although there are similarities between tenkara and traditional Western-style fly fishing, the two techniques developed independently of each other, with tenkara being purely Japanese in origin. In addition, fly fishing uses specialized rod, reel and line and a type of ultralight fishing lure known as artificial fly, while traditional tenkara is reel-less and mostly uses real insects as bait (although modern tenkara tends to use so-called Japanese Flies).

== Origins ==
Tenkara fishing originated in Japan more than 400 years ago and originated with professional fishermen in the mountain streams of Japan who found it an effective method of catching the local fish, yamame, iwana and amago.

Originally the rod was simply a bamboo/cane rod, which was cut and treated, but unlike contemporary western bamboo rods, they were not "manufactured" (i.e. split and glued back together). In contrast to the western fly-fishing tradition where anglers used heavy wooden rods, in Japan anglers always used bamboo, which is readily available and very light. Because of its light weight, Japanese anglers were able to use very long bamboo rods and reach as far as needed without the need to develop reels for the short rods used in the west.

Tenkara remained the domain of commercial tenkara anglers until the early 1900s. In the 1950s, it started seeing a slow resurgence in interest in a few pockets throughout Japan. Ishigaki, in the early 1970s, became an influential figure in spreading tenkara as a method of sport fishing throughout Japan. In 2009, Daniel Galhardo founded Tenkara USA with the purpose of introducing tenkara outside of Japan. Ishigaki started mentoring Galhardo so that tenkara, as practiced in Japan, would be disseminated outside its country of origin.

== Equipment ==
Tenkara fishing can be seen as a streamlined counterpart to western fly-fishing. The equipment is designed to direct focus to the actual fishing and catching of the fish, not to cause a major preoccupation with the equipment. Only a rod, tenkara line and fly are necessary for tenkara fishing (no reel is used).

The appeal of tenkara is its elegant simplicity. There are also other advantages of using the long tenkara rods when fishing in mountain streams, primarily the lightness of the line and delicate presentation. A long rod allows for precise placement of the fly on small pools and allows for holding the fly in place on the other side of a current. The other main advantage of using the long tenkara rod is precise control for manipulation of the fly.

Tenkara rod: A very long and flexible rod (usually telescopic) is used in tenkara fishing. The rods normally range from 3.3 to 4.5 metres (11 to 15 ft) long. 3.6 m (12 ft) is common. These rods were originally made of bamboo, but are nowadays made with carbon fibre and/or fibre glass. They also have a handle similar to fly-fishing rods that can be made of wood (the more prized rods) or cork. A tenkara rod is chosen based on the environment it will be used; whereas tenkara rods are typically longer than most other fishing rods, a tenkara rod's length has the distinct advantage of reaching across currents.

Tenkara line: As in fly-fishing, it is the tenkara line that propels the weightless fly forward. In tenkara, the traditional and most commonly used line is a tapered furled line (twisted monofilament), of the same length or slightly shorter than the rod. The main advantage of tapered lines is the delicate presentation and ease of casting. Alternatively, a tenkara "level" line can be used. Level lines are specially formulated fluorocarbon adjusted to the desired length as they maintain the same diameter throughout their length. Tapered lines are typically easier to cast and preferred by people getting started with tenkara, whereas level lines tend to be lighter (slightly harder to cast), but can be kept off the water more easily.

The traditional tenkara line has a loop of braided line at its thicker end. This braided line is used to tie the tenkara line directly to the tip of the rod by using a cow hitch (a.k.a. girth hitch) knot. The line at the rod's tip needs to have a stopper knot, which will hold the cow hitch in place. It is a very secure method to attach the line.

Tippet: This is the same as a regular fly-fishing tippet, and is used to connect the fly to the line (which is too thick to tie directly to the fly). Usually between 30 cm (12 in) and 1 metre (3 ft 3 in) of tippet is added to the end of the line. This is typically referred to in Japanese as "hea" (for hair).

Tenkara fly: Artificial flies are used in tenkara fly-fishing. These are tied with thread, feathers and sometimes fur as in western fly-fishing. Traditionally a special reverse hackle wet-fly is used. In Japan it is known as "kebari". These traditional Japanese flies differ from most Western flies, in that the hackle is tied facing forward.

== See also ==
- Casting
- Reach cast
- Spey casting
- Surf fishing
- Sakasa Kebari
