= Recreational fishing =

Fishing as a hobby

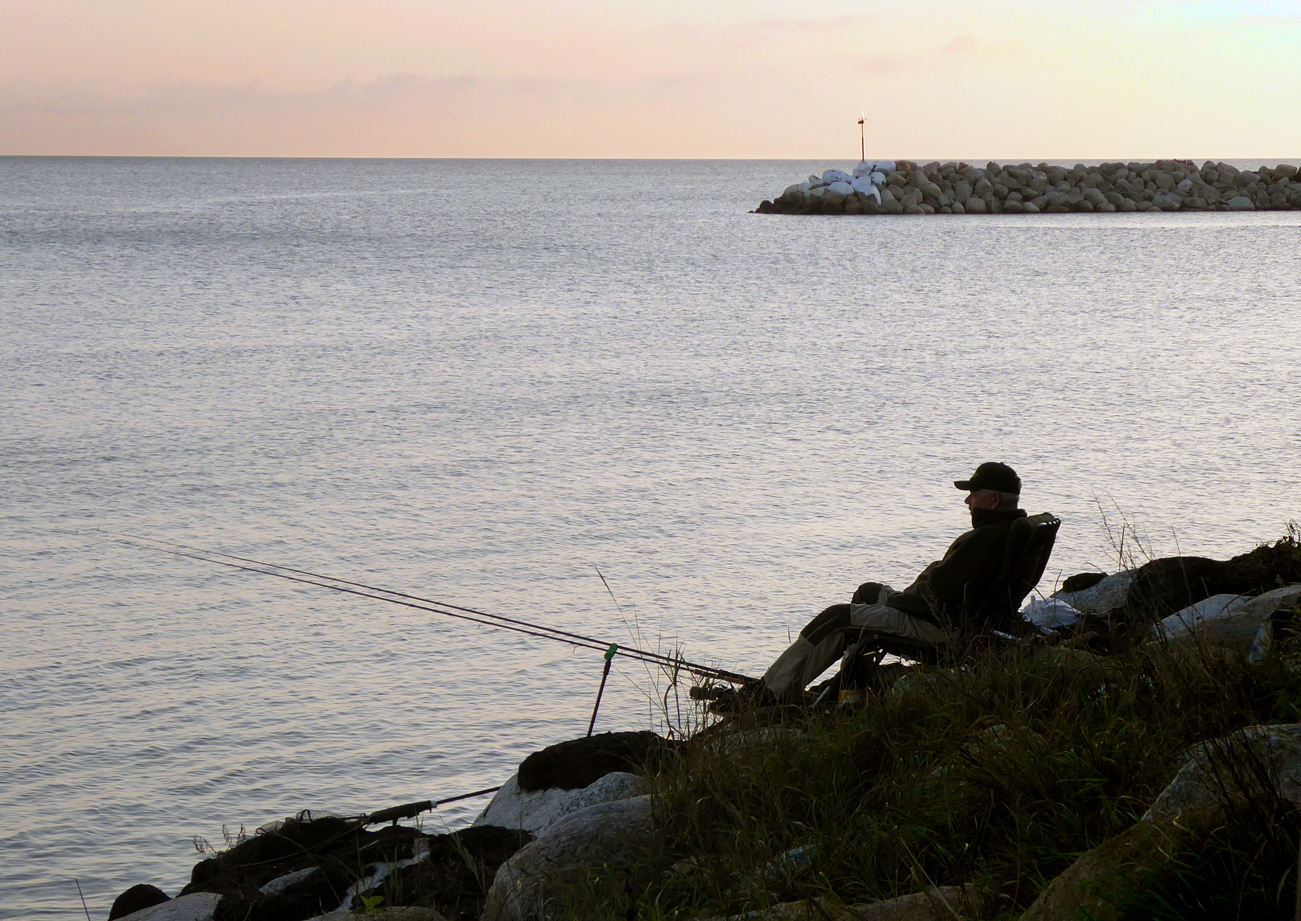
Recreational fishing at sunset

Recreational fishing, also called sport fishing or game fishing, is fishing for leisure, exercise or competition. It can be contrasted with commercial fishing, which is occupational fishing activities done for profit; or subsistence fishing, which is fishing for survival and livelihood.

The most common form of recreational fishing is angling, which is done with a rig of rod, reel, line, hooks and any one of a wide range of baits, as well as other complementary devices such as weights, floats, swivels and method feeders, collectively referred to as terminal tackles. Lures are frequently used instead of fresh bait when fishing for predatory fishes. Some hobbyists hand-make custom tackles themselves, including plastic lures and artificial flies.

Other forms of recreational fishing include spearfishing, which is done with a speargun or harpoon usually while diving; and bowfishing, which is done from above the water with archery equipment such as a compound bow or crossbow. Noodling and trout tickling are recreational fishing activities that uses hands to catch fish. There are also fishing techniques that uses nets, traps and other unconventional tools such as snag hook, sledgehammer and even boomerang, although inhumane or destructive fishing practices are generally discouraged and some are outright banned in most countries.

Popular fish species pursued by recreational fishermen are collectively known as game fishes. Big-game fishing, which targets large open-water fishes such as tuna, billfishes (marlins and swordfish), grouper and shark, is typically conducted from yachts, although some are also done from the shore by casting far into the waves. Although the caught fish can be consumed as food, catch and release is often encouraged for conservation purposes.

== History ==
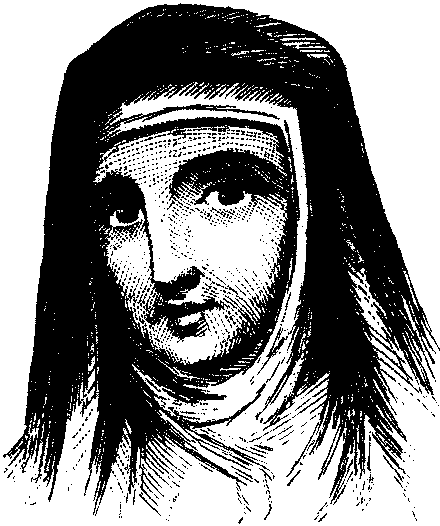
Sketch of Juliana Berners, author of the earliest essay on recreational fishing.

The early evolution of fishing as a recreation is not clear, but there is anecdotal evidence for fly fishing in Japan as early as the 9th century BCE, and Claudius Aelianus (175–235 CE) describes fly fishing in Macedonia in his work On the Nature of Animals.

For the early Japanese and Macedonians, however, fly fishing was likely to have been a means of survival, rather than recreation. It is possible that antecedents of recreational fly fishing arrived in England with the Norman Conquest of 1066. Although the point in history where fishing could first be said to be recreational is not clear, it is clear that recreational fishing had fully arrived with the publication of The Compleat Angler.

The earliest English essay on recreational fishing was published in 1496, shortly after the invention of the printing press. The authorship of this was attributed to Dame Juliana Berners, the prioress of the Benedictine Sopwell Nunnery. The essay was titled Treatyse of Fysshynge wyth an Angle, and was published in the second Boke of Saint Albans, a treatise on hawking, hunting and heraldry. These were major interests of the nobility, and the publisher, Wynkyn de Worde, was concerned that the book should be kept from those who were not gentlemen, since their immoderation in angling might "utterly destroy it".

During the 16th century the work was much read, and was reprinted many times. Treatyse includes detailed information on fishing waters, the construction of rods and lines, and the use of natural baits and artificial flies. It also includes modern concerns about conservation and angler etiquette.

The earliest English poetical treatise on angling, The Secrets of Angling by John Dennys (who was said to have been a fishing companion of Shakespeare), was published in 1613. Footnotes of the work, written by Dennys' editor William Lawson, make the first mention of the phrase to "cast a fly": "The trout gives the most gentlemanly and readiest sport of all, if you fish with an artificial fly, a line twice your rod's length of three hairs' thickness... and if you have learnt the cast of the fly."

In a United States context, The Outdoor Industry Association, states that fishing participation has continued its 11-year upward trajectory, adding 300,000 participants and reaching its highest number of participants since 2007. At the same time, the participation rate dipped slightly by 0.1%, bringing the fishing rate to 16.4%. This was due to the increasing population of the United States.

The "Leaky Bucket" illustrates the annual churn of fishing participants, or those people joining/rejoining the activity and those quitting in a given year. From 2017 to 2018, there was significant churn in fishing participation. While 9.1 million people stopped fishing, 9.4 million started. All of this change led to a fairly high churn rate of 18.5%, but also resulted in a net gain of 300,000 fishing participants.

In 2018 participants spent a collective 883 million days fishing, averaging 17.9 annual fishing days per person. These average outing were done by an average of 2.1% over the past 3 years.

=== Development ===
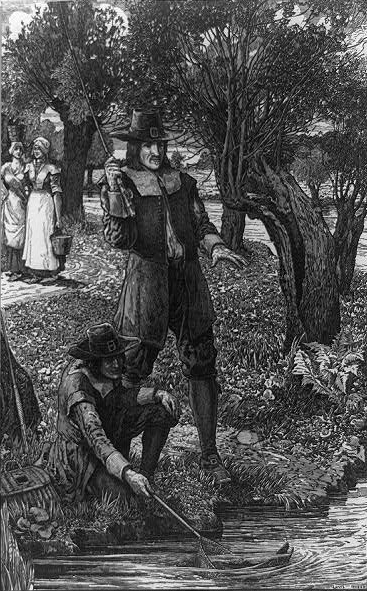
Izaak Walton's Compleat Angler, published in 1653 helped popularize fly fishing as a sport. Woodcut by Louis Rhead

Recreational fishing took a great leap forward after the English Civil War, where a newly found interest in the activity left its mark on the many books and treatises that were written on the subject at the time. The renowned officer in the Parliamentary army, Robert Venables, published in 1662 The Experienced Angler, or Angling improved, being a general discourse of angling, imparting many of the aptest ways and choicest experiments for the taking of most sorts of fish in pond or river. Another Civil War veteran to enthusiastically take up fishing was Richard Franck. He was the first to describe salmon fishing in Scotland, and both in that and trout-fishing with artificial fly he was a practical angler. He was the first angler to name the burbot, and commended the salmon of the River Thames.

The Compleat Angler was written by Izaak Walton in 1653 (although Walton continued to add to it for a quarter of a century) and described the fishing in the Derbyshire Wye. It was a celebration of the art and spirit of fishing in prose and verse; 6 verses were quoted from John Dennys's earlier work. A second part to the book was added by Walton's friend Charles Cotton. More than 300 editions of The Compleat Angler have been published. The pastoral discourse was enriched with country fishing folklore, songs and poems, recipes and anecdotes, moral meditations, and quotes from classic literature. The central character, Piscator, champions the art of angling, but with an air of tranquility also relishes the pleasures of friendship, verse and song, and good food and drink.

Trading card of the Ustonson company, an early firm specializing in fishing equipment, and holder of a Royal Warrant from the 1760s.

Cotton's additions completed the instruction in fly fishing and advised on the making of artificial flies where he listed sixty five varieties. Charles Kirby designed an improved fishing hook in 1655 that remains relatively unchanged to this day. He went on to invent the Kirby bend, a distinctive hook with an offset point, still commonly used today.

During the 18th century, the fishing industry became commercialized - rods and tackle were sold at the haberdashers store. After the Great Fire of London in 1666, artisans moved to Redditch which became a centre of production of fishing related products from the 1730s. Onesimus Ustonson established his trading shop in 1761, and his establishment remained as a market leader for the next century. He received a Royal Warrant from three successive monarchs starting with King George IV.

Some have credited Onesimus with the invention of the multiplying winch, although he was certainly the first to advertise its sale. Early multiplying reels were wide and had a small diameter, and their gears, made of brass, often wore down after extensive use. His earliest advertisement in the form of a trading card date from 1768 and was entitled To all lovers of angling. A full list of the tackles he sold included artificial flies, and 'the best sort of multiplying brass winches both stop and plain'. The commercialization of the industry came at a time of expanded interest in fishing as a recreational hobby for members of the aristocracy.

=== Expansion ===
British fly-fishing continued to develop in the 19th century, with the emergence of fly fishing clubs, along with the appearance of several books on the subject of fly tying and fly fishing techniques. Alfred Ronalds took up the sport of fly fishing, learning the craft on the rivers Trent, Blythe and Dove. On the River Blythe, near what is today Creswell Green, Ronalds constructed a bankside fishing hut designed primarily as an observatory of trout behaviour in the river. From this hut, and elsewhere on his home rivers, Ronalds conducted experiments and formulated the ideas that eventually were published in The Fly-fisher's Entomology in 1836.

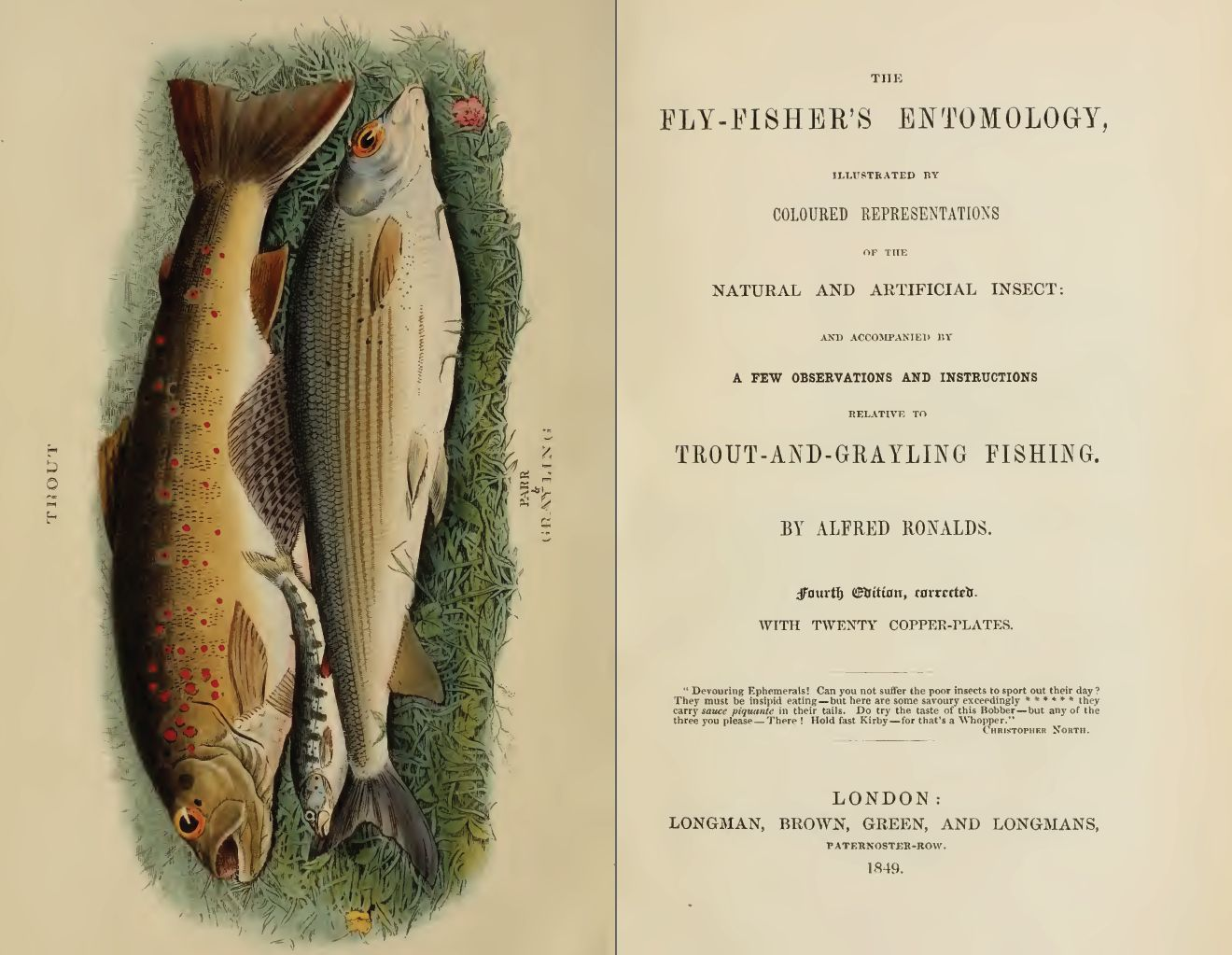
The Fly-fisher's Entomology by Alfred Ronalds had a great influence on the development of fly fishing when it was first published in 1836.

He combined his knowledge of fly fishing with his skill as an engraver and printer, to lavish his work with 20 colour plates. It was the first comprehensive work related to the entomology associated with fly fishing and most fly-fishing historians credit Ronalds with setting a literature standard in 1836 that is still followed today. Describing methods, techniques and, most importantly, artificial flies, in a meaningful way for the angler and illustrating them in colour is a method of presentation that can be seen in most fly-fishing literature today.

By the mid to late 19th century, expanding leisure opportunities for the middle and lower classes began to have its effect on fly fishing, which steadily grew in mass appeal. The expansion of the railway network in Britain allowed the less affluent for the first time to take weekend trips to the seaside or to rivers for fishing. Richer hobbyists ventured further abroad. The large rivers of Norway replete with large stocks of salmon began to attract fishers from England in large numbers in the middle of the century - Jones's guide to Norway, and salmon-fisher's pocket companion, published in 1848, was written by Frederic Tolfrey and was a popular guide to the country.

In southern England, dry-fly fishing acquired an elitist reputation as the only acceptable method of fishing the slower, clearer rivers of the south such as the River Test and the other chalk streams concentrated in Hampshire, Surrey, Dorset and Berkshire (see Southern England Chalk Formation for the geological specifics). The weeds found in these rivers tend to grow very close to the surface, and it was felt necessary to develop new techniques that would keep the fly and the line on the surface of the stream. These became the foundation of all later dry-fly developments.

However, there was nothing to prevent the successful employment of wet flies on these chalk streams, as G. E. M. Skues proved with his nymph and wet fly techniques. To the horror of dry-fly purists, Skues later wrote two books, Minor Tactics of the Chalk Stream, and The Way of a Trout with a Fly, which greatly influenced the development of wet fly fishing. In northern England and Scotland, many anglers also favored wet-fly fishing, where the technique was more popular and widely practiced than in southern England. One of Scotland's leading proponents of the wet fly in the early-to-mid 19th century was W.C. Stewart, who published "The Practical Angler" in 1857.

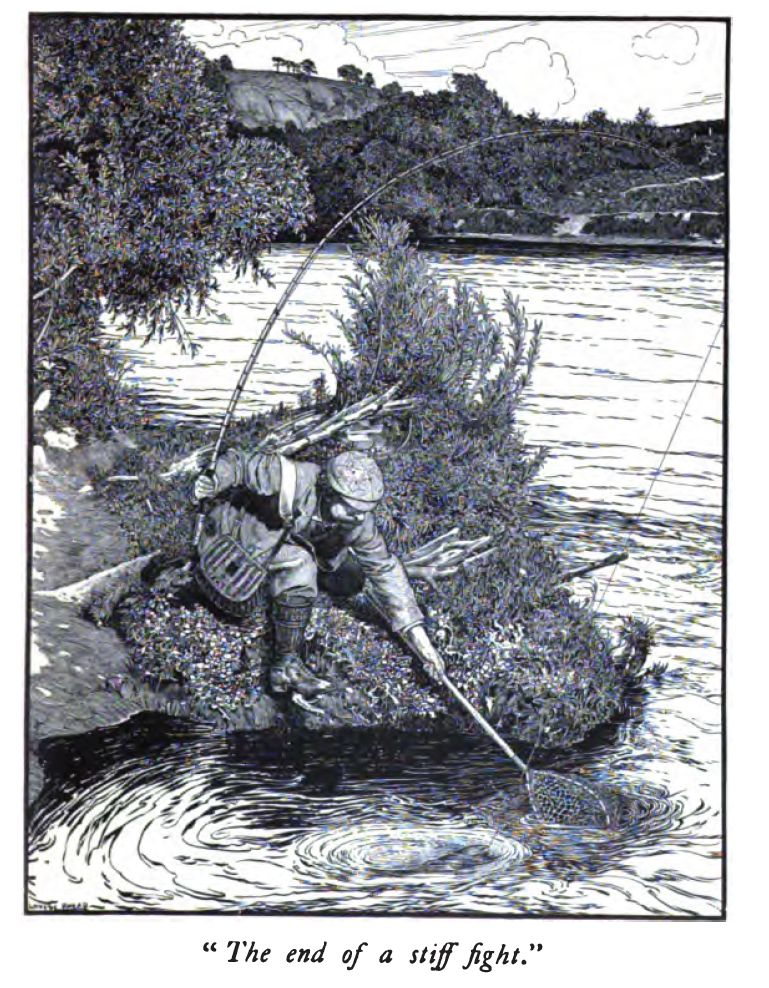
From The Speckled Brook Trout by Louis Rhead (1902)

In the United States, attitudes toward methods of fly fishing were not nearly as rigidly defined, and both dry- and wet-fly fishing were soon adapted to the conditions of the country. Fly anglers there, are thought to be the first anglers to have used artificial lures for bass fishing. After pressing into service the fly patterns and tackle designed for trout and salmon to catch largemouth and smallmouth bass, they began to adapt these patterns into specific bass flies. Fly anglers seeking bass developed the spinner/fly lure and bass popper fly, which are still used today.

In the late 19th century, American anglers, such as Theodore Gordon, in the Catskill Mountains of New York began using fly tackle to fish the region's brook trout-rich streams such as the Beaverkill and Willowemoc Creek. Many of these early American fly anglers also developed new fly patterns and wrote extensively about their sport, increasing the popularity of fly fishing in the region and in the United States as a whole. Albert Bigelow Paine, a New England author, wrote about fly fishing in The Tent Dwellers, a book about a three-week trip he and a friend took to central Nova Scotia in 1908.

Participation in fly fishing peaked in the early 1920s in the eastern states of Maine and Vermont and in the Midwest in the spring creeks of Wisconsin. Along with deep sea fishing, Ernest Hemingway did much to popularize fly fishing through his works of fiction, including The Sun Also Rises.

Big-game fishing started as a sport after the invention of the motorized boat. In 1898, Dr. Charles Frederick Holder, a marine biologist and early conservationist, pioneered this sport and went on to publish many articles and books on the subject noted for their combination of accurate scientific detail with exciting narratives.

One method of growing popularity is kayak fishing. Kayaks are stealthy and allow anglers to reach areas not fishable from land or by conventional boat. In addition, fishing from kayaks is regarded by some as an effort to level the playing field, to a degree, with their quarry and/or to challenge their angling abilities further by bringing an additional level of complexity to their sport

== Sport fishing ==
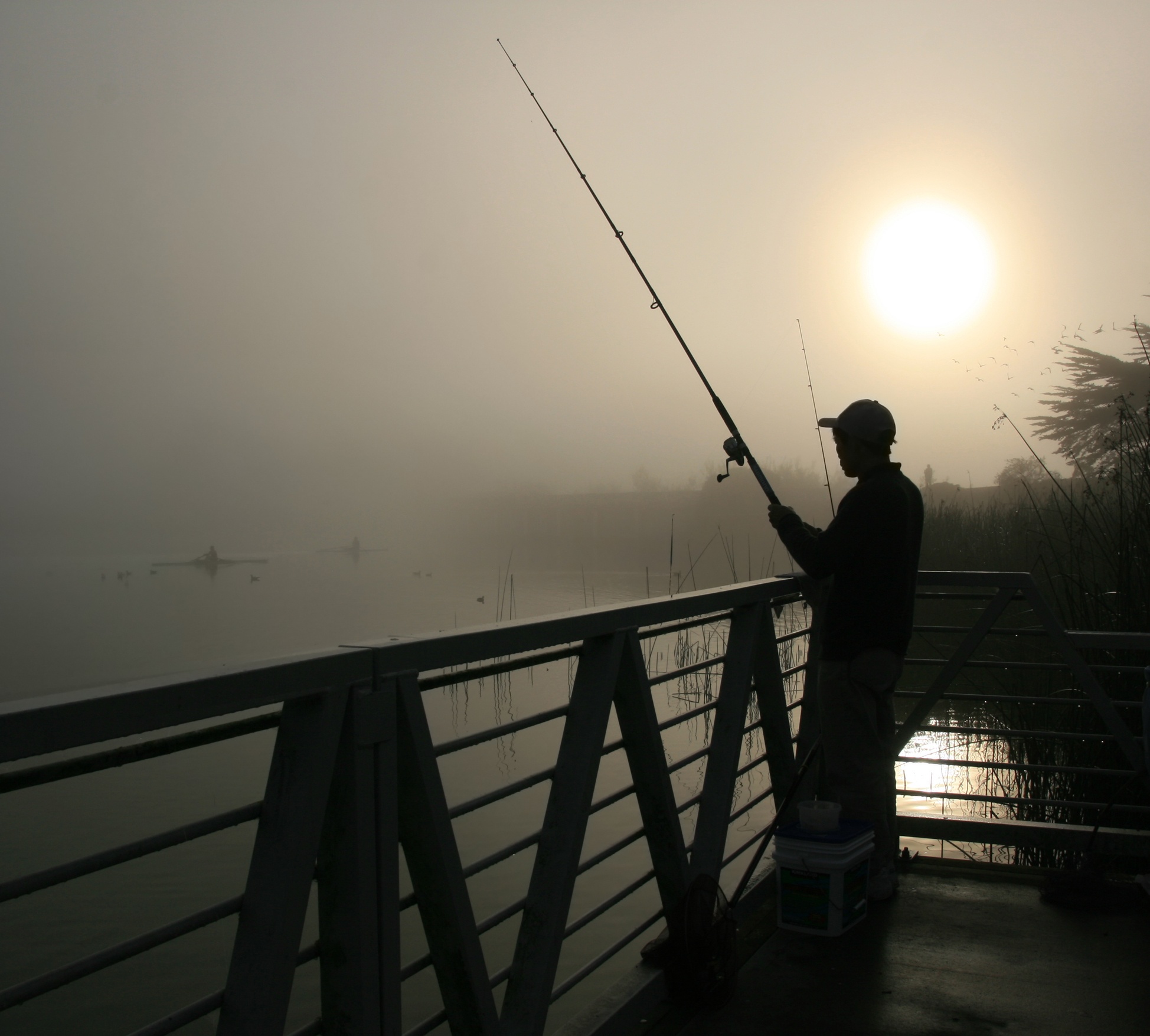
Fisherman at Lake Merced using a rod

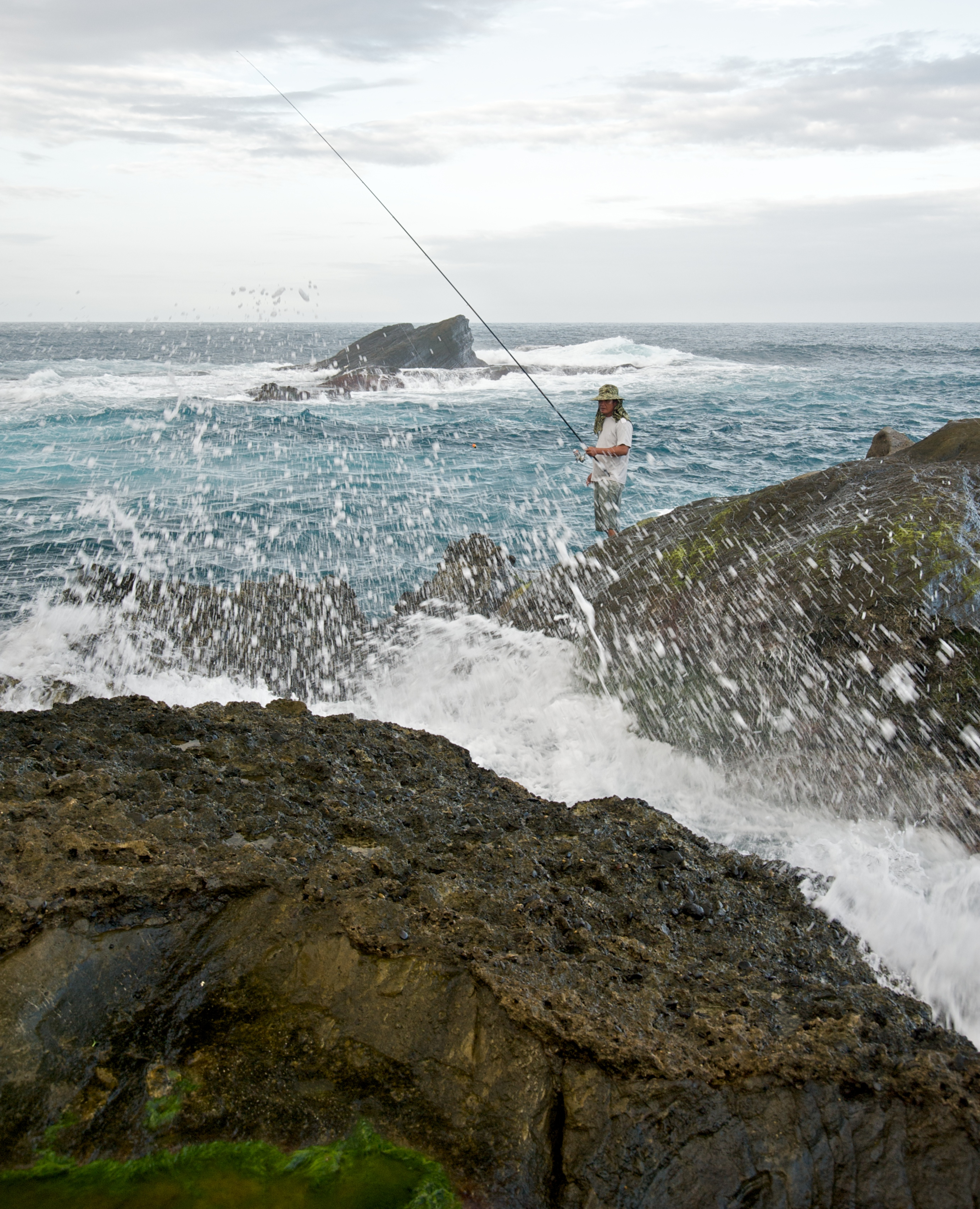
Rock fishing at Shihtiping in Taiwan

Sport fishing or game fishing is recreational fishing activities that focus mainly on the physical exertion and thrilling experience during the process of subduing a hard-fighting fish, which provides the fisherman the excitement of a challenge (a good "sport" or "game") and a satisfying sense of achievement after successfully catching the target. Sport fishing methods vary according to the area fished, the species targeted, the personal strategies of the angler, and the resources available. It ranges from the aristocratic art of fly fishing elaborated in Great Britain to the high-tech methods used to chase large bluewater fish. Sport fishing is usually done with hook, line, rod and reel rather than with nets, traps or other mass-fishing device (e.g., electrofishing), although fishing aids such as hand net, attractor light and fishfinder might be used. Non-angling techniques such as bowfishing and spearfishing are also considered sport fishing.

Among the most common saltwater game fish are predatory fishes such as wahoo, mahi-mahi, tuna, salmon, billfish (marlin, sailfish and swordfish), shark, grouper and mackerel, which can be pursued offshore on a boat, kayak or even from a surfboard, or casting from the shoreline into the surf zone (surf fishing). When fishing from a sea-going boat, groundbait known as "chum" is commonly used to attract fish.

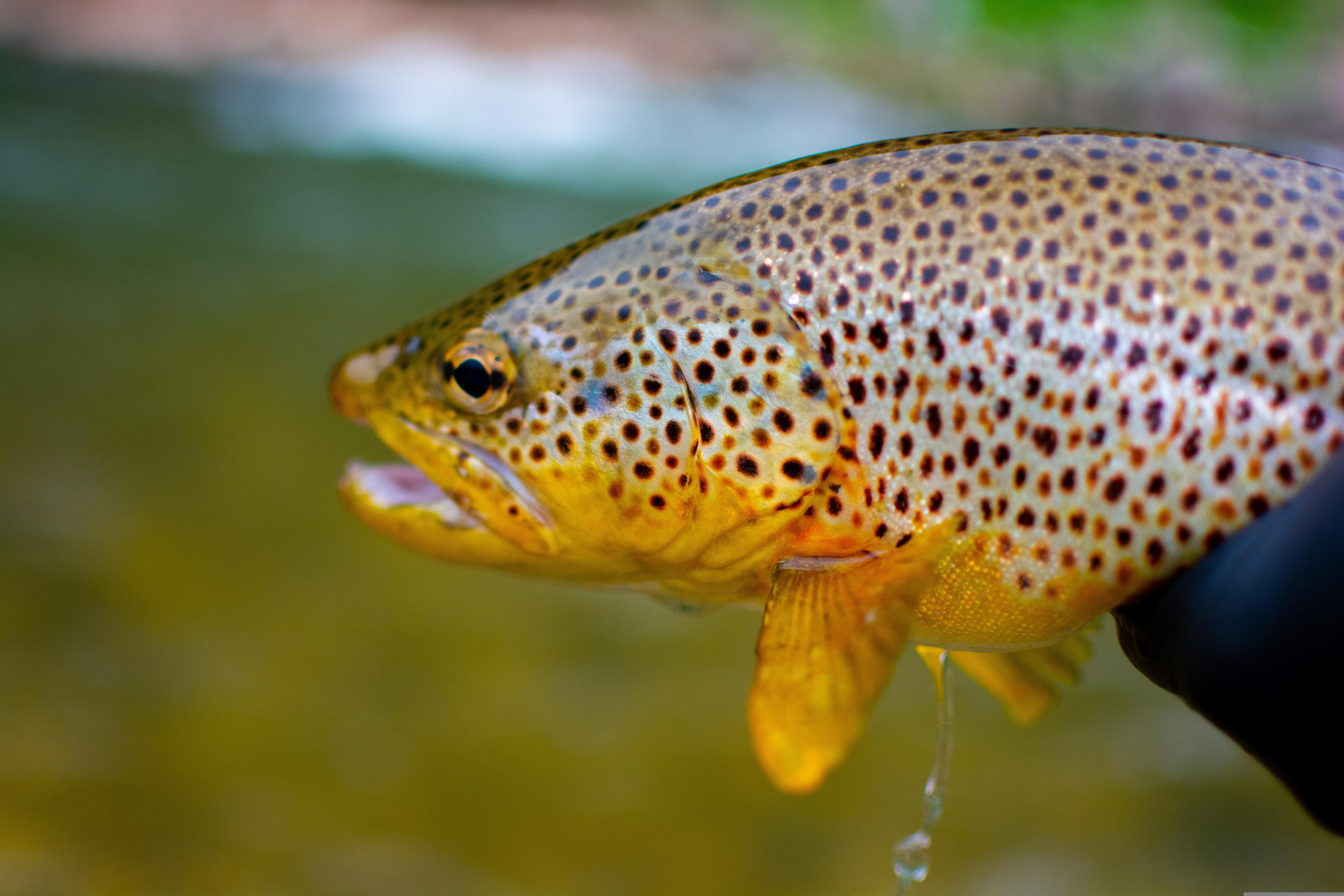
Brown trout

In North America, popular freshwater fish include trout, bass, pike, catfish, walleye and muskellunge. The smallest fish are called panfish, because they can fit whole in a normal cooking pan, examples being perch and sunfish (Centrarchidae).

In the past, sport fishers, even if they did not eat their catch, almost always killed the fish and bring them to shore to be weighed or for preservation as trophies. In order to protect recreational fisheries, sport fishermen now often catch and release, and sometimes tag and release, which involves fitting the fish with identity tags, recording vital statistics, and sending a record to a government agency.

== Fishing techniques ==
Recreational fishing techniques include hand gathering, bowfishing, spearfishing, netting, angling, and trapping.

Most recreational fishers use a fishing rod with a fishing line and a hook at the end of the line. The rod may be equipped with a reel so the line can be reeled in, and some form of bait or a lure attached to the hook. Fly fishing is a special form of rod fishing in which the reel is attached to the back end of the rod, and heavy line is cast with a complex, repetitive whipping motion to deliver the ultra light artificial fly to its target. Another less common technique is bowfishing using a bow or a crossbow. The "arrow" is a modified bolt with barbs at the tip, connected to a fishing line so the fish can be retrieved. Some crossbows are fitted with a reel.

The effective use of fishing techniques often depends on knowledge about the fish and their behaviour including migration, foraging, and habitat. Although there is certainly an element of "luck" to fishing, a recent science-based synthesis article reveals that fish capture is a complex function of three interdependent key processes: an individual fish's internal state, its encounter with the gear, and the characteristics of the encountered gear.

== Fishing tackle ==
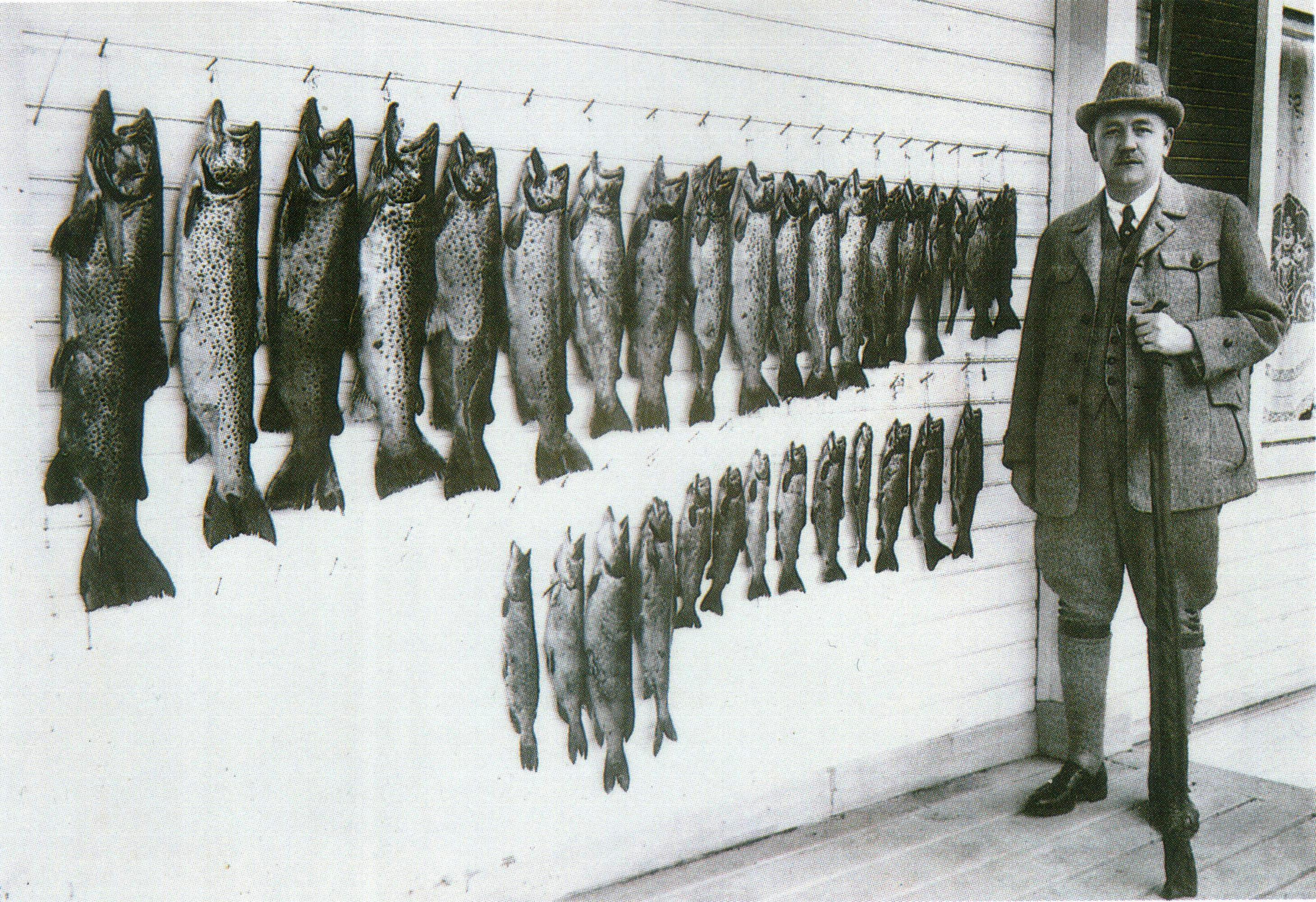
Finnish President L. K. Relander presents his day's catch in Imatra, Finland in the 1920s

Fishing tackle is the equipment used by fishers. Almost any equipment or gear used for fishing can be called fishing tackle. Some examples are hooks, lines, sinkers, floats, rods, reels, baits, lures, arrows, spears, nets, gaffs, traps, waders and tackle boxes.

Tackle that is attached to the end of a fishing line is called terminal tackle. This includes hooks, sinkers, floats, leaders, swivels, split rings and wire, snaps, beads, spoons, blades, spinners and clevises to attach spinner blades to fishing lures. The line, hook, bait and other fishing tackle arranged together form a fishing rig.

Fishing tackle can be contrasted with fishing techniques. Fishing tackle refers to the physical equipment that is used when fishing, whereas fishing techniques refers to the ways the tackle is used when fishing.

== Rules and regulations ==
Recreational fishing has conventions, rules, licensing restrictions and laws that limit the way in which fish may be caught. The International Game Fish Association (IGFA) makes and oversees a set of voluntary guidelines. Typically, these prohibit the use of nets and the catching of fish with hooks not in the mouth. Enforceable regulations are put in place by governments to ensure sustainable practice amongst anglers. For example, in the Republic of Ireland, the Central Fisheries Board oversees the implementation of all angling regulations, which include controls on angling lures, baits and number of hooks permissible, as well as licensing requirements and other conservation-based restrictions. Regulations notwithstanding, voluntary catch and release fishing as a means of protecting and sustaining game species has become an increasingly common practice among conservation-minded recreational anglers. Policy makers have largely ignored the recreational fishing sector but there is now a framework for better engagement to ensure that recreational fisheries receive the same attention as commercial fisheries.

In many places they have their rules in an "anglers' handbook". Each year the handbook is updated and new rules such as catch and release, areas to fish and limits on fish can be found.

In the United States, recreational fishing poses the greatest risk of death from lightning of any activity, accounting for 10 percent of all lightning deaths between 2006 and 2019.

The Constitutional Court of Colombia considers sport fishing as unconstitutional.

== Fish logs ==
Some recreational anglers keep a log of the fish they catch, and submit trophy-sized fish to independent record keeping bodies. In the Republic of Ireland, the Irish Specimen Fish Committee verifies and publicizes the capture of trophy fish caught with rod and line by anglers in Ireland, both in freshwater and at sea. The committee also ratifies Irish record rod caught fish. It uses a set of 'fair play' regulations to ensure fish are caught in accordance with accepted angling norms.

== Competitions ==
Recreational fishing competitions (tournaments) are a recent innovation in which fishermen compete for prizes based on the total weight of a given species of fish caught within a predetermined time. This sport evolved from local fishing contests into large competitive circuits, especially in North America. Competitors are most often professional fishermen who are supported by commercial endorsements. Other competitions are based purely on length with mandatory catch and release. Either longest fish or total length is documented with a camera and a mandatory sticker or unique item, a practice used since it is hard to weigh a living fish accurately in a boat.

Sport fishing competitions involve individuals if the fishing occurs from land, and usually teams if conducted from boats, as well as specified times and areas for catching fish. A score is awarded for each fish caught. The points awarded depend on the fish's weight and species. Occasionally a score is divided by the strength of the fishing line used, yielding more points to those who use thinner, weaker line. In tag and release competitions, a flat score is awarded per fish species caught, divided by the line strength. Usually sport fishing competitions award a prize to the boat or team with the most points earned.

In Australia, a self-administered standard for the environmental assessment of tournament fishing has been proposed as an alternative and possible pathway to the ISO 14001 international standard. The standard assesses environmental, social, economic, and public risk factors. Tournament organizers may apply for voluntary certification. In some US states, fishery agencies and competition organizers create their own codes of practice.

== Industry ==
The recreational fishing industry consists of enterprises such as the manufacture and retailing of fishing tackle, the design and building of recreational fishing boats, and the provision of fishing boats for charter and guided fishing trips.

"Pay to fish" enterprises provide anglers with controlled access to stocked lakes, ponds, or canals. These provide fishing opportunities outside of the permitted seasons and quotas applied to public waters. In the United Kingdom, commercial fisheries of this sort charge access fees. In North America, establishments usually charge for the fish caught, by length or by weight, rather than for access to the site although some establishments charge both types of fees.

Recreational fishing is a multibillion-dollar industry. In the United States in 2014, about 11 million recreational saltwater fishers generated $58 billion in sales impacts. By contrast, commercial fishing generated $141 billion in sales impacts.

== Biological invasions ==
Several species, such as Cichla kelberi, C. piquiti, rainbow trout, Wels catfish, and many species in the family Centrarchidae have been introduced in natural or artificial environmental to the sport fishing. Some of these species have caused several impacts in aquatic biota.

== See also ==
- Angling – Fishing technique
- Artisanal fishing – Traditional labor-intensive fishing
- Bass fishing – Recreational activity targeting North American black bass species
- Big-game fishing – Offshore sportfishing targeting large fish such as tuna or marlin
- Center pin fishing
- Coarse fishing – Type of freshwater angling in the United Kingdom and Ireland
- Environmental effects of fishing
- Fishing knots
- Fishing techniques – Methods for catching sea creatures, especially fish
- Fishing tournament – Fishing contest among a group of anglers
- Game fish – Popular fish targeted in recreational fishing
- History of fishing
- International Game Fish Association
- List of American fishers
- Overfishing – Removal of any species of fish from water at a rate that the species cannot replenish
- Rock fishing – Sea fishing from rocky outcrops
