= Mooch =

Mooch or Mooche may refer to:

== People ==
- Albert "Mooch" Harrell, a member of the Distants (1959–1960), a vocal group related to the Temptations
- Steve Mariucci (born 1955), American football coach and NFL Network analyst, nicknamed "Mooch"
- Glenn Myernick (1954–2006), American soccer player nicknamed "Mooch"
- Anthony Scaramucci (born 1964), American financier and political figure nicknamed "The Mooch"

== Fictional characters ==
- Mooch (Underdog)
- Mooch, a dog in the 1971 television film Mooch Goes to Hollywood
- Mooch, a cat in the comic strip Mutts
- Mooch, a dog in 101 Dalmatians: The Series, a 1997–1998 animated television series
- Mooch, a fox in the 1997–1998 short segment series "Maurice & Mooch" in The Wacky World of Tex Avery, an animated television series
- Mooch, a fly in the 2009 animated film G-Force
- Mike "Mooch" Cacciatore, in Wiseguy, an American 1987-90 crime drama television series

== Other uses ==
- Mooch Goes to Hollywood, also titled Mooch, a 1971 television movie
- Mooch, a dance move in the early 1900s dance Black Bottom
- "The Mooche", a 1928 jazz song sometimes spelled Mooch
- Mooch, or Scaramucci, a period of 10 or 11 days
- Mooch, a person who takes advantage of the help of others, a leech

== See also ==
- Mafeking Mooch, an affected style of walking
- Mooching rod, a fishing rod used in centerpin fishing
- Moochie (disambiguation)
- Moocher (disambiguation)
