= Land-based game fishing =

Land-based game fishing is a form of big-game sport fishing in which anglers attempt to catch oceanic game fish from shore rather than from ocean-going boats. Some areas anglers can game fish from the land include public water-access points such as boat ramps, kayak launches, piers, jetties, and any other public water access. Numerous game fish can be targeted and caught from the shore using a variety of Fishing tackle and Fishing techniques. Land-based game fishing is similar to Surf fishing, however it is not restricted to just fishing the surf from beaches. Tackle used is usually comparable to that used on boats, but some differences are necessary, such as changes in rod length. Different tackle is used according to location and species targeted.

== Species ==
Numerous species can be targeted and caught using a variety of methods and tactics. These game fish vary depending on location and Body of water being fished. Some of the most popular global game fish are:

- Marlin
- Tarpon
- Mahi-mahi
- Swordfish
- Tuna
- Striped bass
- Bluefish
- Shark

== Shark fishing ==
A controversial aspect of land-based game fishing is the shark fishing side of the activity. When land-based shark fishing, anglers target an array of shark species from the shoreline, piers, jetties, etc. Sizable numbers of participants exist in Australia, South Africa and the Gulf and East Coast states of the United States, especially popular in Texas, Florida and North Carolina. The controversial side regards the amount of endangered species one could encounter when fishing for shark from the shore. Roughly 14% of shark species in the Atlantic Ocean were overfished in 2024, and concerns regarding the wellbeing of numerous shark species have become clear. However, there are some species of shark considered to be "game fish," and can potentially be legally targeted and some can even be harvested by land-based anglers. Some species of sharks recognized as "game fish" are Blacktip shark, Bonnethead, and Tiger shark. It is important to research specific location's shark fishing rules and regulations before fishing, as differing rules apply in different U.S. States, and other parts of the world. Additionally, concerns surrounding "chumming" have been raised. Chumming is a fishing method, intending to attract sharks to a specific area being fished utilizing chum.

== Locations ==
The best land-based game fishing is at present restricted to very few areas around the world. The best-known spots are in South Africa, New Zealand, Australia and the Andaman Islands, of which Barren and Narcondam Island have allowed catching marlin from the rocks.

Along the east coast of Australia, land-based game fishing can be divided into two fairly distinct geographic regions. On the north coast of New South Wales, from approximately Sydney northwards, light tackle is generally used, with smaller target species such as longtail tuna, Spanish mackerel and cobia. Particularly noted are the rock platforms of Jervis Bay, where black marlin of up to 91 kg (200 lb) have been caught using bait floated out on balloons. South of Sydney, heavier tackle is used as the target species are generally much larger (due to Bergmann's rule), with the main targets being black marlin, yellowfin tuna, yellowtail kingfish and sharks.

== See also ==
- Surf fishing
- Fishing
