= Freeloader =

Freeloader or Freeloaders may refer to:

- Freeloaders (band), an electronic music act
- Freeloaders (film), a Broken Lizard film
- Freeloader (game), a board game created by Cheapass Games
- Freeloader boot disks, a series of video game boot disks (e.g. the Wii Freeloader)

== See also ==
- Cheating (biology)
- Mooch (disambiguation)
