= Moocher =

Moocher or The Moocher may refer to:

- Moocher, a character in the 1979 film Breaking Away and the subsequent television series
- Moocher McDuck, a character from the Disney Clan McDuck
- Moocher, a character in Gofrette, an animated children's television series
- "The Moocher", a 2000 episode of The Kids from Room 402, an animated television series
- "The Moocher", a bonus track on Lost, a 1998 8Ball album

== See also ==
- "Minnie the Moocher", a 1931 song by Cab Calloway and His Orchestra
- Mr. Moocher, a 1944 The Fox and the Crow animated short film
- Mooch (disambiguation)
