= Fishing rod tapers =

Fishing rod tapers describe how much a fishing rod bends or flexes under pressure. Different tapers are used for different fishing scenarios as well as for personal preference.

== Action ==
The action of a taper is described by the flex of the tip of a rod when pressure is applied perpendicular to the rod. Only a section of the rod starting at the tip of the rod should bend while the remainder of the rod should stay rigid.

Variations can be described in three main categories, fast, medium, or slow with variations in between each. A rod with a fast taper will only flex the top 20 percent. Medium fast and medium tapers will flex approximately 30 to 60 percent of the rod respectively. If the rod has a slow taper, almost the entire rod or blank will bend or flex under pressure.

== Usage ==
Rod taper is important for several reasons. The feel for the lure being used and the fish being caught dictate the appropriate taper use.

A fast action tip will be used when fishing jig type lures. The angler can feel and therefore control what the lure is doing quite easily. Since only the very tip of the rod bends, when a fish strikes the angler has ample rod shaft and backbone to set the hook correctly.

In contrast to fast tapers, the slow flex rods offer the angler advantages when fighting large fish with light fishing line. This additional flex allows the rod to absorb the force of the fish as opposed to the line. This is often the angler who likes to fish split shot rigs or Lindy rigs for walleye.
