= Surf fishing =

Land-based game fishing technique

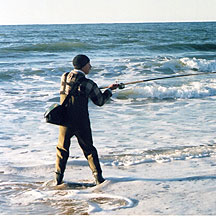
Surf Fisherman

Surf fishing is land-based game fishing while standing on the shoreline or wading into the surf zone. A general term, surf fishing may or may not include casting a lure or bait, and refers to all types of shore fishing – from sandy and rocky beaches, rock jetties, or even fishing piers. The terms surfcasting or beachcasting refer more specifically to surf fishing from the beach by casting into the surf at or near the shoreline. With few exceptions, surf fishing is done in saltwater. The most common misconception about surf fishing is the idea that one must cast as far out as possible in order to reach the fish. At beaches on the west coast of the United States, and in fact, at most beaches around the world, one only needs to get their bait into knee-deep water. This is referred to as surf fishing the "skinny" (the skinny water).

== Equipment ==
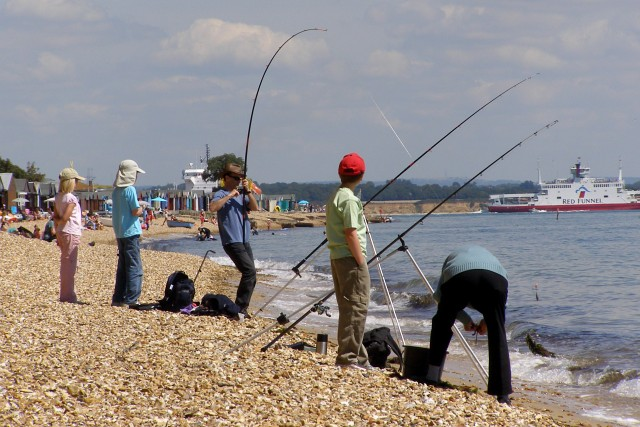
Surf fishing at Calshot, Hampshire

The basic idea of most surfcasting is to cast a bait or lure as far out into the water as is necessary to reach the target fish from the shore. This may or may not require long casting distances. Basic surf fishing can be done with a fishing rod between 7 feet and 18 feet long, with an extended butt section, equipped with a suitably-sized spinning or conventional (revolving spool) casting reel. In addition to rod and reel, the surf fisherman needs terminal tackle and bait or lure. Terminal tackle is the equipment at the far end of the line: hooks, swivels, lines and leaders.

Surf fishing rigs like the snood rig are essential tools for anglers targeting fish from shorelines and beaches. The snood rig, known for its effectiveness in turbulent surf conditions, consists of multiple hooks branching off the main line, each attached to shorter lines called snoods. This setup helps present bait at various depths in the water column, increasing the chances of attracting fish that may be feeding closer to the bottom or higher up in the water. The snood rig's versatility makes it ideal for adapting to different surf conditions and fish behaviors, ensuring anglers have a better chance of success in catching a variety of species from the shore.

Dedicated surfcasters usually possess an array of terminal and other tackle, with fishing rods and reels of different lengths and actions, and lures and baits of different weights and capabilities. Depending on fishing conditions and the type of fish they are trying to catch, such surfcasters tailor bait and terminal tackle to rod and reel and the size and species of fish targeted. Reels and other equipment need to be constructed so they resist the corrosive and abrasive effects of salt and sand.

Surf fishermen who use artificial lures, cast and retrieve them to entice a bite from the target species. There are hundreds of different lures effective for surf fishing, such as spoons, plugs, soft plastics and jigs. Most can be purchased from local bait and tackle shops, online tackle retailers, at fishing tackle expositions or specialized surf fishing catalogs. Most surfcasters carry with them a "surf bag" which holds a selection of lures to facilitate fast changes of lures appropriate to current fishing conditions, saving trips back to the beach or vehicle to change equipment.

Several other items of equipment are commonly used by surf fisherman and surfcasters to improve comfort, convenience, and effectiveness. Among these are waders, used to wade out into the surf to gain distance from shore when casting the bait. Full length, chest-high waders are most popular, in order to provide a measure of protection against a pounding surf that could easily swamp hip-length wading boots. In addition to the extra reach provided by wading out from shore, waders provide improved footing, protection for feet and legs from sharp bottom objects and stinging/biting fish and crustaceans, and protection from cold water temperatures. Most surf fishermen prefer integrated booted waders to stocking-foot models, which eliminates the tendency of sand and rock to find their way in between boot and wader. In areas where the bottom consists of slippery rocks or when fishing from mossy and slimy rock jetties, cleated boots or attachments are utilized to improve footing and enhance safety.

Surf fishing is done often at night to follow the nocturnal feeding habits of many target species. Many surf fishermen add items such as flashlights, headlamps, light sticks and other gear to facilitate night fishing.

When surf fishing, it is practical to evaluate the amount of terminal tackle required for the conditions. Minimizing excess gear reduces the environmental impact on marine ecosystems in the event of a line break.

== Surfcasting ==
Surfcasting is a casting technique which separates the surfcaster from the ordinary shore, pier, or boat fisherman. Extremely long rods are frequently employed to extend the length of the cast, while specialized, two-handed casting techniques are used to cast the lure or bait the added distances required in many cases to reach feeding inshore fish. In these casts the entire body, rather than just the arms, are utilized to deliver the cast. In addition to standard two-handed casts, veteran surfcasters may also resort to the pendulum cast (derived from tournament casting contests) to achieve added distance – in some cases exceeding 700 feet.

Tournament casting is a sport in its own right, with the world record held by Danny Moeskops casting a distance of 286.63 meters (313.46 yards).

Extreme Surfcasting also known as skishing is a variant of surf fishing that involves donning a wetsuit and flippers and swimming into the ocean with surfcasting pole to catch fish. Skishing was invented in Montauk, New York in 1995. The term which is a cross between "skiing "and "fishing" to describe what happens if the angler hooks a large enough fish and it tows him through the ocean like a water-skier. Without the benefit of boat or land, the fight is considered to be, by the fisherman anyway, on more equal terms. Skishers swim sometimes hundreds of yards from shore to water well over their heads, with their flippers and buoyancy of their wetsuits keeping them afloat.

Wetsuit Surfcasting is considered another form of extreme surfcasting, in which an angler dons a wetsuit with spikes on their feet, and swims to a rock from which they fish for striped bass. This differs from "skishing" in that the angler remains perched on structure rather than floating. The target fish however remains the same. This form of surfcasting has long attracted highly particular personalities: cranks, combat veterans, and adrenaline junkies and is thought to have been pioneered in the mid-1900s in Montauk, NY by anglers such as Jack Yee and Fred Kalkstein. The tradition is still practiced today amongst a new generation of anglers, and in recent years has become popularized by a "dying breed" of surfcasters namely Brandon Sausele, a pipeline rehabilitation specialist who regularly wetsuit surfcasts the waters off Montauk, NY. In recent years an increase in local shark populations and encounters, has added another dynamic to the extreme sport.

== Beachcasting ==
In Britain, surfcasting is often called beachcasting. It is a popular form of fishing which is carried out all around the coast of the British Isles. Beachcasters use very long fishing rods, usually between 12 and 16 feet. The beachcaster will stand on a beach or shoreline and cast out to sea with either a water filled float, or a lead weight weighing between 120g and 200g. Bait used in this form of fishing might include limpets, mussels, lugworm, ragworm, sandeel, mackerel strip, squid, peeler crab or razor fish. Additionally, artificial flies or even spinners may be used for species such as mackerel or bass. It is a common pastime in coastal areas of Scotland, England, Wales, and Ireland and often results in the capture of large specimens of many species of fish, including: flatfish, bass, cod, whiting, pollack, black bream, dogfish, smooth hound, bull huss, rays, and tope.

Common beachcasting techniques used in Britain include the common overhead cast, the off-the-ground Cast, and the Pendulum cast. There are other techniques used in Britain, but these three techniques remain the more popular ones with the pendulum cast perhaps the most difficult to master and also the one that generally produces more yards to the cast with 250–300 yds becoming quite possible. On top of technique and equipment, streamlines rigs that can take casting strains are also used such as the clipped pennel pulley, clipped down rigs, long n low etc. The rigs are also made with strong 60 lb plus lines to take the strain of the cast. Streamlining of bait too is important. A shockleader is a stronger line attached to a lighter mainline to absorb the shock of a powerful cast. The suggested formula for shockleader selection is as calculated as follows 1 oz weight +10lb shockleader + 10lb, e.g.

Besides the equipment and the cast techniques, the other component that makes a beach caster successful is what can be called sea interpretation. There are zones, and within them certain points, where to cast the baits is more profitable than others. It depends on the conformation of the sea bed, and therefore, in order to make fishing more effective and enjoyable, we should spend a while on understanding these differences and only then start fishing. How? First of all, by observing the waves motion, in particular where they break out, because it is there where the bottom height is lower and the sea current can stir it most. This action uncovers from the sandy bed small marine beings and carry them away across channels to deeper points, where they settle in for the joy of fish. The latter, that tend to swim countercurrent, move searching for food along these channels – that can be compared in some way to our roads in a map – and approach the shore as long as the conditions allow the marine food chain to last. Although it may seem an oversimplification of the reality, it makes clear that only when a beach caster is able to master the "sense of sea" by spotting the difference among fishing zones, then will he be more likely to make memorable captures. Similarly to any other activity, it's a matter of experience, which can be acquired by getting through several failures.

== Dangers ==
As with any water sport care must be taken to participate safely in this sport. Much surf fishing is done in rough whitewater surf conditions. Powerful waves and strong undertows can cause serious injury or death if proper attention is not paid to safety.

Areas fished should be scouted in low tide conditions to note sudden drop offs or dangerous conditions hidden at high tides. Any fisherman with waders should wear a wader belt to keep waders from filling with water in the event one falls in the surf. The aforementioned cleats should be worn anywhere there are slippery rocks or shells underfoot. PFD's (personal flotation devices) should be considered especially when fishing alone in big surf or on jetties.

Fishing lures and hooks are designed with sharp points. To prevent injury to oneself or others during use, it is necessary to maintain a clear safety zone, particularly when performing high-power, two-handed casts.

== Species ==
A wide array of species can be targeted from surf and shore limited only the species of fish available in the region. On the west coast of the United States, a few of the most sought after fish include the California Corbina, the Spotfin Croaker, the Barred Surfperch, and of course, the California Halibut. Unlike the east coast, the west coast is limited when it comes to shark fishing from the surf. Commonly caught sharks include the Leopard Shark, the Soupfin Shark, and the Seven-gill Shark. In the eastern coast of the United States, the striped bass is highly valued. This species can be fished from shore and ranges in weight from a few pounds to the world record 78.5 lb (35.6 kg). Fish in the 30 to 40 lb (15 kg) range are common on the mid-Atlantic U.S. coast from New York to the Carolinas. Some other available species are bluefish, redfish (red drum), black drum, tautog (blackfish), flounder (fluke), weakfish (sea trout), bonito and albacore tuna, pompano, Spanish mackerel, snook, and tarpon. Even sharks can be targeted by surf fishermen.

From North Carolina south the redfish (red drum) is one of the most targeted fish by surf anglers. Fishermen use rods 10 to 13 feet to cast to drum using baits like cut mullet, bunker (cut menhaden, or pogies as Carolina anglers call them), and cut bait from spot, croaker, or bluefish. Red drum hit bait aggressively and are a much beloved surf fishing species. The overfished status of this fish for many years due to the blackened redfish craze of the 1980s led to strict recreational size and creel limits, however, so surf anglers must learn the local rules.

== Beach buggies ==
Many areas allow four-wheel-drive (4WD) vehicles on to the beach. This allows the surf fisherman to scout and fish large stretches of shoreline. Although the term "beach buggy" may be applied to special vehicles for transportation on sand, 4x4 trucks and SUV's with deflated tires are more often used in surf fishing. Permits are usually required and need to be obtained from the appropriate state or local authorities. Most require an additional list of safety and other equipment, sometimes called Beach Permit Kits to ensure that the vehicle and its inhabitants can safely navigate the soft sand and are prepared in the event the vehicle gets stuck. Beach Buggy access can be hindered at times by beach closures, due to endangered bird species nesting. Beach buggy access is often hotly contested between environmental groups, and beach access enthusiasts. Therefore, it is a good idea to check on local regulations before you attempt to drive your vehicle on the beach. Driving in restricted areas can result in serious penalties.

== See also ==
- Coastal fish
- Land-based shark fishing
- Net casting
- Spey casting
- Reach cast
- Rock fishing
