= Sakasa Kebari =

Artificial fly

- Artificial fly
- Pheasant tail Sakasa Kebari
- Type: Tenkara method general attractor wet fly
- Imitates: Aquatic nymphs

History
- Creator: Unknown
- Created: Unknown

Materials
- Typical sizes: 16 - 12
- Typical hooks: Scud or curved
- Body: Pheasant tail
- Ribbing: Copper wire
- Hackle: Pheasant
- Thorax: Peacock herl

Uses
- Primary use: Trout, char

The Sakasa Kebari or reverse-hackle fly, is an artificial fly most associated with the Japanese style of tenkara fishing but can be used in most freshwater fly fishing. The Sakasa Kebari is usually defined by firstly, its reverse hackle and secondly, by its simplicity as compared to western style flies. This fly was originally created to be used in the small, high gradient streams in Japan while fishing for native trout and char.

One of the main differences between Sakasa Kebari style flies and their western counterparts is that while western style flies tend to mimic specific insects in as much detail as can be accomplished the Sakasa Kebari is more impressionistic, what is often called an attractor fly. Instead of trying to incorporate an insect's details, it tends to be more general, allowing the target fish to 'connect the dots'.

== Philosophy ==
The philosophy behind tenkara fishing is in keeping things as simple as possible and this is reflected in the style of the flies most used in tenkara fishing. The flies tend to be tied with a minimum of material, usually only one feather and thread. This simplicity actually allows the flies to be tied streamside with no tools other than what the typical fly fisherman would carry while on the water although they are most often tied at a tying bench.

== Construction ==
This fly was originally created and used by sustenance fishermen in Japan, hence its minimalistic construction. A quick and easy to build fly suited their purposes more so than a fly that required hard to get materials and a major investment in time. The most iconic version of the Sakasa Kebari is tied using nothing more than a hook, thread, and a feather, usually a pheasant feather. The hooks tend to be between sizes 16 through 12, the body being made solely with the thread, and the feather being wound around the front portion of the hook with the barbels angled forward, toward the eye, as opposed to backward the way most western flies are tied.

While the Sakasa Kebari tends toward a simplistic tying approach there are many variants that are more complex. Some use a combination of silk, pheasant tail fibers, wire ribbing, and other materials to construct the body. While most are unweighted, bead heads and lead wrapping can be used to apply weight so the fly can be fished deeper than otherwise possible. While the Sakasa Kebari is usually associated with being a wet fly (a fly that is fished beneath the surface) it can also be fished dry (on the surface) simply by modifying technique, applying floatant, or even using a dry fly hackle instead of the standard wet fly hackle.

== Variants ==
While Sakasa Kebari all have similar attributes, such as the reverse hackle and a simpler construction than their western counterparts there are many different variations. The sustenance fisherman that used these flies tended to live in remote villages that were somewhat isolated from other fishing villages. They began to construct regional variations of these flies, this had more to do with the available materials and not so much with one variant working better than another.

=== Ishigaki Sakasa Kebari ===
This is the fly used by the Japanese tenkara master Dr. Hisao Ishigaki. He ties this fly with nothing more than regular sewing thread and a rooster feather. About the only changes he makes to the fly are differing colors of thread and feather. Dr. Ishigaki is a strong proponent of the 'one fly' approach to tenkara fishing

=== Amano Sakasa Kebari ===
This fly is used by another tenkara master, Katsutoshi Amano. It is very similar to the Ishigaki Sakasa Kebari but uses a pheasant feather instead of a rooster hackle. The pheasant feather is more supple and webbier and gives the fly a different action when in the water. Mr. Amano is one of the longest living practitioners of tenkara in Japan. He ties this fly using no vise, only his hands and using eyeless hooks.

=== Takayama Sakasa Kebari ===
The Takayama Sakasa Kebari, in addition to thread and a pheasant feather, also uses peacock herl for the thorax of the fly. This gives it a bit more iridescence in the water. Peacock herl is a very popular material in both tenkara and western style fly tying.

=== Other unique Sakasa Kebari ===
Tenkara anglers in Japan have been known to create unique fly patterns using alternative materials. For example, Mr. Hisanobu Hirata, in Gifu prefecture created a fly using snake skin for the body. Other anglers have also been known to harvest the fuzzy material of a flowering fern, the Zenmai, found in Japan to tie a fly with a fuzzier body, similar to dubbing, but out of plant material.

== Technique ==
While the Sakasa Kebari tends to be fished dead drifted (allowing the fly to simply drift with the current) like its western counterparts many people fish the fly with a variety of movements, such as pulsating the fly, pausing the fly, and allowing the fly to drift downstream and across the current (much like fishing western style wet flies).

Tenkara fishing (where the Sakasa Kebari is most used) tends to have a ‘one fly’ philosophy. Instead of ‘matching the hatch’ the Sakasa Kebari tends to be a more impressionistic fly, it roughly mimics a large variety of insects and not one in particular. With this in mind the fly is not swapped for other flies as often (or ever) as is done in western fly fishing. The focus is on the technique and not the fly. Changing the fly's action and presentation tend to be done instead of changing the fly itself. There are many tenkara fishers that use the same fly all time and simply adapt their approach as needed. Dr. Ishigaki is a prime example, he uses one fly for practically all of his fishing.

The Sakasa Kebari was designed for use in Japan's small high gradient mountain streams. The moving water would often mean a fish doesn't have long to look at the fly and make a decision on whether to eat it. As this was the case there was no need to mimic any one type of insect, a more impressionistic fly, one that mimicked an assortment of insects, tended to be more reliable. The reverse hackle would open and close as the fly drifted in the turbulent waters instead of simply closing on itself the way most western style wet flies would in those conditions. Flies designed in the same style, with the reverse hackle, have been known to be used in other parts of the world where stream fishing is popular.

== See also ==
- Tenkara fishing
- Fly fishing
- Artificial fly
