= Reach cast =

Casting technique in fly fishing

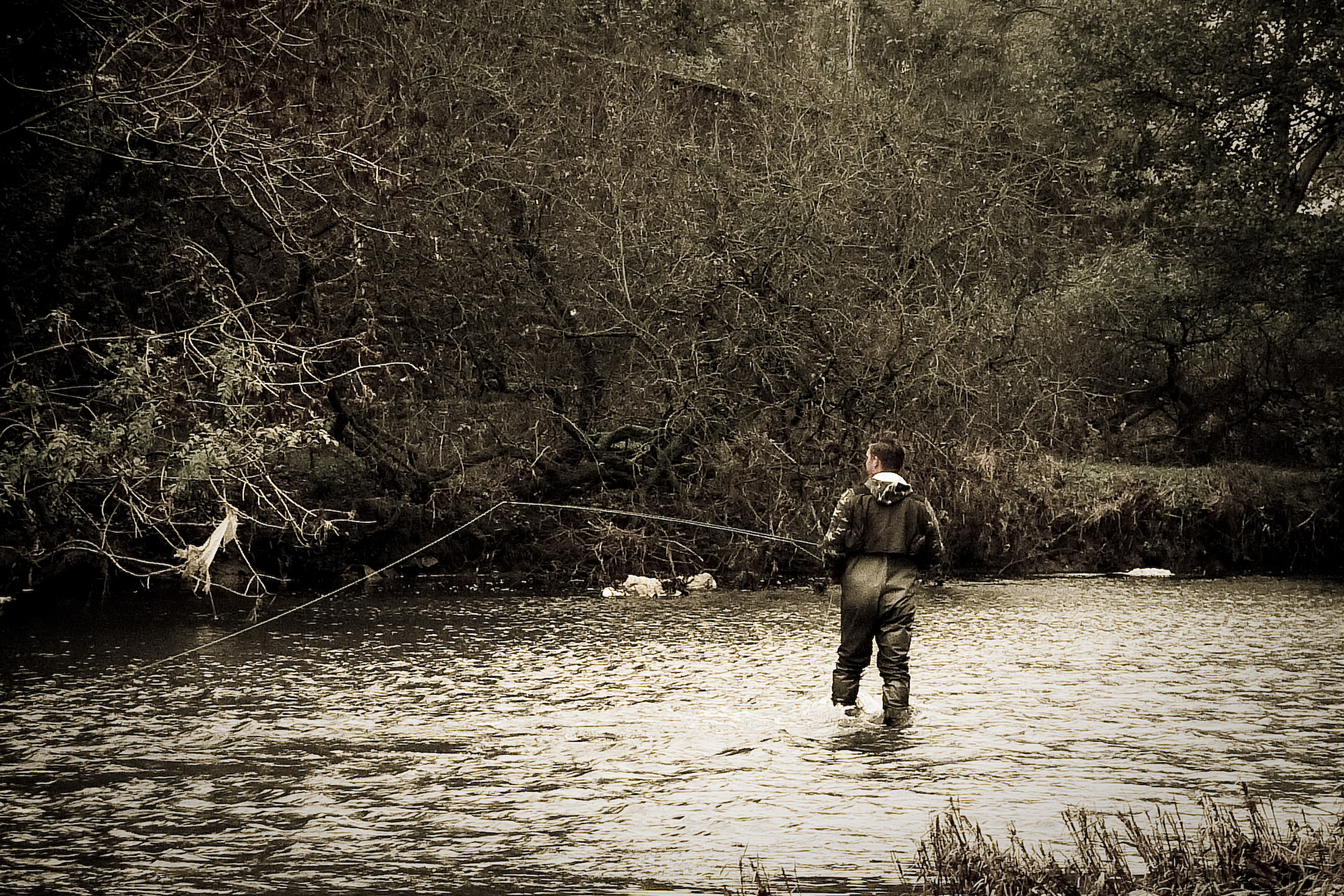
Reach cast technique in fly fishing

The reach cast is a casting technique used in fly fishing. The reach cast involves casting the fly lure over flowing water, such as a stream, and then just before the fly lands, moving the arm and fly rod in the upstream direction to arrange the fishing line so that it produces less apparent drag in the water. The technique allows the lure to more closely resemble a free-floating insect, resulting in greater chance of it being taken by a fish. Reach casting also allows an experienced caster to pitch curved casts in order to get the lures into difficult places.

Reach casting is most commonly used in fishing freshwater streams for trout although the reach cast is also used in some saltwater fishing where one can stand in the shallows and there is a consistent current moving in one direction.

A reach cast is considered a type of mend during the casting stroke, an in-air mend prior to the fly landing in the water. Without this cast adjustment, the line would grow taut immediately upon impact with the moving water's surface and would pull the fly against the current or across it, making its motion become more unnatural to the fish seeking an insect that has just landed on the water.

In many streams, current may flow more slowly along the edges where it is shallower and there is drag introduced by the shore, and surface-feeding trout and other fish tend to linger in the still part of the water. When casting a line across a stream, the line can land in the swifter-running portion of the current, and would pull against the fly lure that lands in the slower-moving water. The reach cast introduces some slack to compensate for the faster-moving water, allowing the fly to land and move more like a floating insect.

== See also ==
- Spey casting
