= Japanese Flies =

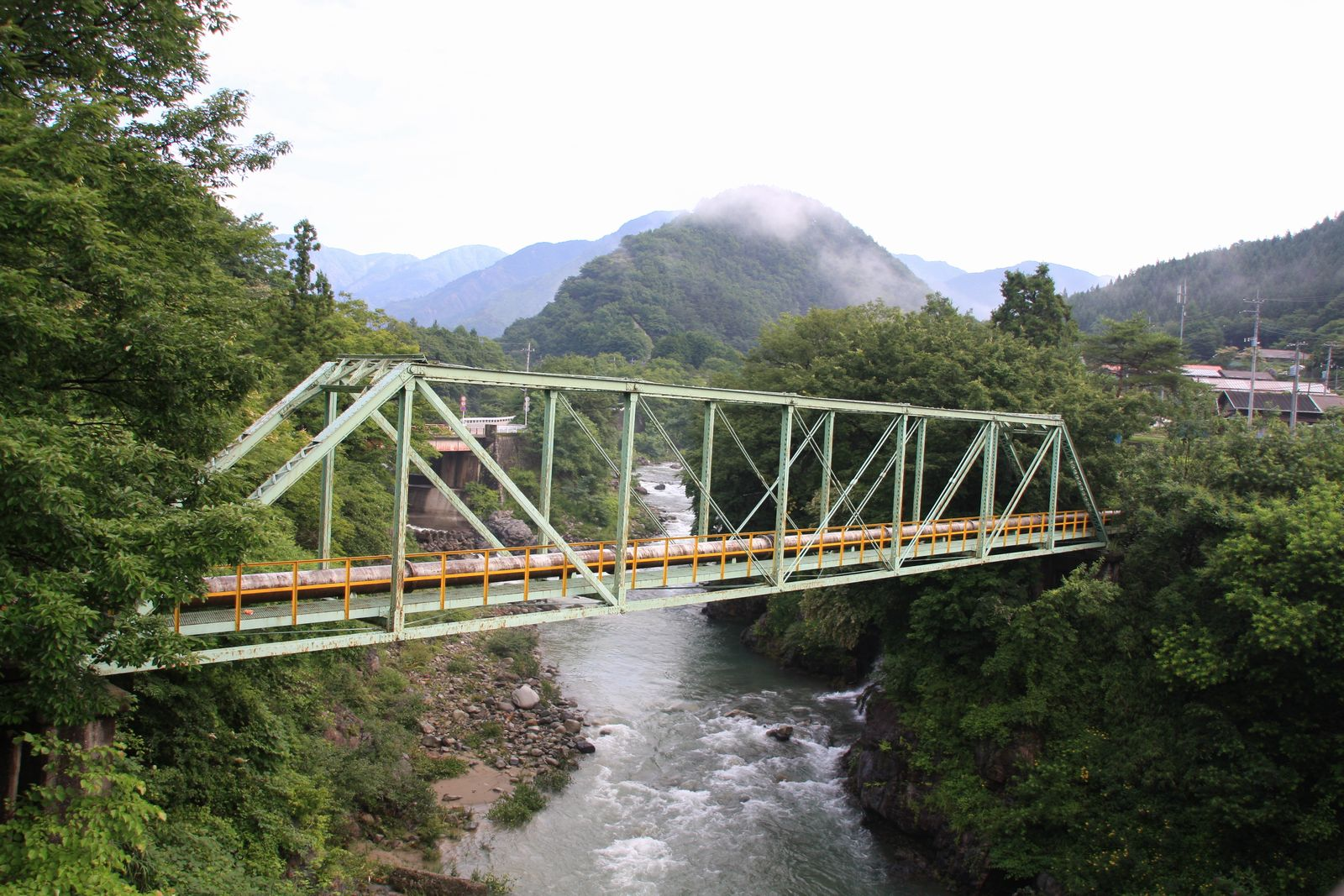
Ashiomachi

In fly fishing, Japanese Flies are artificial flies commonly found within many fishermen's tackle box in Japan. In addition to the usual lure variations of fishing grounds chosen by the fishermen and standard materials used in many regions, several differences are seen in the overall construction when compared to Western-style flies. Feathers, yarns and furs are all used, some of the most popular being peacock feathers, chicken down and neck feathers, and black wool. Some flies are even tied with thin copper wire to add extra weight so they can sink in fast-moving mountain waters. These special flies are mainly used in the Nikkō National Park area near Ashio, Tochigi Prefecture (前日光足尾).

== Description ==
Sakasa Kebari tenkara fly

Many flies are tied in “reverse hackle” meaning the hackle of the fly fans forward towards the eye of the hook instead of down the hook. In Japanese this is referred to as a “Sakasakebari (さかさけばり)” fly. Some rare flies used in the Okumino Itoshiro (奥美濃石徹白) area even have down feathers incorporated in their design. These flies are not known to float well, so instead they are mainly used as wet flies for shallow waters.

Japanese's flies are mainly tied to represent an insect that is common to an area instead of replicating insects. Americans focus more on details in their flies so the fly is as similar to the real thing as possible. The Japanese instead use materials with colors that could represent a large range of insects. Although this is a large difference between both arts of fly tying, both have been very effective in catching fish. Japanese fly designs are even used to fish many types of trout. Japanese fly tying is also seen as an art and in many ways has been expanded on specifically for the purpose of creating. Wild colors, materials, and textures are used to create exocentric flies for exhibitions and shows.
