= Moochie =

Moochie may refer to:

- Kevin Corcoran (1949–2015), American child actor, director and producer nicknamed "Moochie"
- Martyn Moochie Norris (born 1973), American basketball coach and former National Basketball Association player
- Moochie, nickname of the lead character in the 1959 film The Shaggy Dog and the 1994 film The Shaggy Dog
- Moochie, one of the dog actors who played Benji
- Moochie Dixon (born 2001), American football player

== See also ==
- Moochi
