= Spey casting =

Fishing technique

Spey casting is a casting technique used in fly fishing. Spey casting can be accomplished with either a normal length fly rod, or a rod referred to as a double-handed fly rod, often called a Spey rod. Spey rods can also be used for standard overhead casting. Spey casting differentiates itself from other fly fishing techniques as it has no back-cast (the fly never goes behind the caster).

Spey casting is used for fishing large rivers for salmon and large trout such as steelhead and sea trout. The spey technique is also used in saltwater surf casting. All of these situations require the angler to cast larger flies long distances. The two-handed Spey technique allows for more powerful casts, but even one-handed spey casting helps avoid obstacles like high banks or rock faces on the shore by keeping most of the line in front of the angler.

== History ==
There are two categories of D loop casts: the double and the single motion. In the case of the single motion, a redirected D loop is formed with a singular movement, such as seen in the (upstream wind cast) single Spey. This technique originated on the rivers of Scotland. On the other hand the double motion cast which involves, for example, a 45-degree change in direction, is achieved through a double motion cast (downstream wind cast) like the snake-cast. The double motion cast finds its origins in Wales. Its important to note that the Welsh Throw has no connection to the river Spey or the Spey cast, these are two distinct styles from the early 1800s The name "spey cast" comes from the river Spey in Scotland, where this style of casting was popularized due to the river's large width and difficult river bed footing (fishers are mostly unable to wade out into the river). This style of casting originally went by the name of the under-handed cast. When spey casting was introduced, 22-foot (6.7 m) rods called the "Great Vibration" created by rod-maker Alexander Grant of Inverness were used. These rods were made of spliced greenheart, a heavy wood imported from British Guyana. Today, rods are only 12 to 15 feet (3.7 to 4.6 m) in length, and can toss a line up to 80 feet (24 m).

== Overview of Spey casts ==
There are two groups of spey casts: the "splash and go" and the "waterborne anchor". Splash and go casts contain a backstroke that is in the air. The line then falls to the water, and the forward cast starts as soon as the tip of the line touches the water. The waterborne anchor casts are different, as they contain a back-cast that stays on the water. In these types of casts, there is no requirement to achieve perfect timing in order to forward cast after.

While there are many variations of the spey cast, the basic technique is broken down into a few simple actions. With the fly line floating directly downstream, the angler first lifts the line off the water with the tip of the rod. The angler then sweeps the line backwards just above the water, and allows just the fly and leader to "anchor" the cast by touching the water one to two rod lengths away. This back-cast is often referred to as the "D-loop", from the curving shape of the line between the anchor and the tip of the rod. While swinging the "D-loop", it is important to make one continuous, deliberate motion with the rod tip climbing at a 45-degree angle off the water. As the D-loop comes around, the cast is completed by firing the line forward with a sharp two-handed "push-pull" motion on the handle of the rod while making an abrupt stop with the rod tip at the end of the cast. The cast is most easily compared to a roll cast in one-handed fly fishing, although by using the fly as an anchor, a spey cast allows a greater loading of the rod and thus achieves greater distance than a one-handed cast.

Some casters prefer to use a two-handed rod when spey casting because the longer rods can cast farther and offer greater control of the fly. Two-handed rods tend to be about 10'6" (3.2 m) to 16' (4.9 m) in length and weigh more than one-handed rods. The added length makes mending casts and controlling the line much easier. Using a two-handed rod can also benefit fishers who suffer from tennis elbow or other joint problems, as fishers can cast far without as much effort as a one-handed rod.

== Styles of Spey casting ==
The two most commonly used styles of spey casting are the "Single Spey" and the "Double Spey". Mastering both the Single Spey cast and the Double Spey cast will be essential if the fly caster is to be able to cast from either bank of the river in any amount of wind.

=== Single Spey casting ===
The Single Spey cast may be considered better by some, as it casts the line further, and it can be used with winds blowing upstream (which often causes fishers much difficulty when casting). Many spey casters consider this style more efficient than other types. It is used to change directions with a long line when many obstacles are behind the fisher. The Single Spey cast is part of the "Splash and Go" (or touch & Go/Kiss & Go) group of casts.

=== Double Spey casting ===
The Double Spey cast may be considered easier to perform than the Single Spey, but only because this cast can be performed more slowly and deliberately, and corrections are more easily made during elements of the cast. It is a sustained anchor cast in that some of the fly line stays in contact with the water at all times until the final forward casting stroke is made. This Double Spey cast is useful in scenarios with a long line, downstream winds, and obstacles behind the fisher. This cast is included in the waterborne anchor group.

== World records ==
The world's longest 15 ft 1 in (4.60 m) single spey cast was made by Geir Hansen from Norway. The cast measured 65.5 metres (215 ft), and was made during the Hemsedal Spey Competition in 2021. Hansen also set the world record for the 18ft class, with a 77.0 metres (252.6 ft) cast, at the same event.

Anita Strand, a Norwegian Spey fisher, set the previous women's record four-cast total of 560 feet (170 m) in 2023 at the Golden Gate Angling and Casting Club's Spey-O-Rama competition, with her longest cast being 143 feet (44 m).

In the 2025 Spey-O-Rama competition, Whitney Gould set the new record in the women's four-cast total, with 585 feet (178 m) total, and a 154 foot (47 m) longest cast.

Japan's Sasanuma Taishi recorded a total of 238 metres (781 ft) with four casts in a Spey-O-Rama rules SACC competition held in Sayama.

== See also ==
- Reach cast
- Surf fishing
