= Centerpin fishing =

Centerpin fishing, also called float fishing or center pin fishing, is a fishing technique which uses a centerpin rod, a centerpin reel, and Roe, or an artificial fly. The method is used for steelhead fishing in fresh water, and is currently popular with freshwater salmon anglers who drift floats downstream.
