= Fishing swivel =

Angling device

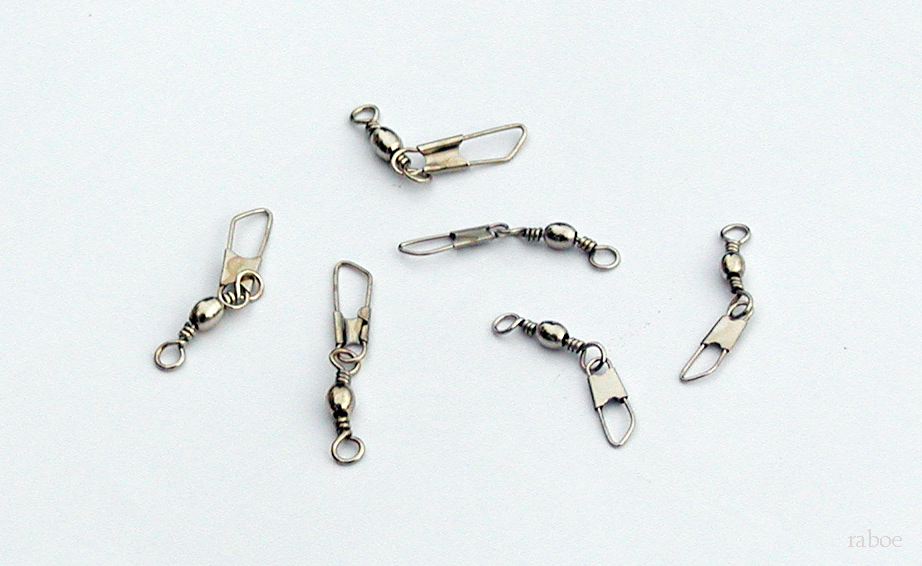
Some snap fishing swivels

A fishing swivel is a small, usually ball- or barrel-shaped device used in angling to connect sections of fishing lines, consisting of two rings linked via a thrust bearing pivot joint. The line from the rod and reel is tied to the ring at proximal end, and the line leading to the terminal tackles (the hook, lure and/or sinker) is tied to the other ring at the distal end. Snap swivels have a safety pin-like fastener (i.e. "snap hook") linked to at least one of the rings, which allows quick detachment and interchanging of different lures.

The main purpose of the swivel is to allow the two line sections to rotate independently of each other, which allows self-unwinding of any twists formed during line casting and retrieval, preventing undesirable tanglings. This is particularly important for users of monofilament fishing lines that tend to express memory and form coils when released from a fixed-spool reel. A secondary benefit of the fishing swivel is that it may function as a stopper for sliding sinkers, which depending on fishing method may be placed before or after the swivel. Three-way swivels provide an additional ring that serves as a point of connection for side-branching line segments, which are essential for certain line and hook setups.

The presence of the swivel has been said to detract from the effectiveness of some types of lures. Depending on the position of the lure, the hooks can become entangled in various ways with the swivel. It is also noted that swivels can serve as weak points on the line, and therefore lessen the likelihood of landing larger or harder fighting fish.

Fishing swivels, usually made of metal, come in sizes ranging from a few millimeters to several centimeters, and are traditionally either anodized black or brass in color. More modern swivels can be obtained in lustrous red and blue varieties. It is somewhat possible that the swivel color plays a role in attracting fish, especially in low-light conditions.
