= Fishing rod =

Angling tool

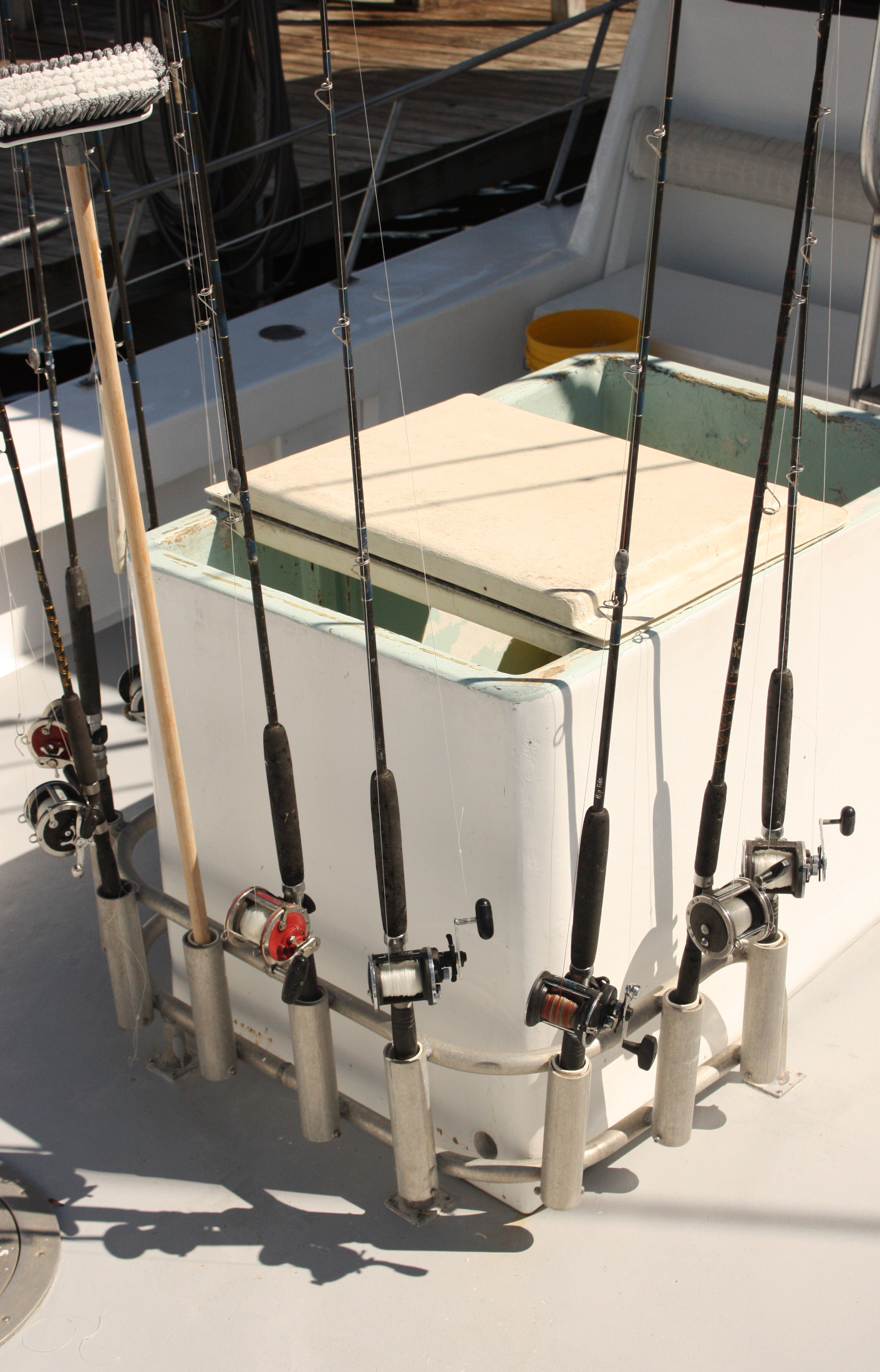
A collection of fishing rods

A fly fishing rod

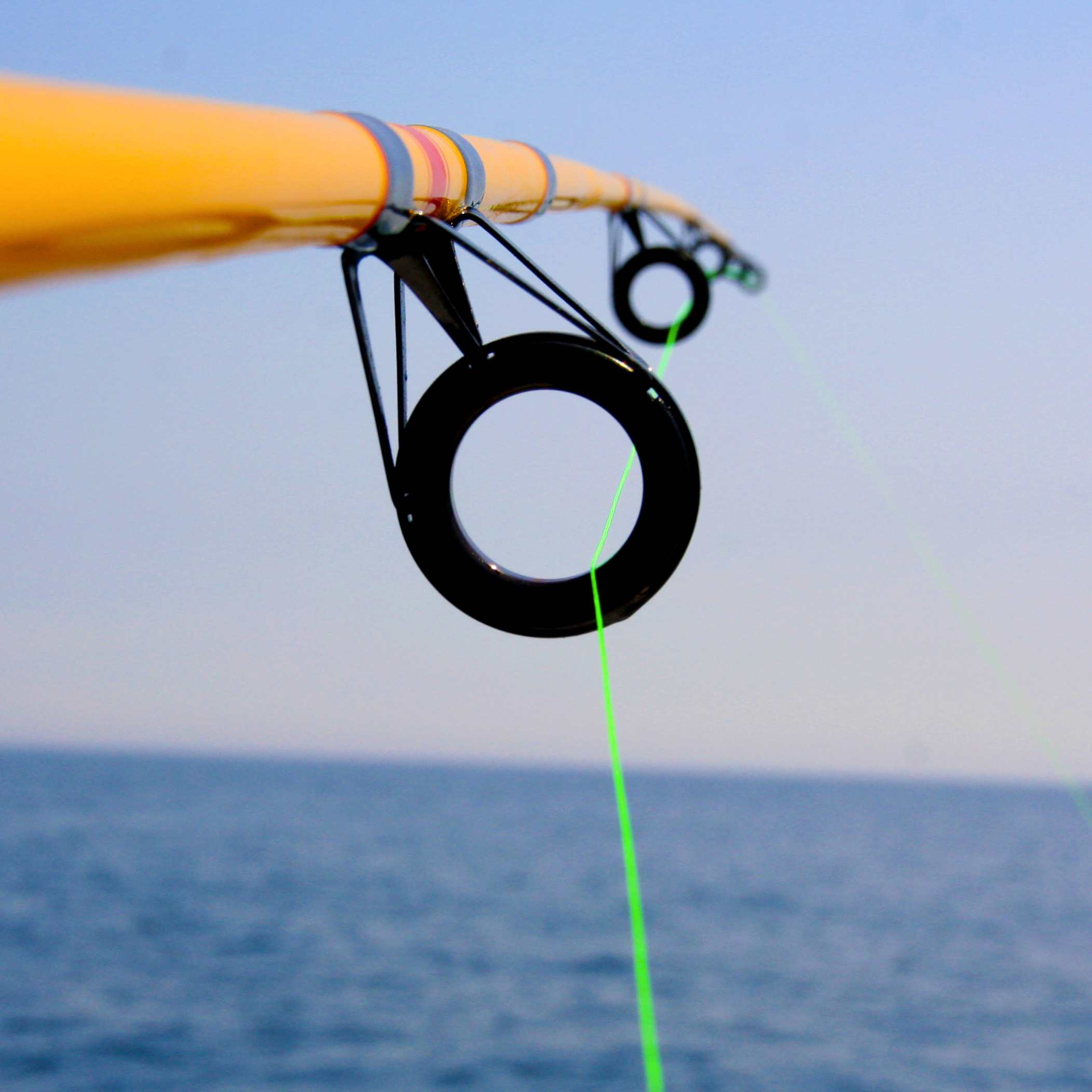
Line guides on modern fishing rods

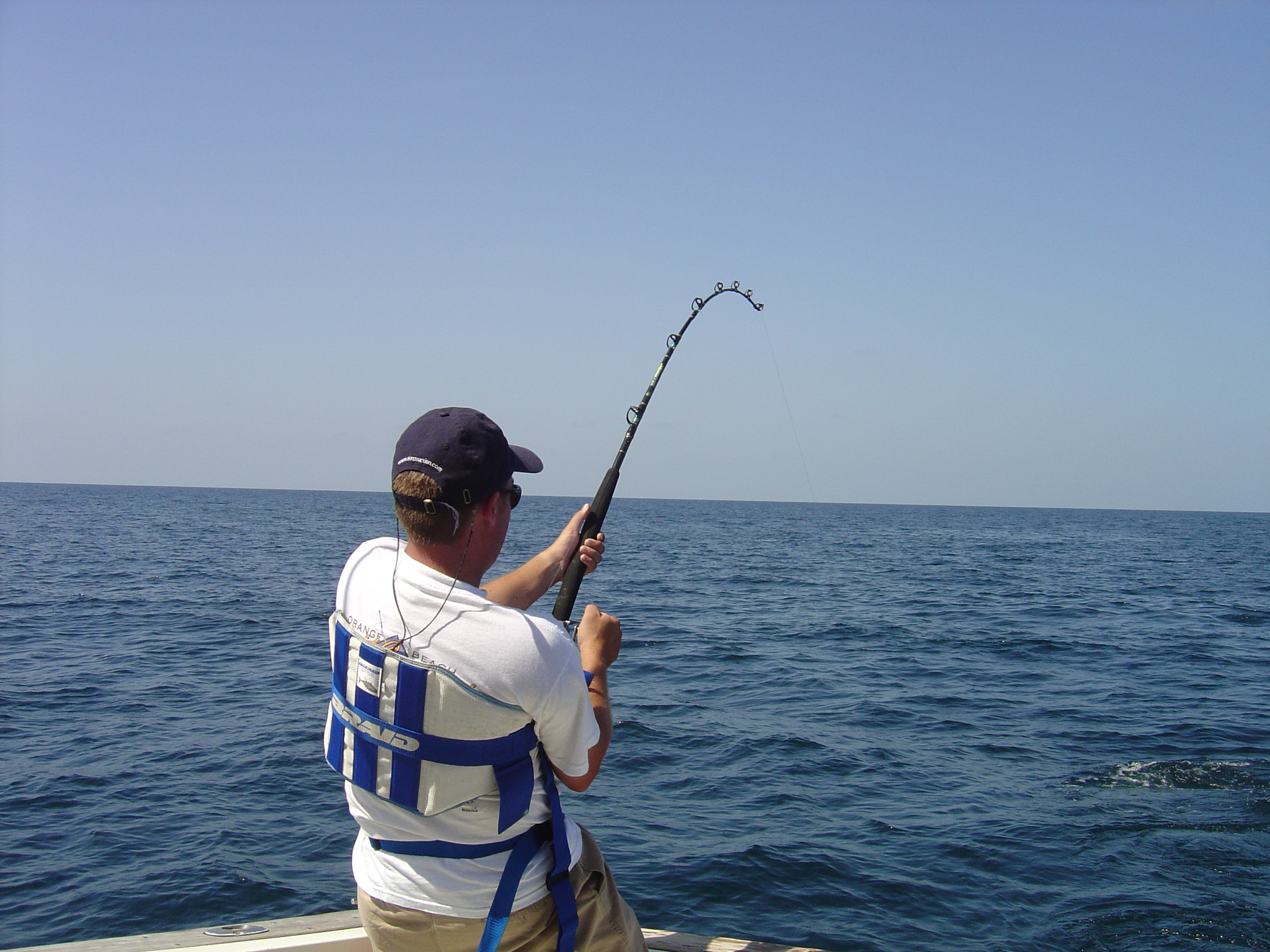
Fishing with a fishing rod

A fishing rod or fishing pole is a long, thin rod used by anglers to catch fish by manipulating a line ending in a hook (formerly known as an angle, hence the term "angling"). At its most basic form, a fishing rod is a straight rigid stick/pole with a line fastened to one end (as seen in traditional bamboo rod fishing such as Tenkara fishing); however, modern rods are usually more elastic and generally have the line stored in a reel mounted at the rod handle, which is hand-cranked and controls the line retrieval, as well as numerous line-restricting rings (also known as line guides) that distribute bending stress along the rod and help dampening down/prevent line whipping and entanglement. To better entice fish, baits or lures are dressed onto the hook attached to the line, and a bite indicator (e.g. a float) is typically used, some of which (e.g. quiver tip) might be incorporated as part of the rod itself.

Functionally, fishing rod acts as an extended cantilever that amplifies line movement, providing the angler with a wider range of motion of line control when luring and pulling the fish. It also enhances casting distance by increasing the launch speed of the terminal tackles (the hook, bait/lure, and other accompanying attachments such as float and sinker/feeder), as a longer swing radius (compared to that of a human arm) corresponds to greater arc speed at the rod tip under the same angular velocity. The length of fishing rods usually vary between 0.6 m (2 ft) and 4.6 m (15 ft) depending on the style of angling, while the Guinness World Record is 22.45 m (73 ft 7.9 in).

Traditional fishing rods are made from a single, monolithic piece of hardwood (such as ash and hickory) or bamboo; while contemporary rods are usually made from alloys (such as aluminium) or more often high-tensile synthetic composites (such as fibreglass or carbon fiber), and may come in multi-piece (joined via ferrules) or telescoping forms that are more portable and storage-friendly. Most fishing rods are tapered towards the tip to reduce the gravitational leverage front of the handle that an angler has to overcome when lifting the rod. Many modern rods are also constructed from hollow blanks to increase the specific strength of the design and reduce the overall weight.

In contrast with fishing nets and traps, which are usually used in subsistence and commercial fishing, angling with rods is a far less efficient method of catching fish, and is used more often in recreational fishing and competitive casting, which focus less on the yield and more on the experience. Fishing rods also come in many sizes, elasticity, stiffness and configurations depending on the sizes of the intended fish, fresh or saltwater applications, or the different angling styles. Fishing rods also vary in construction and design to tailor for specific subtypes of angling, for instance: spin fishing rods (both spinning and baitcasting rods) are optimized for frequent, repeated casting, and are usually lighter and have faster action; fly rods are designed to better sling heavy lines and ultralight artificial flies, and are usually much more flexible and slower in action; surfcasting rods are designed to cast baits or lures out over far distances into the surf zone, and tends to be quite long; ice fishing rods are designed to fish through small drilled holes in ice covered lakes, and usually very short; and trolling rods are designed to drag heavy bait or lures through water while boat fishing, and usually have greater ultimate tensile strength due to the frequently large sizes of the target fish.

== History ==
=== Fly fishing ===
Trading card of the Ustonson company, an early firm specializing in fishing rods, and holder of a Royal Warrant from the 1760s

The art of fly fishing took a great leap forward after the English Civil War, where a newly found interest in the activity left its mark on the many books and treatises that were written on the subject at the time. The renowned officer in the Parliamentary army, Robert Venables, published in 1662 The Experienced Angler, or Angling improved, being a general discourse of angling, imparting many of the aptest ways and choicest experiments for the taking of most sorts of fish in pond or river. Compleat Angler was written by Izaak Walton in 1653 (although Walton continued to add to it for a quarter of a century) and described the fishing in the Derbyshire Wye. It was a celebration of the art and spirit of fishing in prose and verse; six verses were quoted from John Dennys's earlier work. A second part to the book was added by Walton's friend Charles Cotton.

The 18th century was mainly an era of consolidation of the techniques developed in the previous century. Running rings began to appear along the fishing rods, which gave anglers greater control over the cast line. The rods themselves were also becoming increasingly sophisticated and specialized for different roles. Jointed rods became common from the middle of the century and bamboo came to be used for the top section of the rod, giving it a much greater strength and flexibility.

The industry also became commercialized – rods and tackle were sold at the haberdashers store. After the Great Fire of London in 1666, artisans moved to Redditch which became a centre of production of fishing related products from the 1730s. Onesimus Ustonson established his trading shop in 1761, and his establishment remained as a market leader for the next century. He received a Royal Warrant from three successive monarchs starting with King George IV.

=== Technological improvements ===
The impact of the Industrial Revolution was first felt in the manufacture of fly lines. Instead of anglers twisting their own lines, a laborious and time-consuming process, the new textile spinning machines allowed for a variety of tapered lines to be easily manufactured and marketed.

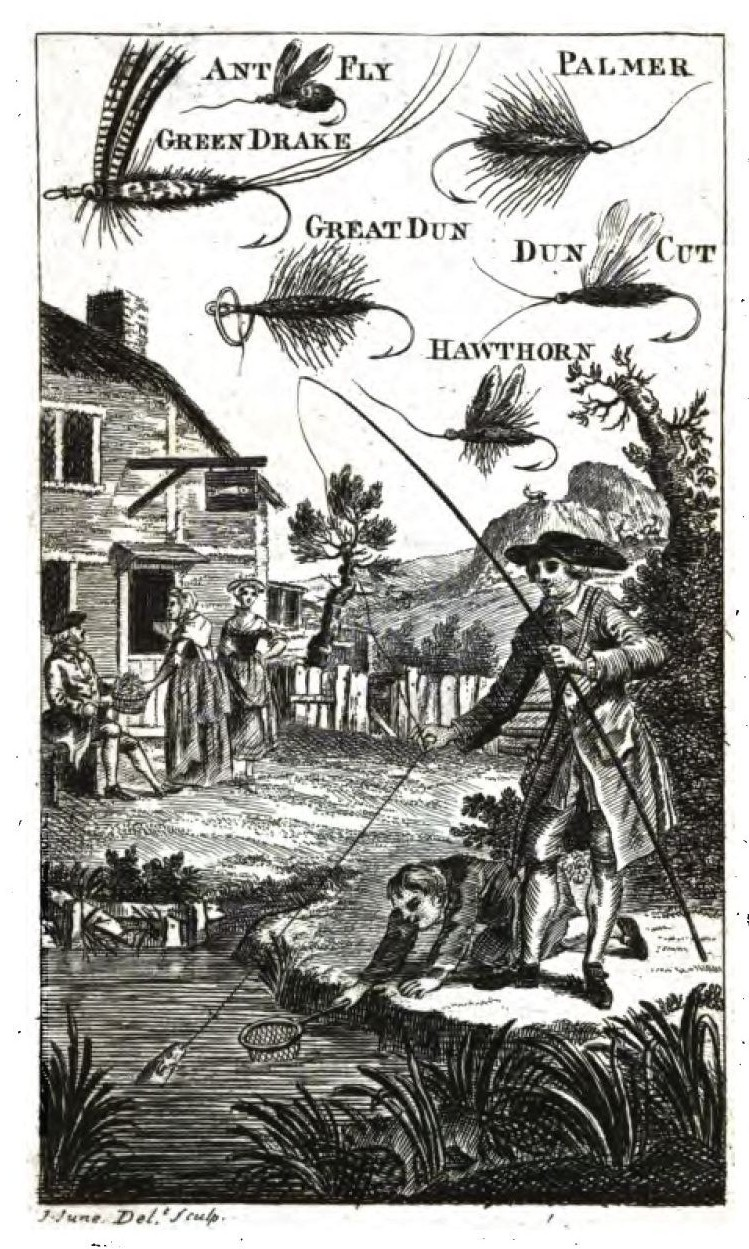
Frontispiece from The Art of Angling by Richard Brookes, 1790

The material used for the rod itself changed from the heavy woods native to England, to lighter and more elastic varieties imported from abroad, especially from South America and the West Indies. Bamboo rods became the generally favored option from the mid 19th century, and several strips of the material were cut from the cane, milled into shape, and then glued together to form light, strong, hexagonal rods with a solid core that were superior to anything that preceded them.

Other materials used, were Tonkin bamboo Calcutta reed, ash wood, hickory, ironwood, maple, lancewood, or malacca cane. These products were light, tough, and pliable. Rods were generally made in three pieces called a butt, midsection, and tip. The butts were frequently made of maple, with bored bottom; this butt outlasted several tops. Midsections were generally made from ironwood because it was a stronger wood. Tips were generally made from bamboo for its elasticity which could throw the bait further and more accurately. Handles and grips were generally of cork, wood, or wrapped cane. Many different types of glue held these sections together, most commonly Irish glue and bone glue. This was until hilton glue, or cement glue, was introduced because of its waterproof qualities. Even today, Tonkin split-bamboo rods are still popular in fly fishing.

Until the mid 19th century, rods were generally made in England. This changed in 1846 when American Samuel Phillippe introduced an imported fishing rod the first six strips of Calcutta cane made in Bavaria where Phillippe was importing Violins that he passed off as his own hand work. Split-cane rods were later independently produced after Phillippe started to sell the imported rods to a New York retailer and then copied by Americans Charles Orvis, Hiram Leonard and Englishman William Hardy in the 1870s and mass production methods made these rods accessible to the public. Horton Manufacturing Company first introduced an all steel rod in 1913. These rods were heavy and flexible and did not satisfy many customers. The next big occurrence in fishing rods was the introduction of the fiberglass rod in the 1940s and was developed by Robert Gayle and a Mr. Mcguire.

Boron and Graphite rods came around in the 1960s and 1970s when the United States and United Kingdom invested considerable research into developing the new technologies. Hewitt and Howald were the first to come up with a way to lay the fibers into the shape of a fishing rod by wrapping them around a piece of balsa wood. However, by 1977, boron fibre technology had been muscled out by the cheaper material graphite and was no longer competitive in the market.

Rods for travelers were made with nickel-silver metal joints, or ferrules, that could be inserted into one another forming the rod. Some of them were made to be used as a walking cane until needed for sport. Since the 1980s, with the advent of flexible, yet stiff graphite ferrules, travel rod technology has greatly advanced, and multi-piece travel rods that can be transported in a suitcase or backpack constitute a large share of the market.

== Modern design ==
In theory, an ideal rod should gradually taper from butt to tip, be tight in all its joints (if any), and have a smooth, progressive taper without 'dead spots'. Modern design and fabrication techniques, along with advanced materials such as graphite, boron, magnesium alloy and fiberglass composites, as well as stainless steel (see Emmrod), have allowed rod makers to tailor the shape and action of fishing rods for casting distance, accuracy, and fish-fighting qualities. Fishing rods are commonly identified by their weight (the weight of line or lure required to flex a fully loaded rod) and action (the speed with which the rod returns to its neutral position).

Generally, three types of rods are widely used: graphite, fiberglass, and bamboo. Bamboo rods are typically the heaviest of the three, but they remain in use for their feel. Fiberglass rods are generally heavier than graphite rods and are often used by anglers seeking lower-cost equipment or greater durability, particularly in rugged settings such as rocks or piers where rods may be knocked against hard surfaces. Graphite rods are lighter and tend to be more sensitive, allowing the user to detect bites more easily.

Modern fishing rods retain cork as a common material for grips. Cork is light, durable, and retains warmth. EVA foam and carbon fiber grips are also used. Reel seats are often made of graphite-reinforced plastic, aluminium, or wood. Guides are available in steel and titanium, with a wide variety of ceramic and metal alloy inserts replacing the agate inserts used on earlier rods.

Back- or butt-rests can also be used with modern fishing rods to make it easier to fight large game fish. These are fork-like supports that help keep the rod in position, providing leverage and counteracting tension caused by a hooked fish.

== Rod making bench ==
An old rod-making bench would generally consist of a 6-to-8-foot (2 to 2.5 m) bench, vice, a drawing knife, a jack, a fore plane, large coarse flat file, sand paper, and several strips of wood about 2 feet (60 cm) long with different size grooves in them. Newer rod building benches are smaller versions of lathes powered by small motors that turn the rod as thread is applied to secure the guides. The motor is controlled by a foot operated rheostat, similar to that found on a sewing machine. A low rpm motor can be used to apply rod finish, typically a two-part resin, to protect the threads.

== Specifications ==
There are several specifications manufacturers use to delineate rod uses. These include power, action, line weight, lure weight, and number of pieces.

=== Power value ===
Also known as "rod weight", the power value of a fishing rod implies its stiffness by vaguely describing the force needed to produce a certain degree of flexure upon the rod, and may be classified as ultra-light (UL), light (L), medium-light (ML), medium (M), medium-heavy (MH), heavy (H), extra-heavy (XH), or other similar combinations. It is often an indicator of what styles of fishing, species of target fish, or size of fish a particular rod may be best suited for. The heavier the power of a rod, the more weight it can lift up easily without snapping. However, stiffer rods are also less sensitive, as light forces (such as vibrations from fish touching the hook) do not transmit well through a stiffer rod, but the bites from larger fish to heavy lures tend not to be hard to detect. Ultra-light rods are suitable for catching baitfish and small panfish, for situations where rod responsiveness is critical, or for casting very light tackles. Heavy/extra-heavy rods are used in deep-sea fishing, surf fishing, or big-game boat fishing.

While manufacturers use various designations for a rod's power value, there is no consensus or industrial standard, hence application of a particular weight tag a manufacturer is somewhat subjective. Any fish can theoretically be caught with any rod, but catching panfish on a heavy rod offers no sport whatsoever, and successfully landing a large fish on an ultralight rod requires supreme rod handling skills but more frequently still ends in broken tackles and a lost fish. It is generally advised to "pick the right tool for the job" and choose rod weights that are best suited to the intended type of fishing.

=== Action ===
The action of a fishing rod refers to the speed with which it elastically returns to the neutral (straightened) position after a flexional load is removed (i.e. the "recoil" or "rebound" speed), and is generally described as being "slow", "medium", "fast", or anything in between (e.g. "medium-fast") or beyond (e.g. "extra-fast"). Contrary to how it is often colloquially described, action does not refer to the bending characteristics (shape of the "curve") of the rod — a fast-action rod can as easily have a more evenly progressive bending curve (from tip to butt) as opposed to a more tip-bending curve, although tip-bending rods do inherently tend to have faster action. The action can also be influenced by the length of a rod, the tapering profile, and the blank materials used. Typically a rod that uses a fiberglass composite blank has slower action than one that uses a carbon fiber composite blank.

Action, however, is also often a subjective description of a manufacturer. Very often action is misused to note the bending curve instead of the speed. Some manufacturers list the power value of the rod as its action. A "medium" action bamboo rod may have a faster action than a "fast" fibreglass rod. Action is also subjectively used by anglers, as an angler might compare a given rod as "faster" or "slower" than a different rod.

A rod's action and power may change when load is greater or lesser than the rod's specified casting weight. When the load used greatly exceeds a rod's specifications a rod may break during casting, if the line does not break first. When the load is significantly less than the rod's recommended range the casting distance is significantly reduced, as the rod's action cannot launch the load. It acts like a stiff pole. In fly rods, exceeding weight ratings may warp the blank or have casting difficulties when rods are improperly loaded.

Rods with a fast action combined with a full progressive bending curve allows the fisherman to make longer casts, given that the cast weight and line diameter is correct. When a cast weight exceeds the specifications lightly, a rod becomes slower, slightly reducing the distance. When a cast weight is slightly less than the specified casting weight the distance is slightly reduced as well, as the rod action is only used partially.

=== Rod sensitivity ===
A rod's blank determines the level of sensitivity anglers feel. For example, fishing rods made of graphite are most sensitive due their greater efficiency in transfer of vibrations than counterparts made of materials such as fiberglass. The rod blank is not solely responsible for the translation of sensitivity. A rod's design impacts how well an angler 'feels' a fish's bite or the bottom of the water body they are fishing in. Essentially, the more sensitivity a rod has, the more probable it is to feel a bite and thus achieve a successful hookset to land the fish.

=== Bending curvature and tapering ===
A fishing rod's main function is to bend and deliver a certain resistance or power. While casting, the rod acts as a catapult: by moving the rod shaft forward, the inertia of the mass of the terminal tackles and the distal portion of rod itself will load (bend) the rod tip backwards, and the subsequent forward elastic rebound will sling out the lure/bait. When a hook bite is registered and the fisherman jerks the rod, the bending of the rod will realign the pull along the line and help setting the hook properly. When fighting a fish, the elasticity of the rod not only enables the fisherman to keep the line under tension, but also dampens the shock of the fish struggling and avoid line snapping, which helps to exhaust the fish and enable the fisherman to reel it in. The rod bending also lessens the torque the fisherman has to overcome when fighting the fish by shortening the practical leverage the line is pulling on the rod, as stiffer rods have more distance between the tip and the handle even when bent, which actually translates to less effective force being transmitted due to more mechanical advantage in favor of the fish. In comparison, a deeper bending rod will demand less power from the fisherman, but deliver more fighting power to the fish. In practice, this leverage effect often misleads fisherman. Often it is believed that a hard, stiff rod puts more control and power on the fish to fight, while it is actually the fish who is putting the power on the fisherman. In commercial fishing practice, large fish are often pulled in on the line itself without much effort, which is possible because the absence of the leverage effect.

A rod can bend in different curves. Traditionally the bending curve is mainly determined by its tapering. In simplified terms, a fast taper will bend a lot more in the tip area and not much in the butt part, and a slow taper will tend to bend too much at the butt and delivers a weak rod. A progressive tapering which loads smooth from top to butt, adding in power the deeper the rod is bent. In practice, the tapers of quality rods often are curved or in steps to achieve the right action and bending curve for the type of fishing a rod is built. In today's practice, different fibres with different properties can be used in a single rod. In this practice, there is no straight relationship anymore between the actual tapering and the bending curve.

The bending curve is not easily described by terms. However, some rod and blank manufacturers try to simplify things towards their customers by describing the bending curve by associating them with their action. The term fast action is used for rods where only the tip is bending, and slow action for rods bending from tip to butt. In practice, this is misleading, as top-quality rods are very often fast-action rods, bending from tip to butt. While the so-called "fast-action" rods are stiff rods (with absence of any action) which end in a soft or slow tip section. The construction of a progressive bending, fast action rod is more difficult and more expensive to achieve. Common terms to describe the bending curve or properties which influence the bending curve are: progressive taper/loading/curve/bending/..., fast taper, heavy progressive (notes a bending curve close to progressive, tending to become fast-tapered), tip action (also referred to as "umbrella"-action), broom-action (which refers to the previously mentioned stiff "fast action"-rods with soft tip). A parabolic action is often used to note a progressive bending curve, in fact this term comes from a series of splitcane fly rods built by Pezon & Michel in France since the late 1930s, which had a progressive bending curve. Sometimes the term parabolic is more specific used to note the specific type of progressive bending curve as was found in the Parabolic series.

A common way today to describe a rod's bending properties is the Common Cents System, which is "a system of objective and relative measurement for quantifying rod power, action and even this elusive thing ... fishermen like to call feel."

The bending curve determines the way a rod builds up and releases its power. This influences not only the casting and the fish-fighting properties, but also the sensitivity to strikes when fishing lures, the ability to set a hook (which is also related to the mass of the rod), the control over the lure or bait, the way the rod should be handled and how the power is distributed over the rod. On a full progressive rod, the power is distributed most evenly over the whole rod.

=== Line weight ===
The line weight of a fishing rod describes the optimal tension along the fishing line the rod is designed to handle, usually expressed in pounds or kilograms. A fishing line's "breaking weight" describes the maximum tensile force that can be exerted before the line breaks apart, while the line weight for a rod describes as the extent of bending force that the rod can support. Fly rod weights are typically expressed as a number from 1 to 12 written as "N"wt (e.g. 6wt), and each weight represents a standard weight in grains for the first 30 ft (9 m) of the fly line, established by the American Fishing Tackle Manufacturing Association. For example, the first 30 in (75 cm) of a 6wt fly line should weigh between 152–168 grains (10–11 grams), with the optimal weight being 160 grains (10 grams). In casting and spinning rods, designations such as "8-15 lb line weight" are typical.

=== Lure weight ===
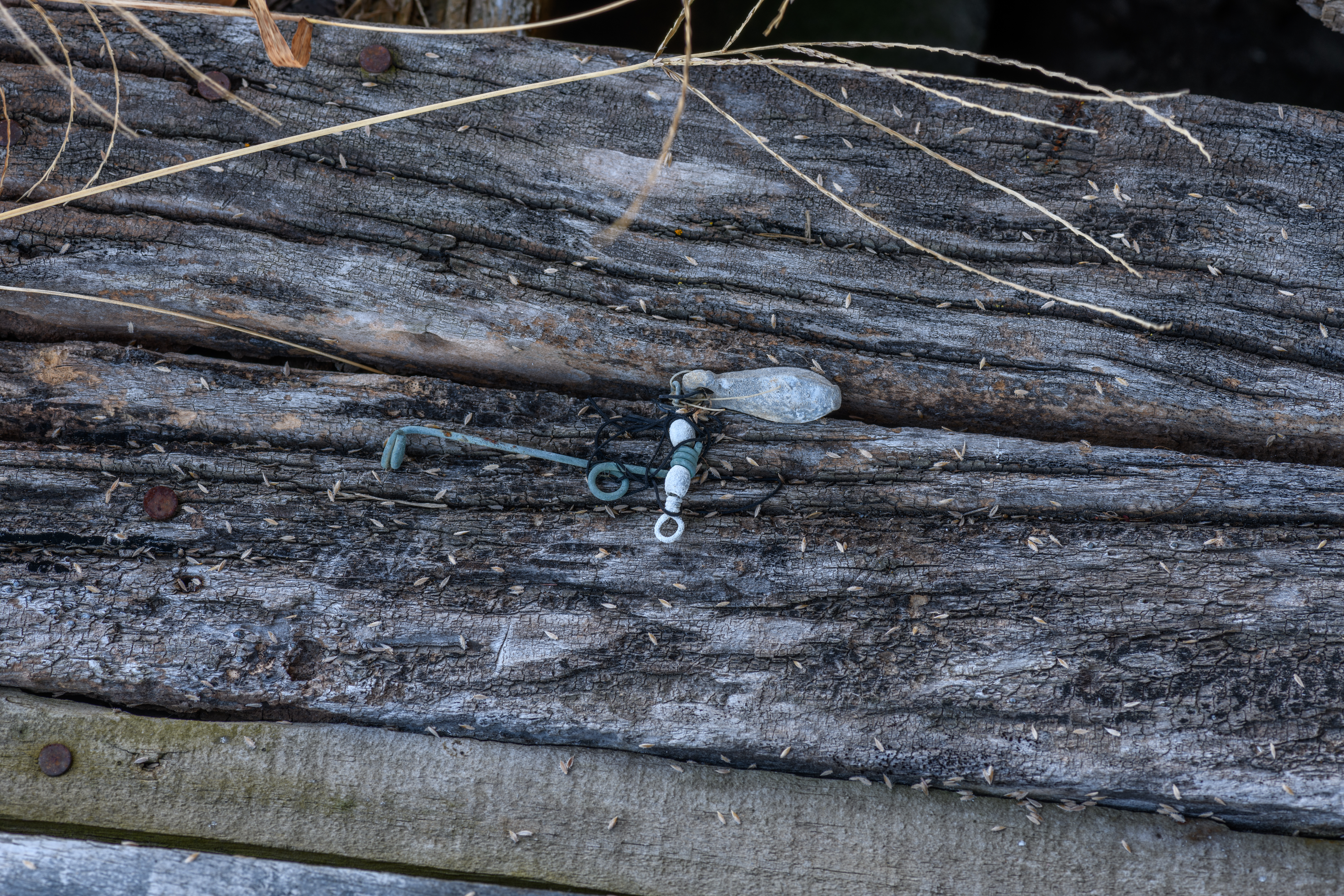
fishing tackle

The lure weight of a fishing rod describes the optimal weight range of terminal tackle (mainly the bait and hook/lure, and any attached float, sinker, swivel and/or heavy leader), usually expressed in ounces or grams, that the rod is designed to handle in order to achieve good casting outcome. Casting lures heavier than the designated weights might result in the rod tip breaking, while lures that are too light might have trouble with casting distance and accuracy.

=== Number of sections ===
Rods that are one piece from butt to tip are considered to have the most natural "feel" due to the theoretically uninterrupted transfer of vibrations to the angler's hand, and are preferred by many. However, the difficulty in transporting one-piece rod safely becomes an increasing problem with increasing rod length. Two-piece rods, joined by a ferrule, are very common, and if well engineered (especially with tubular glass or carbon fibre rods), sacrifice very little in the way of natural feel. Some fishermen do feel a difference in sensitivity with two-piece rods, but most do not.

Some rods are joined through a metal "bus". These add mass to the rod which helps in setting the hook and help activating the rod from tip to butt when casting, resulting in a better casting experience. Some anglers experience this kind of fitting as superior to a one piece rod. They are found on specialized hand-built rods. Apart from adding the correct mass, depending on the kind of rod, this fitting also is the strongest known fitting, but also the most expensive one. For that reason they are almost never to be found on commercial fishing rods.

== Types ==
A fibreglass spinning rod and reel circa 1997

Fishing rods can be constructed out of a vast number of materials. Generally they are made with either fiberglass, graphite, or a new generation composite, also known as carbon fibre. Many times carbon fibre and graphite are used together in the rod making process.

=== Carbon fibre rods ===
A carbon fibre rod is not necessarily better than a glass fibre rod; the two fibres have different properties, with their own tradeoffs. Carbon fibre is less flexible (stiffer) than glass fibre and more brittle and prone to breakage when misused, while carbon fibre allows for longer and faster rods. Carbon fibre also allows for a smaller diameter rod that is more sensitive than a glass fibre rod. A carbon fibre rod is also much lighter than a glass fibre rod allowing for longer days of fishing. Each has its purpose in the fishing industry and both improve an anglers chances of being successful when the blanks are used for the right purposes.

=== Fly rods ===
Fly rods are thin, flexible fishing rods designed to cast an artificial fly, usually consisting of a hook tied with fur, feathers, foam, or other lightweight material. More modern flies are also tied with synthetic materials. Originally made of yew, green heart, and later split bamboo (Tonkin cane), most modern fly rods are constructed from man-made composite materials, including fibreglass, carbon/graphite, or graphite/boron composites. Split bamboo rods are generally considered the most beautiful, the most "classic", and are also generally the most fragile of the styles, and they require a great deal of care to last well. Instead of a weighted lure, a fly rod uses the weight of the fly line for casting, and lightweight rods are capable of casting the very smallest and lightest fly. Typically, a monofilament segment called a "leader" is tied to the fly line on one end and the fly on the other.

Each rod is sized to the fish being sought, the wind and water conditions and also to a particular weight of line: larger and heavier line sizes will cast heavier, larger flies. Fly rods come in a wide variety of line sizes, from size #000 to #0 rods for the smallest freshwater trout and pan fish up to and including #16 rods for large saltwater game fish. Fly rods tend to have a single, large-diameter line guide (called a stripping guide), with a number of smaller looped guides (aka snake guides) spaced along the rod to help control the movement of the relatively thick fly line. To prevent interference with casting movements, most fly rods usually have little or no butt section (handle) extending below the fishing reel. However, the Spey rod, a fly rod with an elongated rear handle, is often used for fishing either large rivers for salmon and Steelhead or saltwater surf casting, using a two-handed casting technique.

Fly rods are, in modern manufacture, almost always built out of carbon graphite. The graphite fibres are laid down in increasingly sophisticated patterns to keep the rod from flattening when stressed (usually referred to as hoop strength). The rod tapers from one end to the other and the degree of taper determines how much of the rod flexes when stressed. The larger amount of the rod that flexes the "slower" the rod. Slower rods are easier to cast, create lighter presentations but create a wider loop on the forward cast that reduces casting distance and is subject to the effects of wind. Furthermore, the process of wrapping graphite fibre sheets to build a rod creates imperfections that result in rod twist during casting. Rod twist is minimized by orienting the rod guides along the side of the rod with the most "give". This is done by flexing the rod and feeling for the point of most give or by using computerized rod testing.

Custom rod building is an active hobby among fly fishermen. See Fly rod building.

=== Tenkara rods ===
Tenkara rods are a type of bamboo fly rod used for tenkara fishing in Japan. A mixture of the rods in the other categories, they are carbon rods, fly rods and telescopic rods all in one. These are ultra-light and very portable telescopic rods (read more about telescopic below). Their extended length normally ranges from 11 to 13 feet (3.5 to 4 m), and they have a very soft action. The action of tenkara rods has been standardized as a ratio of "how many parts are stiffer : how many tip parts bend more easily". The standard actions are 5:5, 6:4, 7:3, and 8:2, with 5:5 being a softer/slower rod, and 8:2 being a stiffer rod. Similar to western fly-rods tenkara rods also have cork, and sometimes even wooden handles, with wooden handles (such as red-pine, and phoenix-tree wood) being the more prized rods due to their increased sensitivity to fish bites and the heavier feel that helps balance the rods. Tenkara rods have no guides. Tenkara is a fixed-line fishing method, where no reel is used, but rather the line is tied directly to the tip of the rod. Like the carbon rods mentioned above this allows for "very precise positioning of the fly which in turn enables huge catches of fish with accurate feeding". One of the most common flies used in tenkara fishing is the Sakasa Kebari. Tenkara fishing is very popular in Japan, where these rods can be found in every major tackle shop. In the US, tenkara is beginning to grow in popularity.

=== Spin casting rods ===
Spin casting rods are rods designed to hold a spin casting reel, which are normally mounted above the handle. Spin casting rods also have small eyes and, frequently, a forefinger grip trigger. They are very similar to bait casting rods, to the point where either type of reel may be used on a particular rod. While rods were at one time offered as specific "spin casting" or "bait casting" rods, this has become uncommon, as the rod design is suited to either fishing style. Today they are simply called "casting rods", and are usually offered with no distinction as to which style they are best suited for in use.

=== Baitcasting rods ===
While the easy to use spin casting rods are often used by novice anglers, baitcasting rods and reels are generally more difficult to use. Professional anglers, however, prefer baitcasting rod and reel combos because baitcasting reels grant anglers more accuracy in their casts. Casting rods are typically viewed as somewhat more powerful than their spinning rod counterparts – they can use heavier line and can handle heavier cover. Baitcasting rods low profile design along with a super silent high-speed 7.0:1-line retrieve.

=== Spinning rods ===
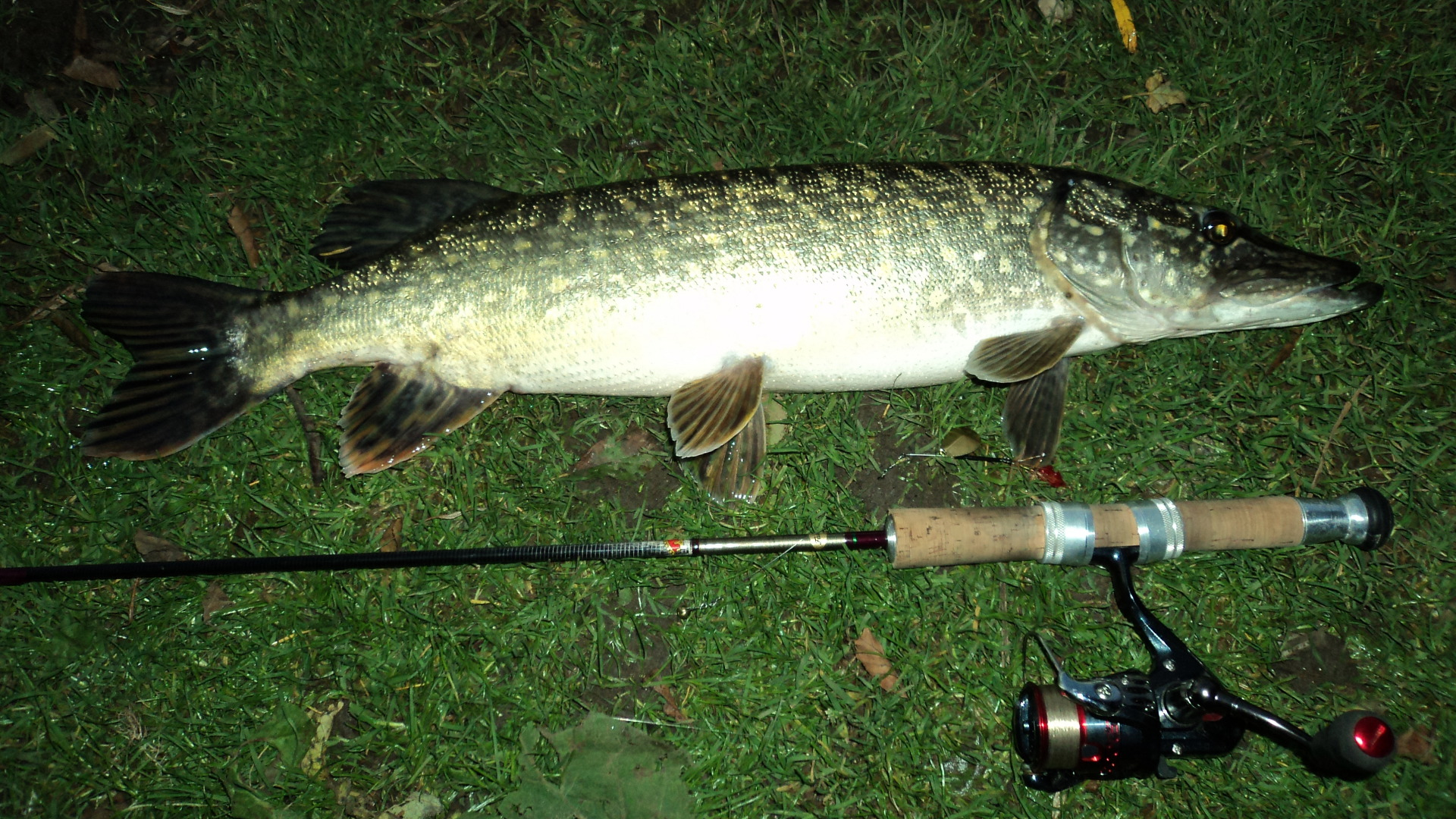
26.4-inch-long (65 cm) pike caught on an ultra-light spinning rod (5-gram or 75-grain casting weight) using a 1-inch (25 mm) spinner bait

Spinning rods are made from graphite or fiberglass with a cork or PVC foam handle, and tend to be between 5 and 8.5 feet (1.5 and 2.5 m) in length. Typically, spinning rods have anywhere from 5–8 guides arranged along the underside of the rod to help control the line. The eyes decrease in size from the handle to the tip, with the one nearest the handle usually much larger than the rest to allow less friction as the coiled line comes off the reel, and to gather the very large loops of line that come off the spinning reel's spool. Unlike bait casting and spin casting reels, the spinning reel hangs beneath the rod rather than sitting on top, and is held in place with a sliding or locking reel seat. The fisherman's second and third fingers straddle the "leg" of the reel where it is attached to the reel seat on the rod, and the weight of the reel hangs beneath the rod, which makes for a more comfortable way to fish for extended periods. This also allows the rod to be held in the fisherman's dominant hand (the handle on most modern spinning reels is reversible) which greatly increases control and nuance applied to the rod itself. Spinning rods and reels are widely used in fishing for popular North American sport fish including bass, trout, pike and walleye. Popular targets for spinning in the UK and European continent are pike, perch, eel and zander (walleye). Longer spinning rods with elongated grip handles for two-handed casting are frequently employed for saltwater or steelhead and salmon fishing. Spinning rods are also widely used for trolling and still fishing with live bait.

=== Ultra-light rods ===
These rods are used to fish for smaller species, they provide more sport with larger fish, or to enable fishing with lighter line and smaller lures. Though the term is commonly used to refer to spinning or spin-cast rods and tackle, fly rods in smaller line weights (size #0–#3) have also long been utilized for ultra-light fishing, as well as to protect the thin-diameter, lightweight end section of leader, or tippet, used in this type of angling.

Ultra-light spinning and casting rods are generally shorter (4 to 8 feet or 1.2 to 2.4 meters is common) lighter, and more limber than normal rods. Tip actions vary from slow to fast, depending upon intended use. These rods usually carry 1 to 6 pounds-force (0.5 to 2.5 kgf; 4.5 to 26.5 N) test fishing line. Some ultra-light rods are capable of casting lures as light as 1/64 of an ounce (0.44 grams) – typically small spinners, wet flies, crappie jigs, tubes, or bait such as trout worms. Originally produced to bring more excitement to the sport, ultra-light spin fishing is now widely used for crappie, trout, bass, bluegill, roach, perch, bream, pumpkin-seed, tench and other types of pan fish.

=== Ice rods ===
Modern ice rods are typically very short spinning rods, varying between 24 and 36 inches (61 and 91 cm) in length. Classic ice rods – still widely used – are simply stiff rod-like pieces of wood, usually with a carved wooden handle, a couple of line guides, and two opposing hooks mounted ahead of the handle to hand-wind the line around. Ice rods are used to fish through holes in the cover ice of frozen lakes and ponds.

=== Sea rods ===
Sea rods are designed for use with fish from the ocean. They are long, (around 13 feet or 4 meters on average), extremely thick, and feature huge and heavy tips, eyes, and handles. The largest of sea rods are for use with sport fishing boats. Some of these are specialized rods, including shark rods, and marlin rods, and are for use with very heavy equipment.

=== Surf rods ===
The most common type of sea rods are for surf casting. Surf casting rods resemble oversized spinning or bait casting rods with long grip handles intended for two-handed casting techniques. Generally between 10 and 14 feet (3 and 4 m) in length, surf casting rods need to be longer in order for the user cast the lure or bait beyond the breaking surf where fish tend to congregate, and sturdy enough to cast heavy weighted lures or bait needed to hold the bottom in rough water. They are almost always used in shore fishing (sea fishing from the shoreline) from the beach, rocks or other shore feature. Some surfcasters use powerful rods to cast up to six ounces (170 grams) or more of lead weight, artificial lures, and/or bait over one hundred yards (90 m).

=== Trolling rods ===
Trolling is a fishing method of casting the lure or bait to the side of, or behind, a moving boat, and letting the motion of the boat pull the bait through the water. In theory, for light and medium freshwater gamefishing, any casting or spinning rod (with the possible exception of ultralight rods) can be used for trolling. In the last 30 years, most manufacturers have developed a complete line of generally long, heavily built rods sold as "Trolling Rods", and aimed generally at ocean anglers and Great Lakes salmon and steelhead fishermen. A rod effective for trolling should have relatively fast action, as a very "whippy" slow action rod is extremely frustrating to troll with, and a fast action (fairly stiff) rod is generally much easier to work with when fishing by this method. Perhaps the extreme in this philosophy was reached during the 1940s and early 1950s, when the now-defunct True Temper corporation – a maker of garden tools – marketed a line of trolling rods of 4.5-to-5-foot (1.4 to 1.5 m) length made of tempered steel which were square in cross section. They acted as excellent trolling rods, though the action was much too stiff for sportsmanlike playing of fish once hooked. As Great Lakes sportfishing in particular becomes more popular with each passing year, all rod manufacturers continue to expand their lines of dedicated "trolling" rods, though as noted, for most inland lake and stream fishing, a good casting or spinning rod is perfectly adequate for trolling.

=== Telescopic rods ===
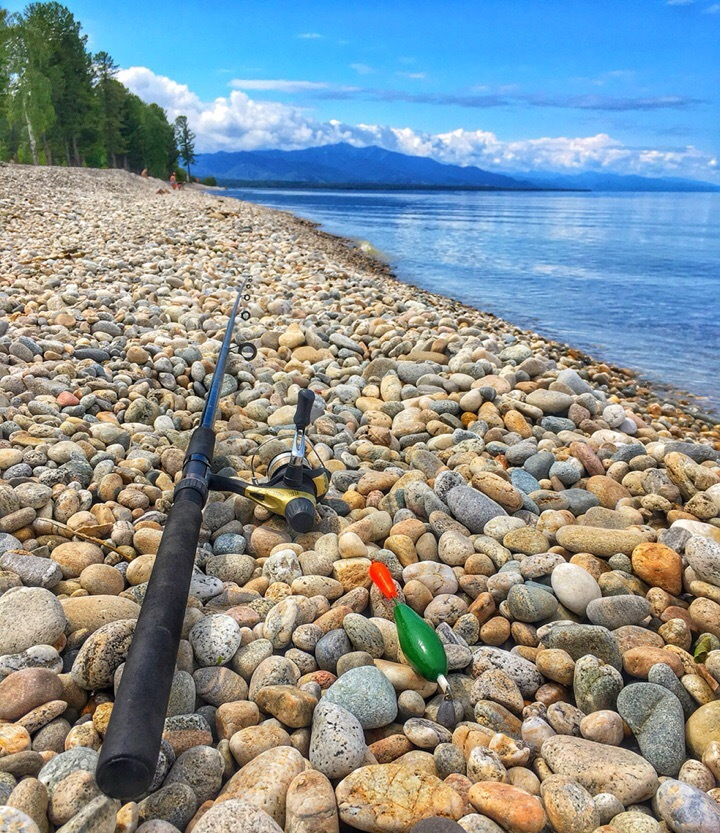
Telescopic rod. Lake Baikal. Eastern Siberia

Telescopic fishing rods are designed to collapse down to a short length and open to a long rod. 20-or-30-foot (6 or 9 m) rods can close to as little as one and a half feet (45 cm). This makes the rods very easy to transport to remote areas or travel on buses, compact cars, and subways. Telescopic fishing rods are made from the same materials as conventional multi-piece rods. Graphite, carbon, and sometimes fibreglass, or composites of these materials, are designed to slip into each other so that they open and close. The eyes on the spinning rods are generally, but not always, a special design to aid in making the end of each section stronger. Various grade eyes available in conventional rods are also available in telescopic fishing rods. The eyeless Tenkara style rods are also of this type and are typically made from carbon and/or graphite.

Care for telescopic fishing rods is much the same as other rods. The only difference being that one should not open the telescopic rod in manner that whips a closed rod into the open position rapidly. Whipping or flinging a telescopic fishing rod open may and likely will cause it to be difficult to close. When closing the rods make a slight twisting motion while pushing the sections together. Often the rods come with tip covers to protect the tip and guides. Additionally, extra care must be taken not to get dirt or sand in the joints; due to their design this can easily damage this style of rod.

Telescopic rods are popular among surf fishermen. Carrying around a 12-or-14-foot (3.5 or 4.5 m) surf fishing rod, even in two pieces, is cumbersome. The shorter the sections the shorter they close, the more eyes they have, and the better the power curve is in them. More eyes means better weight and stress distribution throughout the parabolic arc. This translates to further casting, stronger fish fighting abilities, and less breaking of the rod.

== See also ==
- Composite materials
- Fishing reel
