= Whiting (fish) =

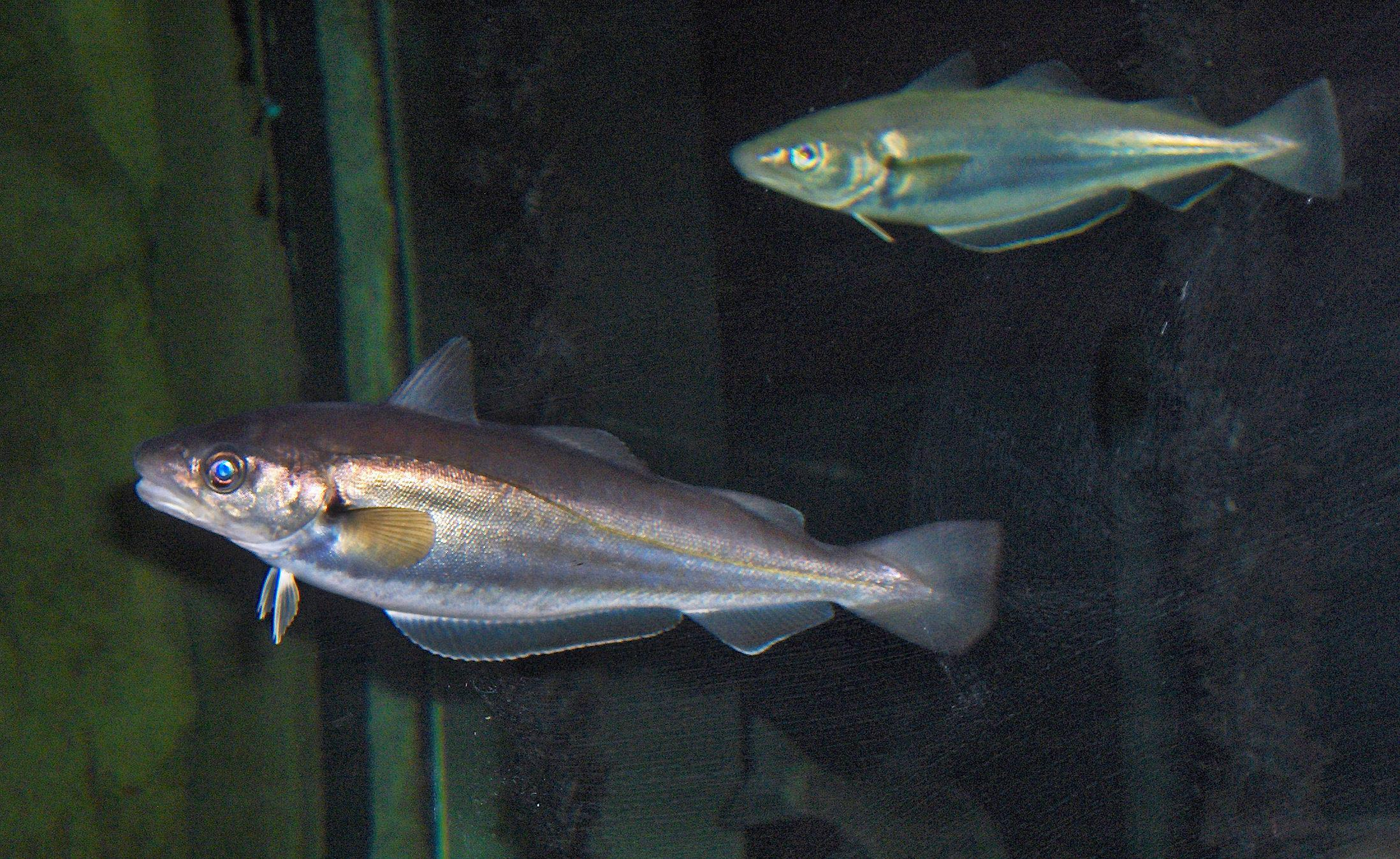
Merlangius merlangus

A number of Actinopterygiian fish have been given the common name whiting.

== Gadiformes (cod-like) ==
- The fish originally known by the name "whiting" in English is Merlangius merlangus, in the family Gadidae. This species inhabits the eastern Atlantic Ocean and the Mediterranean Sea, as well as the North Sea on the East Coast of Britain. In the United States, it is commonly known as the English whiting.
- In Canada, it is used for the Alaska pollock, Gadus chalcogrammus (synonym Theragra chalcogramma).
- In the Southern Ocean, it is used for the southern blue whiting.
- In the US, the name whiting on its own is often used for various species of hake in the genus Merluccius.

== Sciaenidae ==
- The croaker Menticirrhus americanus (also known as the Carolina whiting, king whiting, sea mullet, southern kingcroaker, and southern kingfish) found along the Atlantic and Gulf Coasts of the United States.

== Smelt-whitings ==
- In the Indo-Pacific, the name whiting is used for fish in the family Sillaginidae, such as Japanese whiting, King George whiting, northern whiting, sand whiting, and eastern school whiting.
