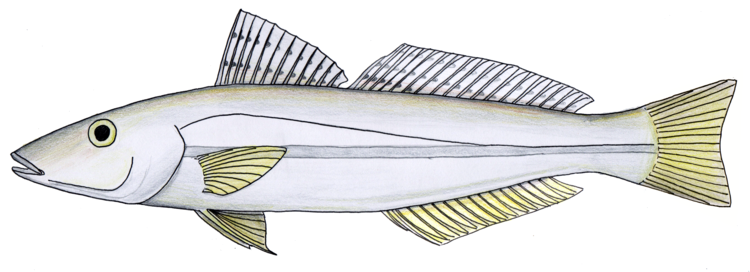

Scientific classification
- Kingdom: Animalia
- Phylum: Chordata
- Class: Actinopterygii
- Order: Acanthuriformes
- Family: Sillaginidae
- Genus: Sillago
- Species: S. schomburgkii

Binomial name
- Sillago schomburgkii Peters, 1864
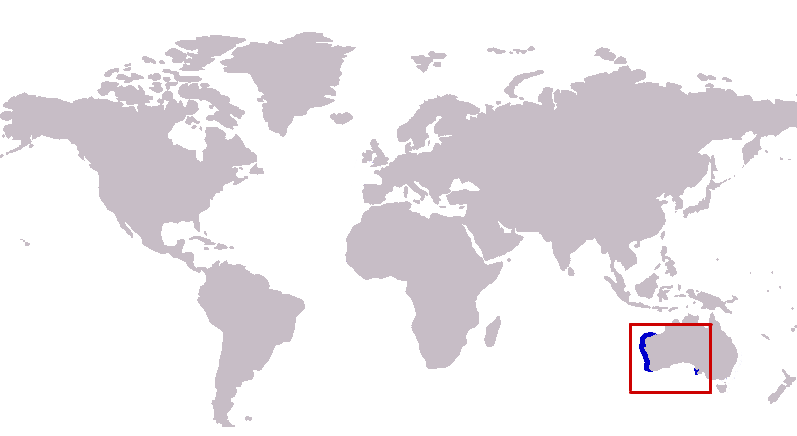
- Range of the yellowfin whiting

Synonyms
- Sillago bostockii Castelnau, 1873; Sillago fraseri Whitley, 1944

= Yellowfin whiting =

Species of fish

The yellowfin whiting (Sillago schomburgkii), also known as the western sand whiting or fine-scaled whiting, is a species of inshore marine fish in the smelt-whiting family Sillaginidae. The species is endemic to the eastern Indian Ocean, ranging from Dampier, Western Australia to Gulf St Vincent in South Australia, with an apparent division in the populations of the two states. Yellowfin whiting inhabit relatively shallow waters for their entire life, often found on tidal flats and creeks, as well as large estuaries. It is one of the largest members of the smelt-whiting family, growing to 42 cm, and can be distinguished by a number of anatomical and colour related features. Yellowfin whiting are benthic carnivores, preying predominantly on polychaete worms, with minor amounts of copepods, amphipods and bivalves also commonly taken. The species shows a change in diet with age, and also dietary differences with other sillaginids presumably to minimize competition. Reproduction occurs at different times throughout its range, generally focused around summer, with up to 217,000 eggs produced per season. Yellowfin whiting reach sexual maturity at around 20 cm, with each individual spawning more than once. The species forms the basis of major fisheries in both Shark Bay, Western Australia and the two Gulfs of South Australia, with around 260 tonnes of fish taken each year. They are also a popular target for shore based anglers, with a reputation as a very good table fish.

== Taxonomy and naming ==
The yellowfin whiting is one of over 30 species in the genus Sillago, which is one of five genera belonging to the smelt whiting family Sillaginidae, this family was previously considered to be part of the Percoidea, a suborder of the Perciformes. The 5th edition of Fishes of the World classifies the Sillaginidae in the order Spariformes.

The species was first recognised and scientifically described by the German naturalist Wilhelm Peters in 1864 based on the holotype collected from the waters near Adelaide, the capital city of South Australia. Peters assigned the species name schomburgkii in honor of the German explorer and botanist Moritz Richard Schomburgk, who became the second Director of the Adelaide Botanic Gardens. Schomburgk collected the specimen and sent it to Peters, who was by then the curator of the Berlin Zoological Museum (in the present day the Berlin's Natural History Museum), an institution for which Schomburgk had collected extensively before in the past during expeditions to British Guiana. Prior to Peter's description, the yellowfin whiting was at first confused with the similar Sillago bassensis, which also occurs within the same range. The species was also independently renamed twice after the initial naming, first by Francis de Castelnau in 1873 as Sillago bostockii, and then Gilbert Percy Whitley in 1944 who named the species Sillago frazeri (or S. fraseri). These two names are considered to be junior synonyms under the ICZN naming rules, and are considered invalid.

The species is known primarily as the 'yellowfin whiting' or 'yellow-finned whiting' in reference to the yellow pectoral, anal and caudal fins, and is recognised as such by the Australian Government. In Western Australia, the species is usually referred to as the 'western sand whiting' due to its close similarity with the sand whiting (Sillago ciliata) of Eastern Australia, with the name 'fine-scaled whiting' rarely used.

== Description ==
The yellowfin whiting has a similar body profile to most other Australian sillaginids, with colour and swimbladder morphology the simplest identifying features. It is one of the largest members of the Sillaginidae, growing to a known maximum known length of 42 cm and a weight of 860 g. The body is elongate and compressed, with the dorsal profile more arched than the ventral. The mouth is small and oblique, having a broad band of villiform teeth in each jaw. There are two slightly separated dorsal fins, the first consisting of 10 to 12 spines and the second of 1 spine followed by 19 to 22 soft rays. The anal fin consists of 2 spines followed by 17 to 20 soft rays, the ventral of 1 spine and 5 soft rays and the pectoral of 15 to 16 rays. The caudal fin is emarginate, and is made up of 17 rays. The body is covered in small ctenoid scales extending to the upper head and nostrils of the fish, also present behind each ray of the dorsal and anal fins. The lateral line has 66 to 76 scales, and the cheek has 4 or 5 rows of scales, all of which are ctenoid. There is a total of 37 vertebrae in the species. The swimbladder has an incised anterior margin with no median or anterolateral projections and there is a single tapering posterior extension which rapidly narrows to a slender tube. A duct like process is present on the ventral surface of the swimbladder.

The yellowfin whiting is a sandy brown to pale silvery grey colour, with a darker dorsal surface and paler underside. There is a narrow silver mid-lateral band with a brownish band above, although these bands may be pale or indistinct. The dorsal fins are both hyaline with rows of small brown spots and the anal fins are pale yellow with a cream margin. The ventral fins are also yellowish, and the pectoral fin is pale yellow to hyaline with a fine dusting and lacks a dark spot at the base. As yellowfin whiting grow, the yellow colour of the fins often fades and in large specimens may be completely absent. The caudal fin is greyish.

== Distribution and habitat ==
The yellowfin whiting is endemic to the waters of the eastern Indian Ocean off south west Australia, and is believed to exist as two separate populations, one in Western Australia and the other in South Australia. The western population extends from Dampier, south to Albany, with no records of the species between Albany and Spencer Gulf further west. The southern population occurs in Spencer Gulf and Gulf St Vincent, extending eastward to the Fleurieu Peninsula.

Yellowfin whiting primarily inhabit shallow protected inshore waters in depths of less than 10 m, often moving across tidal flats less than a meter deep. They are commonly found on sand flats, bars and spits, as well as mangrove lined tidal creeks, mud flats, seagrass beds and estuaries. Yellowfin whiting move with the tide, pushing into the shallows of creeks and flats to forage at high tide and moving back to the sandy hollows of deeper slopes of channels and banks as the tide falls. In Western Australia, they often enter large, sandy estuaries such as the Swan and Leschenault Estuary where they many penetrate the limits of brackish water, indicating they can survive in low salinity environments. Conversely, they have been recorded in the extremely saline waters of upper Spencer Gulf and Shark Bay, suggesting a wide tolerance to salinity. Juveniles inhabit the same environments as adults in South Australia, but in Western Australia adults move from the tidal creeks and seagrass beds to more sand dominated environments including high energy beaches.

== Biology ==
The yellowfin whiting is a schools species, with its movements highly controlled by tidal phases, with the species often moving over shallow sand banks with the rising tide. Where it occurs with other species of sillaginids, it is unique in that it remains in the shallow protected inshore waters, while other species move offshore as they grow. This is likely a response to reduce interspecific competition between sillaginids. The dietary and reproductive biology of the yellowfin whiting has been extensively studied in Western and South Australia, where it comprises a major part of the fishery. As with a number of other sillaginids, the species has been recorded 'burrowing' in the substrate to avoid predators.

=== Diet and feeding ===
The yellowfin whiting is a benthic predator, using its well developed eyesight and a downward pointing jaws that can be protruded to 'suck up' and capture its prey from the seafloor. Studies on the mouth morphology of a range of sillaginids concluded that the mouth morphology of most species has little influence on the type of prey caught, with differences in diet more likely due to variations in the foraging behavior. Studies conducted in southwest Western Australia found the species predominantly takes polychaetes as its main prey item, although crustaceans, particularly amphipods and penaeids also make up a large portion of its diet. Items taken infrequently or in lesser amounts include small teleost fish, bivalve molluscs, marine plant material and other crustaceans such as tanaids, decapods and cumaceans. Modeling with the stable isotopes ^{13}C and ^{15}N indicate that seagrass and epiphytic algae were the primary initial sources of energy and nutrition that flow into the fish via detritivores which the species preys on, with salt marsh plants and macroalgae contributing in some settings.

The species is known to undergo a dietary shift as it grows to adulthood. Young individuals less than 10 cm in length consume considerable volumes of copepods and minor amounts of polychaetes, but once they reach around 10 cm, the diet shifts to a polychaete-dominated one. Further growth sees an increase in the volume of amphipods, small fish and oligochaetes taken. These changes appear to be unrelated to mouth morphology, instead the fish becomes more mobile and possesses a larger mouth to be able to take these prey. The yellowfin whitings' diet also varies spatially and temporally, which appears to be a function of prey availability at different sites and periods of the year. There is little resource partitioning between the small individuals of sillaginids which inhabit shallow inshore habitats, with Sillago vittata, S. burrus and Sillaginodes punctatus also taking copepods as their primary prey in southwest Western Australia. This changes as each species grows, with S. vittata and S burrus moving to deeper waters to avoid interspecific competition, whilst the remaining S. schomburgkii and Sillaginodes punctatus partition the resources, with S. punctatus consuming more decapods and shrimps.

=== Reproduction and growth ===
Yellowfin whiting reach sexual maturity at a length of 200 mm in males and 230 mm in females, with the majority of both sexes reaching this length by the end of their second year of life. The timing of spawning varies over the species range, a trait found in a number of other sillaginids. In the northernmost part of its range in Shark Bay, spawning occurs between August and December, while further south off southern Western Australia, spawning occurs between December and February. The South Australian population also spawns between December and February, with this event preceded by the movement of fish into shallow tidal and estuarine regions where spawning occurs. Ripe fish then break off the main schooling body to form smaller spawning schools, where the eggs are shed. There is conflicting data concerning the pattern of spawning in yellowfin whiting, with an earlier Shark Bay study finding the species to be a single spawner, whilst recent studies in the south indicate they are multiple spawners. In South Australia, once spawning has occurred the fish disperse and move further offshore once again.

Females release between 170,000 and 217,000 eggs per season, with these eggs being pelagic and spherical, with a diameter of 0.6 mm. The development and morphology of the newly hatched larvae has been extensively described in the ichthyological literature. By the time they reach 2.7 mm, the mouth and gut are functional, the eyes are pigmented, a gas bladder is present, and yolk absorption is complete. The larvae are elongate, having 36 to 38 myomeres, with flexion occurring by 4.8 mm. The juveniles appear in Western Australian estuaries during March, with subsequent growth being fairly rapid. However, the yellowfin whiting is one of the slower growing sillaginids, but reaches a much larger maximum size than most of its relatives, with a known maximum length of 42 cm. On average, individuals measure 8 cm after their first year and weigh between 60 and 190 g, while by the end of their second year they have attained 24 cm, with females thought to grow slightly faster than males. The oldest known individual taken was a 12-year-old female that measured 35 cm, while the oldest known male was at least 7 years old and measured 34.8 mm.

== Relationship to humans ==
The yellowfin whiting is a highly rated table fish, but often considered slightly inferior to the King George whiting, which often occurs in similar areas. Due to its popularity and abundance in both South and Western Australia, it has become a major target for commercial and recreational fishermen, although major declines in population numbers have limited the resources. Roland McKay has also suggested the species has aquaculture potential, especially with its high tolerance to varying salinity levels.

=== Commercial fishery ===
There are two major fisheries in operation for yellowfin whiting; one in the Gulfs of South Australia and another in Shark Bay, Western Australia. There are also up to four minor fisheries in Western Australia, centered in the Blackwood River estuary, Geographe Bay, the Leschenault Estuary and Cockburn Sound. Fishing methods employed commonly include beach seines, bottom set gill nets along creek edges, ring nets, and long gill nets set on sand banks. Nets are usually set in the mornings in South Australia, when fish often move from the tidal flats back into the deeper channels. The two major fishery areas have produced very large numbers of fish in the past, with the South Australian catch representing up to 65% of the entire catch from the gulfs in the late 1970s. In Shark Bay, the largest known annual catch was 204 tonnes during 1961. This has dropped substantially, and current Shark Bay catches have fluctuated between 100 and 130 tonnes per year since 1990, with the 2003 catch around 110 tonnes. Including the minor fisheries catches of Western Australia, the total WA yellowfin whiting catch was 131.4 tonnes, and made up over 95% of the total whiting catch in the state. South Australia has similar modern catch numbers, with the fishery recovering from a major downturn in the late 1980s, when the catch dropped below 20 tonnes per year for an unknown reason. Concerns were raised about previous over-exploitation, but catch numbers have since recovered to levels of around 150–170 tonnes per year.

=== Recreational fishery ===
Yellowfin whiting have become a major target for anglers in both South and Western Australia for a number of reasons: they are very good table fish, they provide good sport on light line, and are easily accessible from beaches and jetties, with a boat not necessary for their capture. Yellowfin whiting are actually most commonly targeted from beaches, estuaries and jetties constructed over shallow waters, with good catches often made on the ingoing and outgoing period of the tide. Due to their easily spooked nature, tackle used to capture the fish is usually very light, with lines kept below 6 kg, hooks below size 4, and sinkers to an absolute minimum as heavy lines and sinkers often scare away the fish. Specialist whiting fishermen often attach a red bead or piece of tubing directly above the hook to attract the fish, although the usefulness of this is debated. The most common bait used is 'beach worms', which may be from a variety of families, with prawns, cockles and squid occasionally taking good catches also. Lure and fly fishing for the species is poorly developed, with their shy nature preventing these methods from being effectively used.

The recreational catch often is greater than the commercial catch in some areas, with a survey carried out in Blackwood River indicating 120 700 fish were taken in a year by anglers. A similar survey conducted in the South Australian Gulfs found recreational fishermen accounted for 28% of the entire yellowfin whiting taken during the 2000/2001 period, representing over 50 tonnes of fish. Recreational bag limits have been put in place to prevent over-exploitation by anglers in both states, with South Australia imposing a minimum size limit of 24 cm and a bag limit of 20 fish on anglers. In Western Australia, there is no minimum size limit, but a bag limit of 40 fish in combination with school whitings (Sillago bassensis and Sillago vittata).
