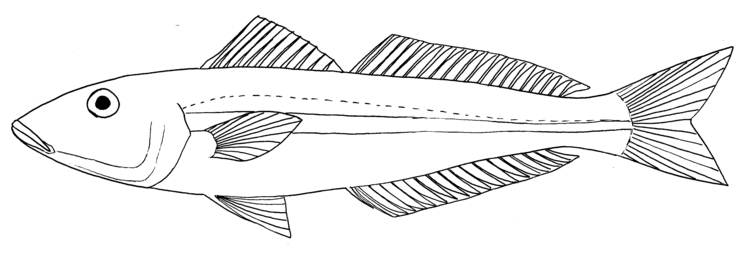

Scientific classification
- Domain: Eukaryota
- Kingdom: Animalia
- Phylum: Chordata
- Class: Actinopterygii
- Order: Acanthuriformes
- Family: Sillaginidae
- Genus: Sillago
- Species: S. robusta

Binomial name
- Sillago robusta Stead, 1908
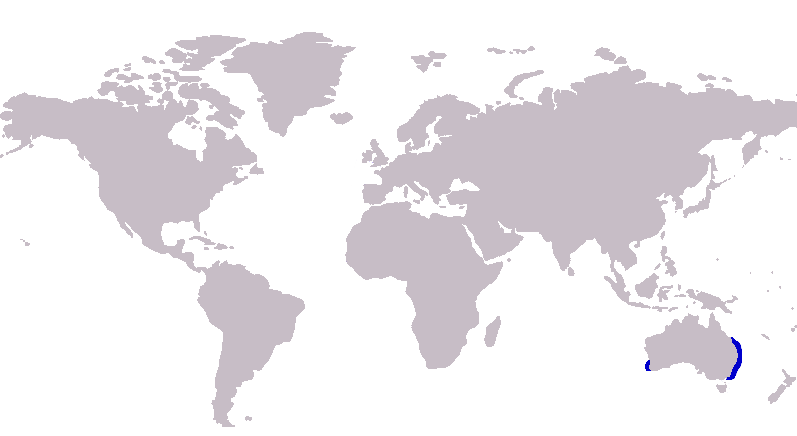
- Range of the stout whiting

= Stout whiting =

Species of fish

The stout whiting (Sillago robusta), also known as the yellow-cheek whiting or school whiting, is a species of benthic marine fish in the smelt-whiting family Sillaginidae. Like other sillaginids, it is an elongate, slightly compressed fish, growing to a maximum known length of 30 cm. The stout whiting is endemic to Australia, with the species divided into western and eastern populations, with the western population ranging from Shark Bay to Fremantle and the eastern population from Bustard Head, Queensland to northern New South Wales. The species inhabits deep, sandy continental shelf regions to a depth of at least 70 m.

The stout whiting is a benthic carnivore, consuming a variety of polychaetes and crustaceans. The species grows rapidly, and sexual maturity is reached at a length of 13 cm, with spawning occurring between December and March. Juveniles of the eastern population move to protected inshore waters, while those of the western population remain offshore their entire life.

Stout whiting are the subject of a major export fishery operating out of southern Queensland and to a lesser extent New South Wales, with fishery authorities limiting the yearly catch to 1000 tonnes in Queensland. Most of the catch is exported frozen to a number of Asian countries, although small quantities are sold in Australia, with the net worth of the fishery values at around 3 million Australian dollars per year.

== Taxonomy and naming ==
The stout whiting is one of over 30 species in the genus Sillago, which is one of five genera belonging to the smelt whiting family Sillaginidae, this family was previously considered to be part of the Percoidea, a suborder of the Perciformes. The 5th edition of Fishes of the World classifies the Sillaginidae in the order Spariformes.

The species was first scientifically described by Stead in 1908 based on a specimen collected from Rose Bay in Port Jackson, New South Wales, which was designated to be the holotype. After this description and naming, the species was once again described and named by William Ogilby in 1910 as Sillago auricomis, based on a specimen taken from near Hervey Bay in Queensland. This is considered to be junior synonym under ICZN naming rules and has subsequently been discarded. During a comprehensive revision of the sillaginids in 1985, Roland McKay noted that the eastern and western populations of fish varied slightly in their fin osteology and swimbladder morphology, but recommended a full osteological comparison before placing them in subspecies ranks. McKay also postulates that the two populations became separated during the last ice age, when a land bridge closed the Torres Strait to the movement of the species.

The species is most commonly known as the 'stout whiting', and is recognised as such by the Australian Government. The species is occasionally called the 'yellow-cheek whiting' and also 'school whiting', a broad name applied to a number of Australian sillaginids.

== Description ==
The stout whiting is similar in appearance to a number of Australian sillaginids, with dorsal fin and swimbladder morphology the best identification features. It is a small fish, reaching a known maximum length of 30 cm, but more commonly seen below 23 cm. Like most sillaginids, the stout whiting has a slightly more convex dorsal profile compared to the ventral profile, reflecting the benthic nature of the species. The dorsal fin is composed of 2 sections; the first consisting of 11 spines and the second of 1 spine followed by 16 to 18 soft rays. Large specimens show a distinct anterior keel on the first spine of the first dorsal fin, with this feature being more pronounced in the eastern population. The anal fin is similar to the second dorsal fin, having 2 spines followed by 16 or 19 soft rays. The lateral line has 65-70 scales, whilst the cheek has 2 to 3 rows of cteniod scales, and there are 33 vertebrae in total. The swimbladders of the two populations are slightly different, with the eastern population having small anterolateral extensions, while the western population lack these. There is a single tapering posterior extension and a duct like process which runs from the ventral surface to the urogenital opening.

In life, the stout whiting is a creamy yellow to sandy pink colour dorsally, with a silvery white with mauve reflections ventrally. The dorsal and ventral colours are sharply separated by a silvery mid lateral band that is often only weakly visible. The body and fins are devoid of any dark markings, with the only breaks in colouration being yellow blotches on the cheeks and a yellow blotch on the base of the first dorsal fin. The first dorsal fin has a white base, becoming darker dorsally, while the anal fin is white, becoming more yellow at the base of the fin. The caudal fin is a pale lemon yellow with a speckled margin, the pelvic fins are white to hyaline and the pectoral fins are hyaline. There have been records of geographical variation in colour amongst the species, especially within Shark Bay. The Shark Bay fish may have faint gold bars trending 50 degrees above the mid lateral silvery band, and may have black dusting on the dorsal and anal fins.

== Distribution and habitat ==
Stout whiting are endemic to Australia, and consist of two apparently disjunct populations; one on the eastern seaboard, the other on the western seaboard. The eastern population has a wider distribution, inhabiting waters from Bustard Head, Queensland to southern New South Wales. The western population exists from Shark Bay in the north to Fremantle in the south. In his 1985 revision of the Sillaginidae, McKay reported the species from as far north as the Gulf of Carpentaria, but did not mention any specimen from this far north in his follow-up catalogue for the FAO.

Stout whiting are found in deeper waters than other Australian sillaginids, inhabiting sandy substrates at depths of 10 to 70 m. juvenile fish of the eastern population inhabit shallower waters for the first year of life, often in large bays and near surf beaches. The fish of the western population spend their entire lives offshore. In northern Australia, the same offshore niche is occupied by the mud whiting, Sillago lutea. In southern Queensland, where it coexists in deeper waters with S. flindersi, the stout whiting shows preference for deep sandy strata with a riverine influence.

== Biology ==
Due to the emergence of stout whiting as a major east coast fishery, a number of detailed studies have been undertaken to determine the reproductive and growth characteristics of the species in southern Queensland, while a series of studies in southern Western Australia have focused on the diet and movements of the species in relation to the ecology of coexisting sillaginids. Like most smelt-whitings, the stout whiting is a schooling species, occasionally associating with S. vitttata, S. burrus and S. bassensis in southern Western Australia and with S. flindersi in southern Queensland. The species is thought to form large schools mostly at dawn and dusk.

=== Diet and feeding ===
Stout whiting are benthic predators that forage the sea floor using their protrusile jaws to 'suck up' prey from the substrate. Research conducted in southern Queensland indicates the species preys mostly on crustaceans and polychaete worms. Individuals less than 10 cm predominantly consume small crustaceans such as copepods and mysids, while older fish took more polychaetes. Amphipods and the shrimp genus Callianassa were also commonly taken in this study. In southern Queensland, there is also a strong temporal control on the diet, with summer months showing much higher polychaete intake compared to crustaceans and vice versa in winter. A detailed study in southern Western Australia indicated amphipods and polychaetes are the two primary components of this population's diet. Penaeids, ostracods, ophiuroid echinoderms and a variety of molluscs also make up a significant part of the species diet in this area. Once again, larger fish took more polychaetes, and in general broadened their diet with increasing age. This resulted in a low dietary overlap with other coexisting sillaginids present in the same area.

The stout whiting is also a major prey species itself for a number of species, with seals, dolphins and larger fish known predators of the species.

=== Reproduction and growth ===
The stout whiting reaches sexual maturity by the end of its second year of life, with around 50% of fish accomplishing this after only one year. The fish are around 13 cm once they reach sexual maturity. The patterns of spawning and movement of the juveniles differs between the eastern and western populations. In the western population, unlike many co-occurring sillaginids, stout whiting do not move inshore to spawn and the juveniles do not make their way to shallower waters; instead they spawn offshore, with the fish spending their entire lives in this environment. In contrast, the eastern population do use inshore nursery areas for the juveniles including bays and surf beaches, with this difference between populations attributed to increased competition between sillaginids by some authors. In both populations, spawning occurs over summer, with the fish spawning multiple times between December and March.

Stout whiting are fast growers in comparison to most other smelt-whitings, reaching 80% of its final length after 2 years of life. The species is known to reach a maximum age of 7 years, although most individuals do not survive more than 3 years.

== Relationship to humans ==
Stout whiting, like most of the smelt-whitings are considered to be good quality table fish, although have soft flesh which results in a tendency to bruise easily. Due to their mostly offshore nature and small size, they are rarely targeted or caught by recreational fishermen, who take an estimated 1 tonne per year. They are however are a major target for commercial operators, especially in southern Queensland. The Queensland fishery originated in 1981, after a single operator began targeting eastern school whiting, S. flindersi. It was soon discovered that stout whiting were highly abundant in the surrounding region and the fishery began to shift towards the species. The original operator who realised the potential of the fishery continued after the market took a downfall, upgrading equipment with a new snap freezing facility, which became essential for exporting the fish. There was a rapid expansion in the fishery between 1989 and 1990, with 10 operators recording a 1789 tonne haul in 1990. In 1991 the market once again took a downfall due to low demand, and the fishery is now closely monitored by fishery authorities, with a 1000 tonne limit on the total yearly catch in place since 2000. This limit includes the fish taken as bycatch in other fisheries such as prawn trawling, which means often a sizable amount must be discarded.

In New South Wales, stout whiting were mostly discarded by trawlers until an export market developed in the 1970s. Substantial amounts are taken and mostly discarded by prawn trawlers, and the catch has been stable at around 300-500 tonnes per year since 2000. The western population is not highly exploited.

The fishery is worth a reported 3 million Australian dollars annually (around $2.80 per kg in 1999), with the fish exported to Thailand, China, Vietnam, Japan and Taiwan. These exported fish compete with local Asian sillaginids, especially northern whiting and Japanese whiting, resulting in substantial price fluctuations. Few fish make their way to local markets where they are sold as butterfly fillets.
