= Sand whiting =

- Sand whiting taken near Byron Bay, New South Wales

Conservation status
- Least Concern (IUCN 3.1)

Scientific classification
- Kingdom: Animalia
- Phylum: Chordata
- Class: Actinopterygii
- Division: Teleostei
- Order: Acanthuriformes
- Family: Sillaginidae
- Genus: Sillago
- Species: S. ciliata

Binomial name
- Sillago ciliata Cuvier, 1829
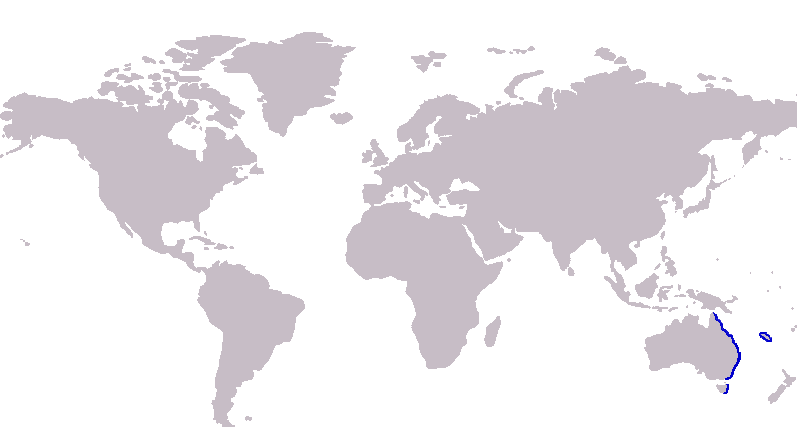
- Range of the Sand whiting

Synonyms
- S. diadoi Thiollière, 1857; S. insularis Castelnau, 1873; S. terra-reginae Castelnau, 1878; S. ciliata diadoi Whitley, 1932

Species of fish

The sand whiting (Sillago ciliata), also known as the summer whiting, yellowfin whiting or blue-nose whiting, is a common species of coastal marine fish of the family Sillaginidae, the smelt-whitings. It is a slender, slightly compressed fish that is very similar to other species of Sillago, with detailed spine, ray and lateral line scale counts needed to distinguish the species between its nearest relative Sillago analis. The sand whiting is distributed along the east coast of Australia from Cape York south to Tasmania, as well as Lord Howe Island and New Caledonia in the Pacific Ocean.

The sand whiting commonly inhabits shallow sandy substrates in bays, estuaries and surf zones where it preys on polychaete worms, small crustaceans and bivalve molluscs. Reproduction in the species is variable over its range, generally spawning twice between September and April. Young fish inhabit shallow sand flats, both along the coast and well into the upper reaches of estuaries.

First described in 1829, the species has long been prized as a table fish and is commonly sought by both recreational and commercial fishermen in New South Wales and Queensland. The sand whiting fishery is most prolific in southern Queensland and northern New South Wales where the species is most abundant, often caught along other species of whiting in estuaries and from beaches. Due to its importance as a commercial fish, substantial research has been carried out on the species, especially feasibility studies involving the use of sand whiting in aquaculture.

== Taxonomy and naming ==
The sand whiting is one of over 30 species in the genus Sillago, which is one of five genera belonging to the smelt whiting family Sillaginidae, this family was previously considered to be part of the Percoidea, a suborder of the Perciformes. The 5th edition of Fishes of the World classifies the Sillaginidae in the order Spariformes.

The species was first identified and named by the French naturalist Georges Cuvier in 1829 after receiving a specimen that was listed as having been collected in the "Southern seas". This holotype specimen was apparently taken near the coastline of Tasmania, Australia. Four junior synonyms were subsequently placed on the species, with Castelnau applying both S. insularis and S. terra-reginae, Thiollière applying S. diadoi and Whitley S. ciliata diadoi to the species. All of these names are invalid under the ICZN nomenclature rules, which states that the first correct naming is the one to be used. Many of these synonyms were applied due to confusion over S. ciliata and the nearly identical, closely related species S. analis. The species was also misidentified as S. gracilis, a synonym of S. maculata, the trumpeter whiting; and also S. bassensis, the southern school whiting.

S. ciliata is most commonly called the 'sand whiting' in reference to its preference for sandy substrates compared to some members of the genus which prefer muddy, silty, or grassy substrates. Other common names include the 'blue-nose whiting' in reference to the colour of the nose in fish of larger sizes, and 'summer whiting', a name often applied to S. analis as well. This name is applied to these species as they move from deeper offshore waters into shallow beach and estuarine waters in summer, where they become a target for recreational fishers.

== Description ==
Three sand whiting

The sand whiting has a very similar profile to other members of the genus Sillago, with a slightly compressed, elongate body tapering toward the terminal mouth. The dorsal fin is in two parts, the first made of feeble spines and the second of soft rays headed by a single feeble spine, while the ventral profile is straight. The species is known to grow to a maximum size of 51 cm and around 1.25 kg weight.

The fin anatomy is highly useful for identification purposes, with the species having 11 spines in the first dorsal fin, with one spine and 16 or 18 soft rays on the second dorsal fin. The anal fin has two spines with 15 to 17 soft rays posterior to the spines. Lateral line scales and cheek scales are also distinctive, with sand whiting possessing 60 to 69 lateral line scales and cheek scales positioned in 3-4 rows, all of which are ctenoid. The amount of vertebrae are also diagnostic, having 32 to 34 in total. The swim bladder has rudimentary tubules projecting anteriorly and a series laterally that diminish in size and become sawtooth-like posteriorly. The posterior extension is a single, tapering projection that extends well into the caudal region. A duct like process extends from the ventral surface to the urogenital opening. Swim bladder morphology is useless when determining between S. ciliata and S. analis, as they are nearly identical.

The body is a pale brown or silvery brown colour, transitioning to white below, with green, mauve and rosy reflections when the fish is first removed from the water. An indistinct silver-yellow mid-lateral band extends across some specimens. The spinous dorsal fin is olive green with faint darker blotches, the second dorsal fin also a pale olive with rows of dark brown to blackish spots. The anal and ventral fins are pale yellow, the pectorals are pale yellow to pale brown with a well defined dark blue-black blotch at the base. The caudal fin is yellow to olive in colour with darker margins. Juveniles less than 90 mm may have darker blotches along their sides and backs.

== Distribution and habitat ==
The sand whiting inhabits a range along the east coast of Australia from Cape York, Queensland, southward along the coast and the Great Barrier Reef to eastern Victoria and the east coast of Tasmania down to Southport. The species also inhabits a number of islands; Lord Howe Island, New Caledonia, and Woodlark Island, Papua New Guinea. The species is most abundant in lower Queensland and New South Wales, where studies show it inhabits every estuary sampled throughout the course of a study, while in north Queensland, the species is very patchily distributed along the coast.

The sand whiting is an inshore species, inhabiting exposed coastal areas such as beaches, sandbars and surf zones as well as quieter bays, estuaries and coastal lakes. Sand whiting enter estuaries, including intermittently open ones, and penetrate far upstream to the tidal limits of rivers and creeks where juveniles and adolescent fish may be abundant. The adults congregate around the mouths of estuaries, bars, and spits, in depths down to 5 m where they may constitute a large percentage of the icthyofauna of such regions. As implied by their name, they are often found exclusively over sandy substrates, with occasional appearances in Zostera seagrass beds. Individuals are occasionally taken in offshore waters to 40 m during winter.

== Biology ==
=== Behaviour ===
The sand whiting is a schooling species, whose movements are associated with a variety of factors including prey, lunar patterns and spawning movements; although there appears to be little consistency in its movements in relation to these factors. Studies on the species over the period of a year have shown the species does not change its local distribution over the course of a day, generally being of the same abundance during both night and day. Seasonal abundance due to spawning is variable, with studies conducted in Moreton Bay, Queensland finding the species recruits heavily to shallow waters and increase numbers during winter months, while studies in the Noosa River estuary have shown no difference in numbers recruited over the course of a season. Like other sillaginids, they have the ability to 'burrow' into the sand and remained hidden until a predator or seine net has passed by.

=== Diet ===
The sand whiting's distinctive body shape and mouth placement is an adaptation to bottom feeding, which is the predominant method of feeding for all whiting species. All larger whiting feed by using their protrusile jaws and tube-like mouths to suck up various types of prey from in, on or above the ocean substrate, as well as using their nose as a 'plough' to dig through the substrate. There is a large body of evidence that shows whiting do not rely on visual cues when feeding, instead using a system based on the vibrations emitted by their prey.

S. ciliata is a benthic carnivore that feeds predominantly on polychaetes and various crustaceans. Like other species of Sillago, the diet of the species is related to the size and age of the individual, with three distinct size classes identified in a study conducted in Botany Bay, NSW. The smallest fish of 0–10 cm take large amount of amphipods and few polychaetes, while fish between 11 and 20 cm consume mostly nereid polychaetes and few amphipods. The largest fish over 21 cm take large amounts of bivalve molluscs and shrimps of the genus Callianassa.

=== Reproduction ===
As with many species of fish, the timing of spawning varies over the range of the species, with gonad development indicating that spawning in the southern New South Wales region occurs from December to April, while spawning in southern Queensland occurs from September to February. Spawning takes place twice a year, evident by the two classes of egg size found in the ovaries and by the two recruitment pulses observed each year as young fish enter their juvenile habitats. The spawning takes place at the mouths of estuaries or in surf zones, with the larvae occurring in fully marine waters. Juveniles reach 16.5 cm in length after their first year of life, 26.7 cm after their second year and 30.5 cm after their third year. After the beginning of the spawning season young whiting of 10 mm and over can be observed swimming actively in small droves of from 10 to 20 on the sand flats and beaches to which they are recruited, moving up and down with the tide, swimming in very shallow water to depths of 1 m. Unlike closely related sillaginids, the juveniles usually prefer unprotected sand substrates, while other species tend to use seagrass and mangroves as protection. As they grow older they keep further from the shore.

== Relationship to humans ==
The sand whiting is a highly prized table fish often rated equal to the King George whiting, making it a common target for both commercial and recreational fisheries. The flesh is white, tender and has a moist, low oil content composition, making it easily digestible. Investigations into the aquaculture of the species began in the 1980s, and has led to the development of farmed sand whiting.

=== Commercial fishery ===
Although the sand whiting ranges down to Victoria and Tasmania, the species is not common enough to make up a significant part of their fisheries, with other sillaginids such as school whiting and stout whiting making up the bulk of the catch. In New South Wales and Queensland, however, it is one of the most common species taken, especially in lower Queensland. The species is often not differentiated from golden-lined whiting or trumpeter whiting, meaning fisheries statistics do not reflect the total catch for the species. In 2000, 238 tonnes of whiting were taken in Queensland, a decrease from the past 4 years. The species is primarily taken in estuaries in New South Wales, and is also included under the general heading of 'school whiting' when taken from beaches. Research showed that the average commercial harvest from individual estuaries was around 1-2 tonnes per year, with an increase in most rivers during the 1970s and 80's.

The species is commonly taken by a number of fishing methods, with the most common being seine nets. Ring, fence, fyke netting and beam trawling are also used occasionally, but more often associated with sampling the entire population for research purposes. Research has focused on the effectiveness of different mesh sizes used to net the species in order to prevent juvenile individuals dying after becoming enmeshed. Associated research has also shown that those whiting that survive and are discarded tend to have much lower survival rates due to scale loss, which is a major issue, as many young fish are regularly taken in such nets and released by the fisherman after sustaining scale loss. These studies have led to a number of proposals and subsequent changes to net regulations.

At market, sand whiting is medium priced fish, sold fresh or frozen; whole and in fillet form. In abundance, sand whiting is moderately priced, with fillets being slightly more expensive. The recovery rate of fillets from whole fish is about 40%. Sand whiting may be used as sashimi.

=== Recreational fishery ===
Sand whiting are commonly sought after by anglers due to their reputation as a food fish, and due to their relative accessibility, with large catches possible from many shore-based locations. The catches of recreational fishermen may exceed the catches of professionals, with studies showing Queensland had over twice the amount of fish taken by anglers in 2000.

The species is commonly caught throughout its habitat, with sand flats, tidal gutters in estuaries and surf beaches commonly having producing good catches. Excessively shallow water, especially in proximity to Zostera beds may produce numerous undersized fish, and may be avoided if the young fish are too prevalent. Due to their preferred habitat, light lines with minimal weight added are employed to avoid spooking the fish, with a small running bean or ball sinker commonly rigged above a size 4 or 6 hook. Specialist whiting fishermen often use a red piece of tubing or beads to attract the whiting; whether this works has yet to be proved, but anecdotal evidence shows the fishermen's catches don't suffer. Baits used resemble the species natural prey, with prawns, nippers, a variety of bivalves and beach worms most often used, with more successful catches obtained using live bait.

In New South Wales, sand whiting have a minimum legal length of 27 cm to be taken and a daily personal bag limit of 20 applies, while in Queensland there is a minimum size of 23 cm and a combined bag limit of 30 for all whiting species.

Sand whiting are used themselves as live bait for larger species such as mulloway, mangrove jack and large flathead, although anglers must still adhere to the minimum size limit.

=== Aquaculture ===
The aquaculture potential for sand whiting was first investigated in the late 1980s, with a number of reports detailing both successful trials and also a number of problems with such trials. A 1988 study showed that sand whiting were more likely to grow in captivity than other whiting species, but the mortality rate of over 50% was unacceptable for use in an economic setting. A number of problems with diseases such as ulcerative dermatitis and the failure of the swim-bladder to inflate properly were also documented, however many of these initial problems have been overcome, and some facilities are breeding around 2000 larvae with a 95% survival rate. Some of these fingerlings are used to restock depleted estuaries, while others form the basis of commercial fish crops.
