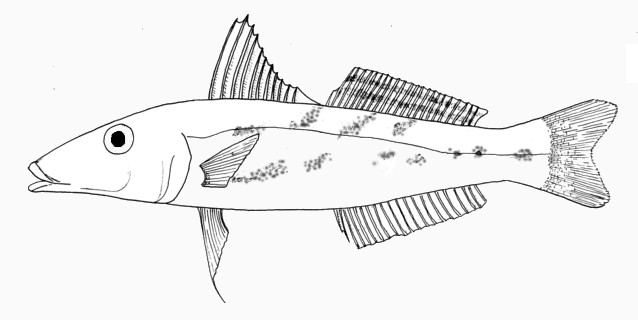

Scientific classification
- Kingdom: Animalia
- Phylum: Chordata
- Class: Actinopterygii
- Order: Acanthuriformes
- Family: Sillaginidae
- Genus: Sillago
- Species: S. aeolus

Binomial name
- Sillago aeolus D. S. Jordan & Evermann, 1902
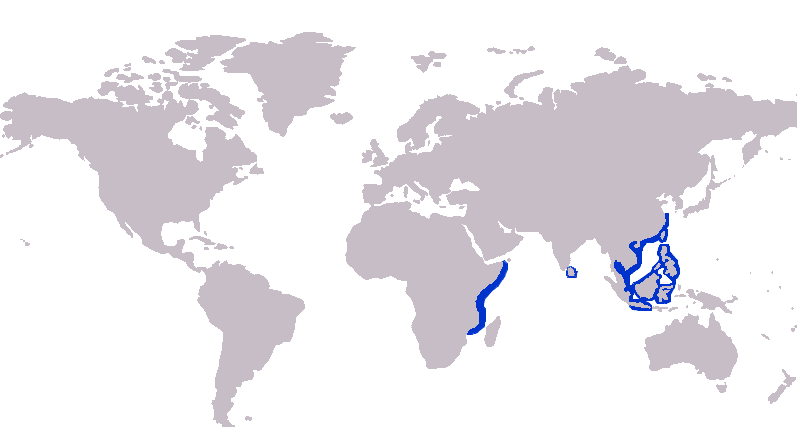
- Range of the oriental trumpeter whiting

Synonyms
- Sillago maculata aeolus Jordan & Evermann, 1902

= Oriental trumpeter whiting =

Species of fish

The oriental trumpeter whiting (Sillago aeolus) is a widely distributed species of benthic inshore fish in the smelt-whiting family. The species ranges from east Africa to Japan, inhabiting much if the southern Asian and Indonesian coastlines. Its morphology is very similar to other species within the genus Sillago, with a long, compressed body and silvery overall colour. It can be distinguished from its relatives by colour patterns and particularly swim bladder morphology, which helps define most species of Sillago. S aeolus is a benthic predator, consuming a variety of crustaceans and polychaetes. As with most members of the smelt whiting family, it is important to small coastal fisheries in various areas of its range.

== Taxonomy and naming ==
The oriental trumpeter whiting is one of over 30 species in the genus Sillago, which is one of five genera belonging to the smelt whiting family Sillaginidae, this family was previously considered to be part of the Percoidea, a suborder of the Perciformes. The 5th edition of Fishes of the World classifies the Sillaginidae in the order Spariformes.

The oriental trumpeter whiting was first officially identified and named Sillago aeolus by Jordan and Evermann in 1902 from the holotype collected in Taiwan, after a number of taxonomists had misidentified the species as Sillago macrolepis (Bleeker) or Sillago maculata (Quoy & Gaimard, 1824). S. aeolus has a number of common names in different countries, with the most common, oriental trumpeter whiting derived from the fact the species has a similar colour and pattern to the Trumpeter whiting, Sillago maculata. Other names commonly applied to S. aeolus include Hoshi-gisu (Japan), Ebi (Malaysia), Oso-so (Philippines) and 'Asuhos'.

== Description ==
As with most of the genus Sillago, the oriental trumpeter whiting has a slightly compressed, elongate body tapering toward the terminal mouth, reaching a maximum overall length of 30 cm. The body is covered in small ctenoid scales extending to the cheek and head. The first dorsal fin has 11 spines and the second dorsal fin has 1 leading spine with 18 to 20 soft rays posterior. The anal fin is similar to the second dorsal fin, but has 2 spines with 17 to 19 (usually 18) soft rays posterior to the spines. Other distinguishing features include 67 to 72 lateral line scales and a total of 34 vertebrae.

Swim bladder morphology is the most effective way to distinguish it between related species S. maculata and S. burrus. The swim bladder has three anterolateral extensions; not four and it differs from S. maculata in lacking well developed anterolateral extensions reaching to the level of the vent.

The colour of the oriental trumpeter whiting is similar to both S. burrus and S. maculata, having blotches that are like oblique bars, but the most posterior mid-lateral dark brown blotch is elongate and reaches caudal flexure. The blotches are not connected as in S. maculata. The belly is silvery to grey coloured.

== Distribution and habitat ==
The oriental trumpeter whiting has a wide distribution, inhabiting many areas of the Indo-Pacific region. The westernmost sighting of the species was in Delagoa Bay, South Africa, with its range extending up the east African coast and to the West Indies, but it has never been recorded near the Indian mainland. The species is most prolific in the Southeast Asian region, with positive identifications from Singapore, Hong Kong, Philippines, Thailand, Malaysia, Indonesia, Taiwan and up to Japan. S. aeolus has also never been recorded in New Guinea or Australia.

The habitat of the oriental trumpeter whiting is largely unknown, but it's known to live in inshore coastal waters, commonly in embayments on silty bottoms in water depths from 0 – 60m depth. Juveniles often enter the surf zone of beaches, mixing with juveniles from other species of Sillago.

== Biology ==
The diet of S. aeolus changes as the fish progresses from a juvenile to an adult. Juveniles primarily eat small zooplankton, such as calanoid copepods while adults tend to consume larger benthic prey, such as polychaetes, shrimps, and crabs. Examination of the gut of adults has shown the latter three items were the most important prey, together constituting more than 70% of stomach contents by volume. There does not appear to be any seasonal shift in diet in either juveniles or adults of the species.

Oriental trumpeter whiting are reproductively mature at around 130mm in 50% of fish, with the minimum a length of 113mm in males and 109mm in females. They are multiple spawners, that spawn continuously throughout the year with peaks in reproduction that appear to vary geographically. Studies in Thailand indicate the peak is between July and December, while studies in Japan show a peak in February to May. Otolith studies show both females and males attained 60% and 91% of individuals at maturity respectively at the end of their first year of life. The attainment of large size by the end of the first year of life is of considerable advantage, since many individuals do not survive until the end of their second year.

== Relationship to humans ==
Throughout the oriental trumpeter whiting's range, it is often caught in trawls and is of minor importance to local fisheries. The flesh spoils easily and is not as highly rated as other sillaginids. It is a commercial fish in Southern Japan, where most of the fish are caught by gill net for local consumption. As opposed to most areas, the species is well known for its delicate texture in Japan.
