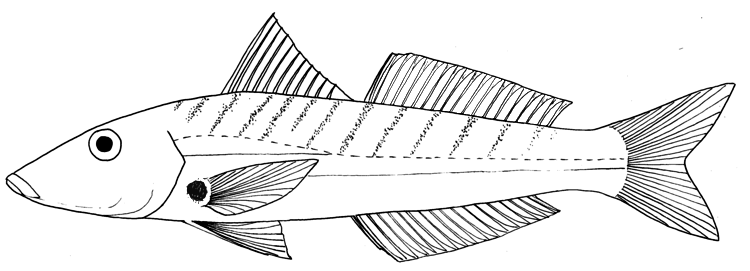

Scientific classification
- Kingdom: Animalia
- Phylum: Chordata
- Class: Actinopterygii
- Order: Acanthuriformes
- Family: Sillaginidae
- Genus: Sillago
- Species: S. vittata

Binomial name
- Sillago vittata McKay, 1985
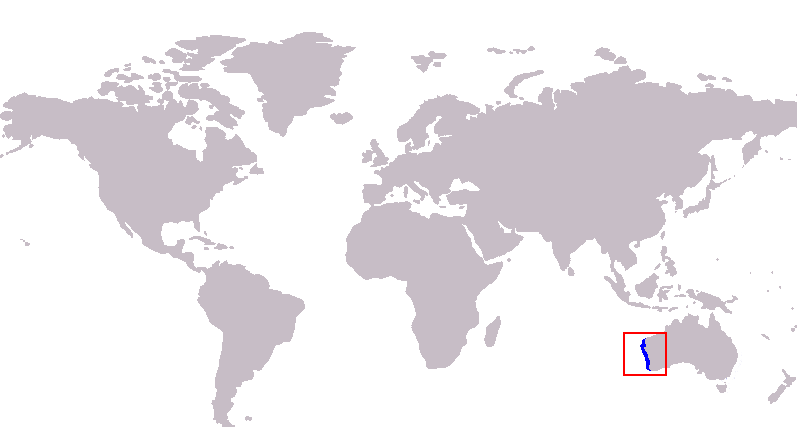
- Range of the western school whiting

= Western school whiting =

Species of fish

The western school whiting (Sillago vittata), also known as the banded whiting, golden whiting and bastard whiting, is a species of benthic marine fish in the smelt-whiting family Sillaginidae. The species is one of three 'school whiting' that inhabit southern Australia and share a very similar appearance. Western school whiting are known to grow to 30 cm in length and 275 g in weight, although unconfirmed reports suggest this might be an underestimate. The western school whiting is distributed along the Western Australian coast from Maud Landing in the north to Rottnest Island in the south. The species inhabits both shallow inshore environments and waters to depths of 55 m. The species is a benthic predator, taking a variety of crustaceans, molluscs and echinoderms, and shows a change in diet with age and habitat. S. vittata is a multiple spawner, reproducing between December and February once it has reached one or two years of age. Juveniles inhabit protected inshore waters, moving offshore once they reach sexual maturity. It is often found in association with other sillaginids and comprises a minor fraction of commercial whiting catches in Western Australia.

== Taxonomy and naming ==
The western school whiting is one of over 30 species in the genus Sillago, which is one of five genera belonging to the smelt whiting family Sillaginidae, this family was previously considered to be part of the Percoidea, a suborder of the Perciformes. The 5th edition of Fishes of the World classifies the Sillaginidae in the order Spariformes.

The western school whiting was first scientifically described by Roland McKay in 1985, who was the first to recognize it apart from Sillago bassensis. McKay designated a specimen caught off north east Rottnest Island to be the holotype, also designating several paratypes. The species is commonly referred to as the 'western school whiting' in Australian literature, causing confusion with Sillago bassensis, which was previously given this name before S. vittata was described. It is also known as the 'banded whiting' and 'golden whiting' in reference to its colouring, as well as the 'bastard whiting' by fishermen. The specific name, vittata is derived from the Latin 'vittatus', meaning 'banded'.

== Description ==
The western school whiting is similar in appearance to a number of geographically overlapping sillaginids, with colouring and swimbladder morphology the best identification features. The species is known to reach a maximum length of 30 cm and 275 g, although unconfirmed reports from Shark Bay indicate they may grow significantly larger. The external morphology is similar to all sillaginids, having a fairly straight ventral profile and a slightly curved dorsal profile. The dorsal fin is composed of two sections, the first consisting of 11 spines, while the second, longer dorsal has a single spine followed by 17 to 19 soft rays posteriorly. The anal fin has two spines and is followed by 16 to 18 soft rays. The scales are ctenoid in nature except for the cheek scales, of which there are 3 rows, the upper being cycloid and the lower 2 ctenoid. There are 65 to 70 lateral line scales and 32 to 34 vertebrae in total.

The swimbladder is very similar to S. bassensis and S. robusta, with a median anterior extension and very poorly developed anterolateral projections. The posterior median projection is short and a duct like process connects to the ventral surface of the swimbladder.

The western school whiting's head and upper body are tan above, becoming paler below with a silvery white belly surface. In life blue, mauve and yellow reflections are common. In larger, albeit unconfirmed, specimens taken at Shark Bay the colour was a golden yellow shade all over, still having the species characteristic banding. There 8 to 11 of these rusty brown to dark brown bars running obliquely on the sides of the fish, often overlapping a distinct silvery white laterally positioned band. This band begins behind the operculum and continues to the caudal fin base. The spinous dorsal fin is whitish below grading to yellow above, with brown spots and black dusting apically. The second dorsal fin is white basally, becoming lemon yellow above with 3 rows of black blotches forming longitudinal lines across the fin. The anal fin is bright yellow with white margins, the ventrals have a pale yellow center with white margins and the caudal is yellow. The pectoral fin is pale lemon yellow to hyaline with a large round dark brown to bluish brown spot just above the base of the fin.

== Distribution and habitat ==
The western school whiting is only known from the coasts of Western Australia, inhabiting a known range from Maud Landing in the north to Rottnest Island, off Perth, in the south. Reports of an unconfirmed 'narrow-barred whiting' off the coast of Fremantle may also refer to S. vittata, which would extend its range further south. The species inhabits both shallow inshore waters, as well as deeper waters on the continental shelf up to 55 m deep. In shallower waters it inhabits weed banks, coral reef and sandy substrates including beaches, often mingling with other species of sillaginids. Systematic studies in lower Western Australia found the species to be most common between 5 and 15 m deep, attributing this to the need for the juveniles to migrate to deeper areas as they mature.

== Biology ==
The biology and ecology of the western school whiting is relatively well known due to a series of studies conducted by researchers at Murdoch University and the Western Australian Marine Research Laboratories. Western school whiting, as their name suggests, are a schooling species, often mingling with other species of sillaginid. In shallower waters, they are often associated with Sillago burrus, Sillago schomburgkii and Sillago analis, while in deeper offshore waters they are often found with Sillago robusta, Sillago bassensis and Sillago burrus.

=== Diet and feeding ===
The western school whiting is a benthic predator, taking a variety of polychaetes, molluscs, crustaceans and other fish. Dietary studies on the species have demonstrated the dominant components of its diet are errant polychaetes, copepods from the cladoceran and calanoid orders, amphipods and ophiuroid echinoderms. Other lesser taken types of food include sedentary polychaetes, harpacticoids, cumaceans, bivalves and teleosts. Studies also show both geographical and seasonal variability, with the habitat type the main influence on diet. Although habitat strongly controls diet, the age of the individuals also partly determines their diet. Although only a minor change in diet is observed as size increases, dietary breadth increased; that is more different types of prey were taken, with younger fish often, but not always, targeting one specific prey type. In general, juveniles take more copepods with adult diets more amphipod and polychaete dominated. Teleosts were only consumed by larger individuals. This pattern is not seen in all populations of fish, with geographic variation having major impacts on all aspects of diet.

Significant dietary overlaps with a number of co-occurring species of sillaginids is seen in both juvenile and adult stages in different environments. Young fish in their shallow, protected environments show overlap with young S. burrus, S. schomburgkii and Sillaginodes punctatus in their preference for copepods, although the timing of spawning events somewhat decreases this competition. In deeper nearshore waters, there is minor overlap with S. bassensis, but significant differences reduce interspecific competition.

As is the case with other sillaginids, their possession of protrusile jaws and a tube-like mouth are ideal for suction feeding on a wide variety of prey that occur on and in the substrate. Measurements of mouth dimensions suggest S. vittata is able to extend its jaws further downward compared to co-occurring species, which may answer why it consumes more polychaetes than these species.

=== Reproduction and growth ===
The western school whiting does not reach sexual maturity until the end of the first year of its life in deeper waters, while populations that inhabit nearshore waters don't fully reach maturity until the end of the second year. All male fish are mature by the time they reach 130 mm in length and 160 mm in female fish. The species spawns in deeper waters during a period between December and February, with a peak in early January. Anatomical evidence suggests S. vittata is a batch spawner, releasing eggs in batches over a period during the spawning months, possibly to buffer against adverse environmental factors. juveniles reside in protected inshore waters such as bays and mangrove swamps until they reach sexual maturity, when they move offshore to spawn. Western school whiting usually reach 2 years of age, with some individuals surviving up to 7 years, allowing each fish to spawn multiple times throughout its life. The species reaches 30 cm at its maximum length.

== Relationship to humans ==
Western school whiting are taken in relatively small quantities in comparison to other western Australian sillaginids such as Sillago schomburkii and Sillaginodes punctatus, but has a few minor fisheries developed around it. The first is off Rottnest Island, where it is trawled in deeper offshore waters, and also in Shark Bay, where it is one of a number of sillaginids landed. In Shark Bay it can comprise up to 20% of the entire whiting catch, with fishermen giving it the name 'bastard whiting' as large numbers of S. vittata mean lower numbers of their targeted species. Of the approximately 177 000 kg of whiting taken in Western Australia, less than 2152 kg of this is attributable to S. vittata, making it one of the less important fisheries to the state.

Despite the reactions of professional fishermen, western school whiting are considered to have good to excellent flesh for eating, and fetch similar high prices at market to other whiting species. Due to their offshore nature in the south of Western Australia, they are rarely taken by recreational fishermen, while in the northern part of their range where they inhabit shallower waters, they are often overlooked for larger tropical species by anglers. Thus they are not a major recreational fishery either. They respond to the same fishing styles as other whitings, generally using light lines and sinkers with worm or mollusc baits. They are caught off beaches, jetties and from boats. There is no size restriction on the species, but a daily bag limit of 30 per person applies.
