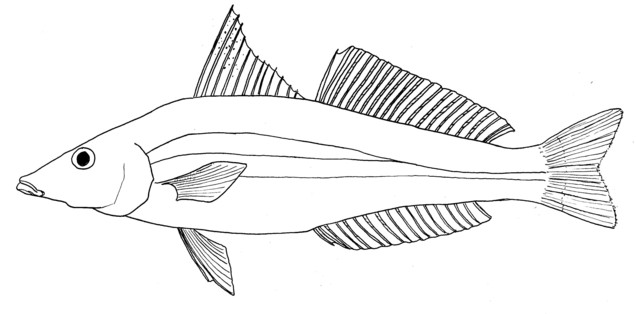

Scientific classification
- Kingdom: Animalia
- Phylum: Chordata
- Class: Actinopterygii
- Order: Acanthuriformes
- Family: Sillaginidae
- Genus: Sillago
- Species: S. analis

Binomial name
- Sillago analis Whitley, 1943
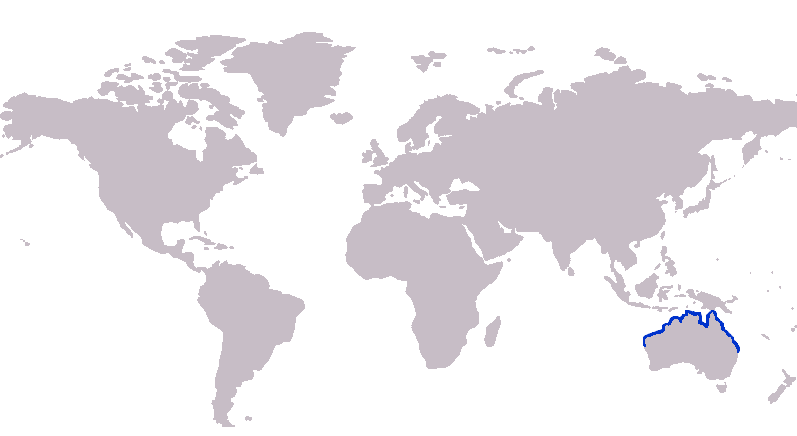
- Range of the golden lined whiting

= Golden lined whiting =

Species of fish

The golden lined whiting (Sillago analis), also known as the Tin Can Bay whiting or rough-scale whiting, is a species of inshore marine fish of the smelt whiting family, Sillaginidae that inhabits the coastlines of northern Australia and lower Papua New Guinea. The golden lined whiting can be more readily distinguished by its colour than other whitings in the genus Sillago, although swim bladder morphology and spine and ray counts are the most precise method of identification. S. analis is an opportunistic predator, taking a variety of crustaceans, polychaetes and molluscs, with a transition of diet seen as the fish mature. One unusual aspect about the species diet is the large amounts of molluscan siphons it takes. The species spawns between January and March, with juvenile fish inhabiting the shallow protected coastal waters. Golden lined whiting is important to fisheries centered on Shark Bay in Western Australia and also in Queensland, although makes up a relatively minor component of the whiting fishery.

== Taxonomy and naming ==
The golden lined whiting is one of over 30 species in the genus Sillago, which is one of five genera belonging to the smelt whiting family Sillaginidae, this family was previously considered to be part of the Percoidea, a suborder of the Perciformes. The 5th edition of Fishes of the World classifies the Sillaginidae in the order Spariformes.

The species was named by Whitley in 1943 as Sillago analis, designating a specimen collected at Shark Bay as the holotype. Another currently valid species of sillaginid, Sillago nierstraszi is according to McKay (1985) almost certainly a senior synonym of S. analis. The holotype for S. nierstraszi has not been examined by McKay, however, and uncertainty about this relationship remains. S. analis has a three local names used in northern Australia, with 'golden lined whiting' the most prevalent. 'Tin Can Bay whiting' is applied to the species in parts of Queensland, referring to the locality of the same name in that state, while the name 'rough-scale whiting is also used in parts of Western Australia.

== Description ==
The golden lined whiting has a very similar profile to other members of the genus Sillago, with a slightly compressed, elongate body tapering toward the terminal mouth. It differs from some members of the genus in that its ventral profile is more rounded than most other species, which tend to have a flat profile. The number of spines and rays, vertebrae and swim bladder morphology are other distinguishing features. S. analis has a first dorsal fin consisting of 11 spines followed by a second dorsal fin consisting of one spine and between 16 and 18 soft rays. The anal fin has 2 spines followed by 14 to 17 soft rays. Over the distribution of the species, the vertebrae number differs, with fish in Western Australia having 33 and those in south east Queensland having one or two additional modified vertebrae. Also varying over the range is the lateral line scale count, with Western Australian fish having less than Queensland fish, with the range for the species between 54 and 61 scales.

The swim bladder of the species is very similar and in some cases indistinguishable from a related species, Sillago ciliata, with the anterior part of the swim bladder having rudimentary tubules projecting anteriorly and a lateral series of tubules that diminishes in size and become sawtooth-like, projecting posteriorly.

The golden lined whiting's common name is derived from its colour, having a dull golden-silver to golden-yellow band running longitudinally on the sides below the lateral line. The body is an overall silver colour, being slightly darker above. The pelvic and anal fins are pale to bright yellow, while the pectoral fin has a darker dusting of fine black-brown spots with no black spot at the base.

== Distribution and habitat ==
The golden lined whiting is located in the southern Indo-Pacific along the northern coastline of Australia, from Shark Bay in Western Australia north along the coastline of the Northern Territory, around the Queensland coastline to Moreton Bay. The species also extends north to the south coast of Papua New Guinea, although inhabits a small range. The species prefers shallow, protected waters up to a maximum of 10 m depth, often inhabiting protected embayments. The juveniles tend to remain in the warmer, shallow waters of protected inlets, mangroves and estuaries, often with other species of whiting. Adults prefer to inhabit protected muddy tidal streams where they forage in the silty substrate, while other species of whiting in the range move to open tidal sand flats.

== Biology ==
=== Diet ===
The diet of the golden lined whiting varies along its range, however it takes similar food and shows the same transition in prey items during its lifetime throughout its distribution. Juvenile fish tend to take a mixture of polychaetes which they 'plough' from the sand, small bivalves, including Mesodesma eltanae and Glauconome virens as well as amphipods while at lengths less than 80 mm. Adult fish tend to take larger prey, predominantly larger bivalves with small quantities of penaeids and brachyuran crabs, which corresponds to a dentitional change to molariform crushing plates. Studies by Brewer et al. (1992) have shown that the Golden lined whiting is an opportunistic nocturnal hunter, taking the most vulnerable, easily accessible prey. This may because they are relatively abundant, poorly shelled or unable to escape quickly. The most commonly caught prey at night were crustaceans, while buried annelids were ignored and molluscs were left alone except for taking the unprotected siphon tips of a species of bivalve; Glauconome virens. A study on the diet of young S. analis from a mangrove tidal flat in Deception Bay in Queensland has shown that the siphon tips of this mollusc comprise the majority of most fish's diet, with very few other molluscs taken whole. Adult fish greater than 200 mm had no siphons in their diet however, electing to take larger molluscs, annelids or crustaceans.

=== Reproduction ===
S. analis spawns between the months of January and March. The females of the species are larger than the males when they reach maturity, attaining a length of 216 mm compared to males 184 mm. Twenty percent of the females and 60% of the males of S. analis reach maturity by the end of their second year of life, with all individuals mature by the end of the third. Juveniles of the species inhabit shallow shores including lower sections of creeks and rivers, favouring muddy-sand substrates also with less than 1 m depth. The species has been known to reach a maximum of 45 cm long.

== Relationship to humans ==
The golden lined whiting is a major commercial species in some parts of its range, particularly in Shark Bay and to a lesser extent in Queensland. It is often taken alongside other species of whiting which also constitute major parts of the local fishery. The amount of fish taken by professionals fluctuates, with an example monthly 1998/1999 catch weighing 5,399 kg, a massive amount less than the 196,293 kg of western sand whiting taken in the same period. Being that the juveniles enter mangrove creeks, the species may be a future candidate for estuarine aquaculture, which has seen other species of sillaginid cultured in Asia.

The species is a common target for recreational fishermen, with large catches possible. Golden lined whiting respond to bait which resembles their normal prey and are taken on yabbies, crabs, soldier crabs, mussels of many different sorts, worms and prawn, in particular jelly prawn. This species will also take a variety of wet flies and small lures. They are commonly caught over their foraging habitats, particularly sand flats, tailing sand banks, shallow and deep weed beds, over yabby beds, and particularly in muddy mangrove areas. The flesh of this whiting is sweet and although slightly softer in texture than the sand whiting, is equal to it for high eating quality.

In Queensland, the minimum size for taking golden lined whiting is 23 cm, and there is a bag limit of 30 combined with sand whiting.
