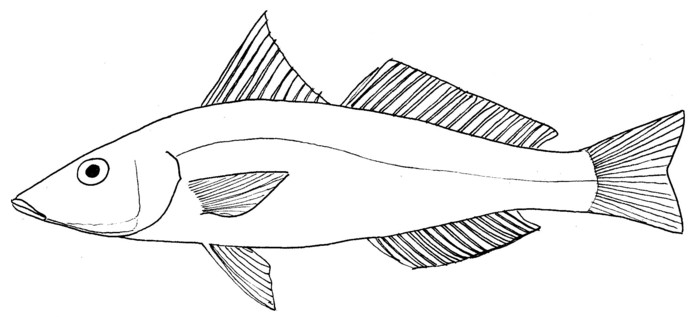

Scientific classification
- Kingdom: Animalia
- Phylum: Chordata
- Class: Actinopterygii
- Order: Acanthuriformes
- Family: Sillaginidae
- Genus: Sillago
- Species: S. nierstraszi

Binomial name
- Sillago nierstraszi Hardenberg, 1941
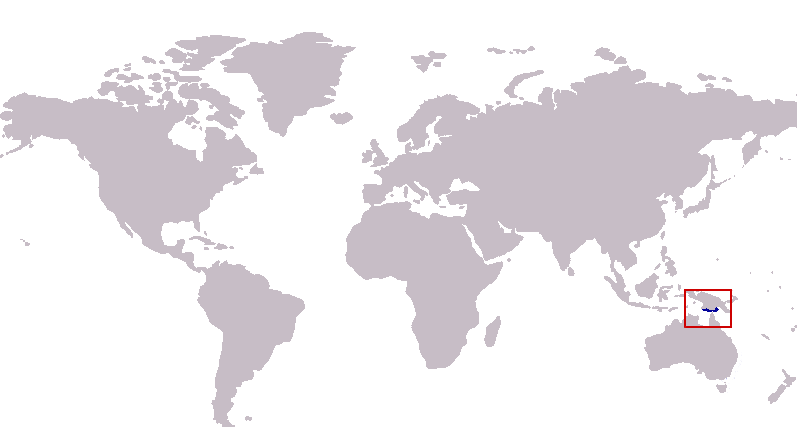
- Range of the rough whiting

= Rough whiting =

Species of fish

The rough whiting (Sillago nierstraszi) is a dubious species of coastal marine fish in the smelt-whiting family Sillaginidae. The species is known only from the holotype which was collected in 1941 on the south coast of Papua New Guinea, but is thought to be lost. S. nierstraszi is currently a valid species, although during his revision of the sillaginids, Roland McKay suggested the species to be a senior synonym of Sillago analis.

== Taxonomy and naming ==
The rough whiting is one of over 30 species in the genus Sillago, which is one of five genera belonging to the smelt whiting family Sillaginidae, this family was previously considered to be part of the Percoidea, a suborder of the Perciformes. The 5th edition of Fishes of the World classifies the Sillaginidae in the order Spariformes.

The species was first described by J. Hardenberg in 1941 in a synopsis of the Fishes of New Guinea based on the holotype specimen which was collected from Merauke on the southern coast of New Guinea. This remains the only specimen ever collected of the fish, and appears to be lost after McKay was unable to locate it during his revision of the family. He furthermore suggested it to be a senior synonym of Sillago analis, due to the two species sharing many characteristics.

== Etymology ==
The fish is named in honor of Hugo Frederik Nierstrasz (1872-1937), a marine biologist at Utrecht University, and a member of the 1899-1900 Siboga Expedition to the Dutch East Indies which is now Indonesia.

== Description ==
Like all sillaginids, the rough whiting has an elongate compressed body profile which tapers toward the small terminal mouth. The first spinous dorsal fin has 11 spines and the second dorsal fin has one spine and 17 soft rays. The anal fin has two spines and 17 soft rays. Between the base of first dorsal-fin spine and the lateral line 4 scales, although the amount of lateral line scales is not known, as is the case with vertebrae numbers, colour, and swim bladder morphology. The holotype has a recorded length of 25 cm.

== Distribution and habitat ==
The only specimen known to science was collected on the lower coast of Papua New Guinea, thus restricting the known range to this locality. This location is constant with McKay's hypothesis that the specimen is actually S. analis, which has also been recorded occasionally from lower Papua New Guinea.

Nothing of the biology or contribution to fisheries of the species is currently known.
