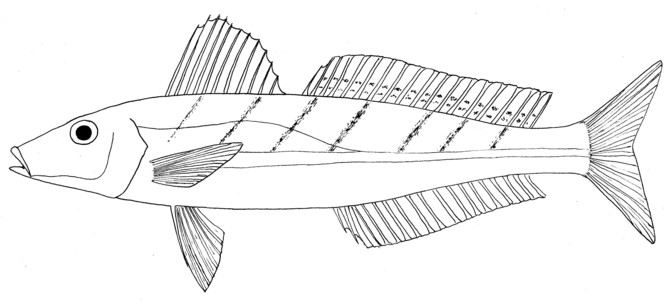

Scientific classification
- Kingdom: Animalia
- Phylum: Chordata
- Class: Actinopterygii
- Order: Acanthuriformes
- Family: Sillaginidae
- Genus: Sillago
- Species: S. bassensis

Binomial name
- Sillago bassensis Cuvier, 1829
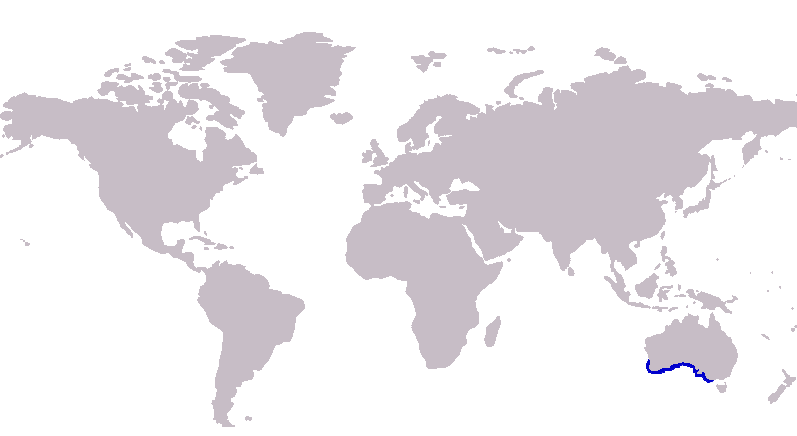
- Range of the southern school whiting

Synonyms
- Sillago bassensis bassensis McKay, 1985

= Southern school whiting =

Species of fish

The southern school whiting (Sillago bassensis),also known as the silver whiting or trawl whiting, is a common species of coastal marine fish of the smelt-whiting family that inhabits the south and south-west coasts of Australia. Its distribution overlaps a number of other common sillaginids, with careful observation of anatomical features occasionally needed to distinguish between species. The southern school whiting is closely related to the eastern school whiting, Sillago flindersi, and initially were thought to be all one species. The species inhabits both shallow inshore sandy waters, as well as deeper offshore waters, with a transition of habitats occurring with increasing age. It is a predatory fish, taking a variety of crustaceans, polychaetes and bivalves as prey. It reaches sexual maturity at three years of age, and spawns multiple times between December and April. The southern school whiting is commonly caught by commercial and recreational fishermen, often while fishing for related species, especially the sought after King George whiting. The species is marketed fresh in southern Australia.

== Taxonomy and naming ==
The southern school whiting is one of over 30 species in the genus Sillago, which is one of five genera belonging to the smelt whiting family Sillaginidae, this family was previously considered to be part of the Percoidea, a suborder of the Perciformes. The 5th edition of Fishes of the World classifies the Sillaginidae in the order Spariformes.

The species was first examined and named Sillago bassensis by Georges Cuvier in 1829 from the holotype specimen collected in Western Port of Victoria, which lies on the Bass Strait. A number of re-examinations of the fish commonly called 'school whiting' during the 1980s confirmed the presence of two possible subspecies, which were termed by McKay Sillago bassensis bassensis and Sillago bassensis flindersi, the Western school whiting and Eastern school whiting respectively. McKay hypothesized the two species diverged during the last ice age which left a land bridge from mainland Australia to Tasmania open during the Pleistocene, effectively isolating two pockets of fish, allowing genetic divergence. These two subspecies are now treated as separate species, despite a relatively young divergence time.

The identification of a further species of school whiting from Western Australia, Sillago vittata, caused the common name 'western school whiting' to be applied to this species, while S. bassensis is now referred to as the 'Southern school whiting', causing some confusion. The species is often termed the 'silver whiting' by recreational fishermen in reference to the bright silvery longitudinal strip on the fish, while the name 'trawl whiting' refers to the fact large quantities are taken in commercial trawls.

== Description ==
The southern school whiting has a very similar profile to other members of the genus Sillago, with a slightly compressed, elongate body tapering toward the terminal mouth. The dorsal fin is moderately arched, while the ventral profile is straight. The species is known to grow to a maximum size of 33 cm and around 0.3 kg weight. The colouration of the species is also very similar to a number of other Sillago species which have an overlapping distribution, and in most circumstances, a more detailed analysis must be done to determine the species.

The fin anatomy is highly useful for identification purposes, with the species having 10 to 12 spines in the first dorsal fin, with one spine and 18 or 19 soft rays on the second dorsal fin. The anal fin has two spines with 18 to 20 soft rays posterior to the spines. Lateral line scales and cheek scales are also distinctive, with southern school whiting possessing 63 to 70 lateral line scales and cheek scales positioned in 3–4 rows, all of which are ctenoid. The amount of vertebrae are also diagnostic, having 33 to 35 in total. The swim bladder has a short, blunt anterior median projection with no posterior projection.

The southern school whiting has a body colour of creamy brown to rusty above, before an abrupt transition to a silvery white below, with a brilliant longitudinal silver band separating the colours. A narrow rusty brown horizontal band is positioned above the silver band, with irregular red-brown oblique blotches and broken stripes positioned on the back and upper sides, much like Sillago maculata. The dorsal fins have rows of rusty brown or red-orange spots, the anal fins are yellow to hyaline in colour, while all other fins are pale cream, white or hyaline in appearance. There is no black blotch at the base of the pectoral fin.

== Distribution and habitat ==
The southern school whiting inhabits the south and south western coastlines of Australia, ranging from Geraldton, Western Australia in the west to Western Port, Victoria in the east of the country. There have been no reports from Tasmania. Older literature often refers to S. bassensis recorded as far north as Moreton Bay, Queensland, but these reports are due to misidentification of S. flindersi, as it was unknown there were two species of school whiting when these reports were made.

The species is predominantly found over sand substrate in variable wave and tidal activity zones, often in protected bays. They often frequent the quiet waters of sand flats, the surf zones of beaches, as well as inhabiting deeper offshore waters to at least 55 m and possibly much deeper where they are taken by commercial trawlers over sand. Juveniles are usually found in a few centimeters of water on calm sand flats, in association with accumulations of detached macrophytes in the surf, but do not enter estuarine waters like many of their closest relatives, although they often occupy the sandflats at the entrances of large estuaries.

== Biology ==
=== Diet ===
The southern school whiting has a diet similar to other whiting species, although the exact composition differs between species inhabiting the same region, allowing competition to be avoided. Crustaceans make up the bulk of the species food, with calanoids, cladocerans and carids the dominant crustaceans eaten. Other small teleosts, polychaetes and bivalves are also common prey. Prey items change over the range of S. bassensis, and also seasonally as different prey becomes available. A transition is also seen from juvenile to adult stages as at less than 50 mm in length, the species prey consists almost entirely of small planktonic prey, such calanoid copepods and cladocerans, whereas that of the largest fish (100–169 mm) is dominated by more benthic prey, such as polychaetes and carid shrimps, echinoderms, as well as teleosts in some cases. This transition in diet occurs as the older, larger fish move to deeper offshore waters where different prey becomes available to the fish. Throughout its life cycle, S. bassensis usually has some dietary overlap with co-occurring sillaginids, however the diet is still varied enough not to have any negative effects.

=== Life cycle ===
Southern school whiting do not usually reach maturity until the end of their third year of life, but those individuals that reach maturity early are significantly longer lived than those that do not reach maturity at the same age. The species often reaches 7 years of age, with a known maximum life span of 10 years.

S. bassensis is known to spawn at three periods during the year, with the period between December and March the most common spawning time, with some individuals also spawning between September and November and in March and April. The presence of oocytes that range widely in size and development, as well as post-ovulatory follicles, suggest that the species is a multiple spawner.

The larvae of the species have a functional mouth and gut by 2.3 mm in length, with pigmented eyes and a gas bladder. By this time, the yolk absorption is complete. The snout of recently hatched larvae is concave, but changes to straight or slightly concave during development, as the mouth retracts from below the center of the eye to the anterior margin of the eye in older fish. The fins develop in sequence from caudal to pectoral, anal, 1st dorsal, 2nd dorsal and finally the pelvic fin. Scales are first visible around the gut and mid lateral line by 16 mm. The larvae of S. bassensis are the least pigmented of the whiting inhabiting southern Australia, with the lower jaw containing the only pigment for a long period of time. Juveniles migrate inshore to their nursery areas in surf zones and tidal flats, where they remain until reaching around 50 mm in length.

As southern school whiting mature, they move from their shallow near shore habitats to deeper offshore waters 20 to 35 m deep and within 20 km of the shore where spawning occurs.

== Relationship to humans ==
Being that the southern school whiting is quite prevalent along the south western coastline of Australia, it is taken in minor quantities by trawlers working deep, sandy waters of this region. Western Australia has the largest fishery for the species, however only 1,275 kg of fish are taken annually, which is small compared to other species. The species is often sold fresh in Australia as school or silver whiting, where it is considered a fine eating fish and fetches good prices at market, although not as high as the related King George whiting. It is also exported to Japan with other species of whiting.

The species is often taken by recreational fishermen, who do not normally target the species, often taking it amongst other deeper water whiting species such as S. robusta and Sillaginodes punctatus. The juveniles are often taken from the shore along beaches of variable wave action while fishing for species such as S. schomburgkii. Southern school whiting are taken on a variety of baits, with their natural prey such as marine worms, molluscs, prawns and sardines often used. Due to their schooling nature, many fish can be caught in a single fishing period, although most authorities ask for excess fish to be returned to the water alive. In Western Australia, southern school whiting and yellowfin whiting have a combined bag limit of 30 per person with no size restrictions, with no regulations applying elsewhere.
