= Banana prawn =

Banana prawn may refer to the following species:

- Fenneropenaeus merguiensis
- Indian prawn
