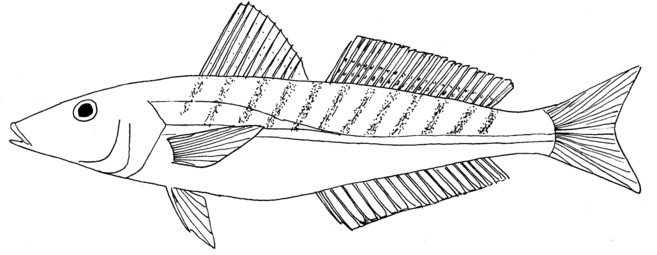

Scientific classification
- Kingdom: Animalia
- Phylum: Chordata
- Class: Actinopterygii
- Order: Acanthuriformes
- Family: Sillaginidae
- Genus: Sillago
- Species: S. flindersi

Binomial name
- Sillago flindersi McKay, 1985
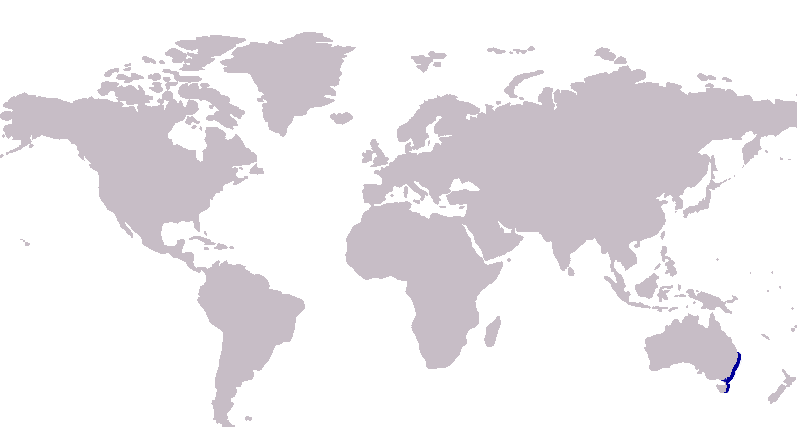
- Range of the Eastern school whiting

Synonyms
- S. bassensis flindersi McKay, 1985

= Eastern school whiting =

Species of fish

The eastern school whiting (Sillago flindersi), also known as the redspot whiting, Bass Strait whiting, Flinders' sillago, silver whiting or spotted whiting, is a species of benthic marine fish of the smelt-whiting family Sillaginidae. The eastern school whiting is endemic to Australia, distributed along the east coast from southern Queensland down to Tasmania and South Australia, where it inhabits sandy substrates from shallow tidal flats to depths of 180 m on the continental shelf. Eastern school whiting prey on various crustaceans and polychaete worms, with the diet varying seasonally and throughout the range of the species. Eastern school whiting reproduce in the deeper waters twice a year, releasing up to 110,000 eggs during a season.

Eastern school whiting are a major commercial species along the eastern coast of Australia, caught by Danish seine vessels in the Bass Strait and as a byproduct of prawn trawling to the north. This forms a large export market to Japan, with over 1400 tonnes per year caught and exported.

== Taxonomy and naming ==
The eastern school whiting is one of over 30 species in the genus Sillago, which is one of five genera belonging to the smelt whiting family Sillaginidae, this family was previously considered to be part of the Percoidea, a suborder of the Perciformes. The 5th edition of Fishes of the World classifies the Sillaginidae in the order Spariformes. The eastern school whiting belongs to the subgenus Parasillago, which is one of three subgenera erected during a comprehensive review of the Sillaginidae in 1985 by McKay.

The Eastern school whiting was long thought to be synonymous with the closely related species Sillago bassensis, the southern school whiting, with this relationship first applied in 1892 by Cohen. It took until 1985 before McKay identified two distinct forms of Sillago bassensis, which he believed to subspecies, thus erecting Sillago bassensis flindersi for the eastern subspecies and Sillago bassensis bassensis for the western subspecies. These subspecies were formally promoted to separate species status in 1992, during a second review of the family by McKay after the two species were found to occur sympatrically in Bass Strait. The binomial name of the species was named in honour of the explorer Captain Matthew Flinders, who circumnavigated and extensively mapped the coastline of Australia.

The various common names of the so-called 'school whitings' is complicated, with the original use of western and eastern school whiting to describe S. bassensis and S. flindersi affected by the naming of a third species of school whiting; Sillago vittata. This has not affected S. flindersi, which is still named the 'eastern school whiting' in recognition that it inhabits the east coast of Australia. The local name of 'red-spot whiting' refers to the diagonal lines of red spots present on the fish's upper side. The rarely used name of 'Bass Strait whiting' refers to oceanic strait between the Victorian and Tasmanian coastlines, where large quantities of the species are taken in trawls.

== Description ==
As with most of the genus Sillago, the eastern school whiting has a slightly compressed, elongate body tapering toward the terminal mouth, with the body covered in small ctenoid scales extending to the cheek and head. The most reliable features for distinguishing the species are the number of fins spines and rays and the shape of the swim bladder. The first dorsal fin has 11 spines and the second dorsal fin has 1 leading spine with 16 to 18 soft rays posterior. The anal fin is similar to the second dorsal fin, but has 2 spines with 18 to 20 soft rays posterior to the spines. Other distinguishing features include 69 to 76 lateral line scales and a total of 32 to 34 vertebrae. The species has a known maximum length of 33 cm.

The swim bladder morphology is nearly identical to that of S. bassensis, shaped by a short, blunt anterior median projection with no posterior projection. Swim bladder morphology is useless for distinguishing between this species and S. bassensis, with the external colour the most reliable method.

The eastern school whiting has a pale sandy colour on top with a silvery white below and an olive brown-pink head with blue and yellow tinges. A series of obliquely positioned rusty brown bars are positioned on the back and upper sides, with a longitudinal row of rusty brown blotches along the mid-lateral silver stripe. There is no dark spot at the base of the hyaline-yellow pectoral fin. The first, spinous dorsal fin is hyaline with a dusting of red spots, while the second dorsal fin is hyaline and each ray having a sprinkling of 4-5 red spots. The ventral and anal fins are also hyaline, with the anal fin having yellow to orange rays with white margins. The coloration is very similar to S. bassensis but differs in that the oblique bars are wider, more regular and without the appearance of effused dots or spots, as well as lacking the mid-lateral blotches.

== Distribution and habitat ==
Due to the similarity between the eastern and southern school whitings, the exact range of this species is not confidently known, with current sources stating that it ranges from southern Queensland south to New South Wales, Victoria, eastern Tasmania and possibly westward to South Australia. Anxious Bay is the westernmost report of the species, although due to the confusion between the two species this is thought to have been a misidentification of S. bassensis, with S. flindersi not considered to inhabit South Australia by most authorities.

Unlike most other species of sillaginids, the eastern school whiting is primarily an offshore species, inhabiting waters on the continental shelf down to depths of 180m, rarely seen in shallower waters. The species is known to inhabit surf zones and to congregate around coastal lakes, particularly during February and March. They prefer clean sandy substrates, rarely occupying silty or seagrass beds and have never been found in estuarine waters. Genetic analysis has shown that migration does not occur in the species, instead they tend to remain in the same area throughout their life cycle.

== Biology ==
=== Diet ===
The average diet of eastern school whiting consists mainly of various crustaceans, principally amphipods, decapods, mysidaceans and copepods. Polychaetes made up a small proportion of the diet, certainly much less than most co occurring sillaginids. Like many fish species, diet varies significantly with fish size, geographical location and season. Fish in the 0–10 cm group consume mainly copepods, while 11–20 cm fish ate mainly shrimp in the genus Callianassa and amphipods. Many of the food items of the species vary in range, as well as seasonal abundance, therefore having an impact on the diets of different groups of fish.

=== Life cycle ===
Both sexes of the eastern school whiting reach sexual maturity at around 170 mm in size and 2 years of age, with males reaching maturity slightly before females. Once at sexual maturity, they move offshore into deeper waters to over 180 m in depth where they remain and spawn. Females produce between 30 000 and 110 000 eggs per season, which occurs between October and January, with two spawning periods identified in populations occurring in Bass Strait. The females of the species are reported to live to 7 years of age and males 6 years, reaching a maximum known size of 33 cm.

== Relationship to humans ==
The eastern school whiting is primarily a target of commercial fishermen operating offshore seines and trawls, with recreational catches generally rare. The exception occurs when large amounts of the species have been taken by anglers as large schools pass through shallow waters along the coast.

Two major fisheries exist for the species, one in Bass Strait, the other in Southern Queensland. The Bass Strait fishery is dominated by Danish seine vessels which take over 90% of the catch. This fishery has expanded markedly in recent years, with catches prior to 1970 less than 270 tonnes per year, having risen to over 1400 tonnes per year in 1993. The Queensland fishery is relatively new, developed after a population of eastern school whiting was found by trawlers. A number of smaller fisheries are due to bycatch of prawn trawlers along the range of the species. The Queensland and smaller fisheries form the basis of a lucrative export market whereby whole frozen fish are shipped to Thailand where they are processed and sent to Japan. This fishery was worth over 2.5 million Australian dollars in 1986.
