= Trumpeter whiting =

Scientific classification
- Kingdom: Animalia
- Phylum: Chordata
- Class: Actinopterygii
- Order: Acanthuriformes
- Family: Sillaginidae
- Genus: Sillago
- Species: S. maculata

Binomial name
- Sillago maculata Quoy & Gaimard, 1824
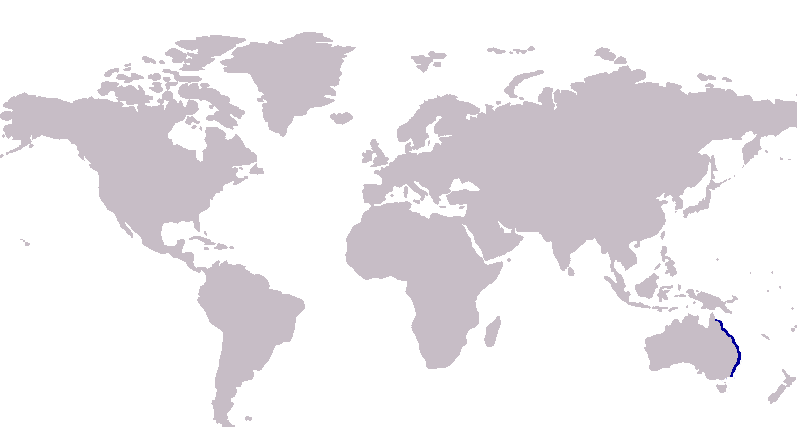
- Range of the trumpeter whiting

Synonyms
- Sillago maculata maculata Quoy & Gaimard, 1824; Sillago gracilis Alleyne and Macleay, 1877

Species of fish

The trumpeter whiting (Sillago maculata), also known as the winter whiting or diver whiting, is a common species of coastal marine fish of the smelt-whiting family, Sillaginidae. The trumpeter whiting is endemic to Australia, inhabiting the eastern seaboard from southern New South Wales to northern Queensland. The species is found in bays, estuaries, coastal lakes and mangrove creeks on silty and muddy substrates in waters ranging from 0 to 30 m deep, occasionally inhabiting sandy and seagrass beds.

The trumpeter whiting is a benthic carnivore, consuming a variety of crustaceans, polychaetes and molluscs, with a dietary shift occurring as they mature and move into deeper waters. The species spawns during summer, with young fish often penetrating into estuaries and seagrass beds.

The species is highly sought after by both recreational and commercial fishermen, with the fish highly regarded as a table food. The trumpeter whiting has two close relatives, the oriental trumpeter whiting and the western trumpeter whiting, which can be easily confused with S. maculata.

== Taxonomy and naming ==
The trumpeter whiting is one of over 30 species in the genus Sillago, which is one of five genera belonging to the smelt whiting family Sillaginidae, this family was previously considered to be part of the Percoidea, a suborder of the Perciformes. The 5th edition of Fishes of the World classifies the Sillaginidae in the order Spariformes.

The species was first described by Jean René Constant Quoy and Joseph Paul Gaimard in 1824 from specimens collected from the waters of Sydney Harbour in New South Wales, Australia. A specimen from this location was also designated to be the holotype. The species was subsequently redescribed under the name of Sillago gracilis by Alleyne and Macleay in 1877, which is a junior synonym and has been discarded under the ICZN rules. Roland McKay, whilst working on a revision of the sillaginids, found there to be three closely related species of 'trumpeter whiting'; the western trumpeter whiting, the oriental trumpeter whiting and the trumpeter whiting which he interpreted to be subspecies. He therefore assigned the trumpeter whiting the name Sillago maculata maculata to clarify its subspecies status, doing similar for the other two species. However, soon after publishing, more specimens came to light which validated giving the three subspecies full species status, and the trumpeter whiting once again returned to the binomial Sillago maculata.

The common name of the species, trumpeter whiting, refers to the grunting sound the fish makes when first taken from the water, with a number of other species of unrelated fish also known to do this. The names 'winter' and 'diver' whiting are in reference to the high catches made in winter by amateur fishermen and the depth at which larger individuals of the species inhabit respectively.

== Description ==
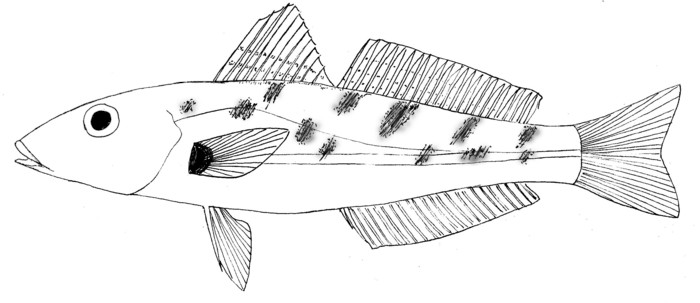

As with most of the genus Sillago, the trumpeter whiting has a slightly compressed, elongate body tapering toward the terminal mouth. The body is covered in small ctenoid scales, including the two rows of cheek scales. The first dorsal fin has 11 spines and the second dorsal fin has 1 leading spine with 19 to 20 soft rays posterior. The anal fin is similar to the second dorsal fin, but has 2 spines with 19 to 21 soft rays posterior to the spines. Other distinguishing features include 71 to 75 lateral line scales and a total of 34 to 36 vertebrae. The species has a known maximum length of 30 cm and a maximum recorded weight of 216 grams.

The swimbladder has a short anterior median extension and two anterolateral extensions present, with a complex network of tubular canals that rejoin the swimbladder at four locations anteriorally. Lateral extensions reach to the duct like process present on the ventral surface of the swimbladder.

The body is a sandy brown to olive green colour above, while the sides and lower body are a silvery brown to cream-white hue. The head is dark olive brown to greenish above, while the cheeks and opercles are golden-green, with a dark blotch on the opercle of some individuals. The trumpeter whiting is usually easy to distinguish by its characteristic dark brown irregular blotches present on the side of the fish, as well as a golden silver longitudinal band. The spinous dorsal fin is whitish, with a mottled olive green and brown texture. The soft dorsal fin has about five rows of brownish green spots. The anal and ventral fins are golden to yellow with cream margins, while the pectoral fins are yellow to pale yellow-green, with a distinct black-blue spot at the base. The caudal fin is olive brown to a darkish green-brown with darker margins.

== Distribution and habitat ==
The trumpeter whiting is endemic to Australia, inhabiting the eastern seaboard from Narooma in New South Wales up to Lizard Island in Queensland. Fossil otoliths found in New Zealand indicate the trumpeter whiting or one of its closely related species was present in New Zealand until sometime in the late Pleistocene.

The species prefers silty and muddy substrates in the deeper water of bays, but also inhabits deep sandy areas, with a study by Burchmore et al. suggesting a seasonal move between these two substrates in Botany Bay, New South Wales. They are frequently found in the mouths of rivers, estuaries, coastal lakes and mangrove creeks. It is known from a depth range of 0 to 50 m. The juveniles are most abundant in estuaries and shallow water during the summer months, where they occupy sand and seagrass beds before moving into deeper water as they mature.

== Biology ==
=== Diet ===
Trumpeter whiting are benthic carnivores during their adult life, and like other sillaginids undergo a change in diet as they grow older. Juveniles are often considered to not be benthic, as they feed on a variety of planktonic prey, with mysids, amphipods and rarely polychaetes the main prey. They also prey on a variety of meiobenthos, with copepods the predominant form taken. Once they reach over 10 cm in size, they move into deeper water where they prey predominantly on polychaetes, bivalves, ophiuroidea and brachyura.

Studies have also shown there is variation in the diet depending on geographical location and to a lesser extent, season.

=== Life cycle ===
Trumpeter whiting reach sexual maturity at a length of 19 cm in both sexes, having an extended period of reproductive development from October to April. Reproductive development of males and females was synchronized, with a peak in February and high levels of maturation in December. Running-ripe fish are present every month except June, but are most abundant in December and February.

The species spawns on sandy beaches in sheltered bays, lakes and estuaries in relatively shallow water. Juveniles remain in these shallow water environments from 1–3 m depth, often penetrating into the upper reaches of estuaries. The juveniles have been observed to occupy small burrows on shallow sand flats, sitting at the entrance and retreating into the burrow as danger approaches. Whether they excavate these burrows themselves or hijack them from other organisms is unknown.

== Relationship to humans ==
Trumpeter whiting are considered to be good quality fish for consumption, having softer flesh than most other Australian species of sillaginid. The species is commonly targeted by both commercial and recreational fishermen. Large amounts of the species are taken by prawn trawlers and seine netters in bays, with catches in Moreton Bay alone exceeding 200 tonnes per year, and the catch much higher for the entire fishery. The fish are marketed fresh, with trawled fish being bruised and don't fetch as high a price as netted fish.

Recreational fishermen take large quantities of the species during winter predominantly, although they are present year round in most areas. Large catches are possible, with rigs kept as light as possible to avoid spooking the fish. Simple running sinker rigs using a size 6 - 2 hook, on 2 – 3 kg lines are commonly used, occasionally with red tubing employed as an attractant. Bait consists of the species natural prey such as prawns or bass yabbies, bivalves, a variety of marine worms, as well as bait such as squid. There are currently bag limits in Queensland of 50 winter whiting per person.
