= Wacky rig =

The wacky rig is a skill technique used for fishing with a soft plastic lure, such as the Gary Yamamoto 'Senko'. Notable for its unique action even among soft lures, wacky style is used to heighten the chance at catching finicky fish on harsh days, although at the expense of lowering the chances of very large fish, because the size of the bait is very small, allowing bass of all sizes to take the bait. Unlike the Texas rig and Carolina rig, both sides of the wacky rig flutter, creating a more natural action. The name comes from its unusual style of attaching a plastic worm through the middle of the body instead of on one end.

== Set up ==
The wacky rig is considered a simple but effective way to fish. Worms between four and six inches are generally used, but some use creature baits resembling crayfish and small fishes. Stick worms, those that have the same diameter throughout the length and a straight tail, are the most used, although tapered worms and tailed worms can be used. Stick worms are heavier, giving a more erratic action on the dive. Almost any hook can be used, as long as it's generally smaller than hooks used for Texas rig and Carolina rig, as large hooks may scare away potential bites from smaller fish. The hook is inserted through the middle of the plastic, leaving the end of the hook exposed. A thinner line than usual, from six to ten pound test, is used. Both monofilament fishing line and fluorocarbon may be used. These tackle heighten the chances of a bite. The two kinds of weights used are nail weights and ring weights. Nail weights are inserted through the head of the worm for different action and deeper fishing. With a nail as a weight, the lure will have an irregular action while gliding to the bottom. Ring weights are also used to fish at deeper depths, and they have the advantage of inserting the hook both through the worm and the ring simultaneously. Although fishing companies produce nail weights specifically for wacky rigging, one may use nails commonly found in tool boxes to save money. The weights allow for fishing at deeper depths, from ten up to forty feet. Any rods in general may be used. Longer rods allow for longer casts, but shorter rods give accuracy to the cast. Some anglers even use braid with a fluorocarbon leader.

== Usage and technique ==
The wacky rig can be used all year round, but is not considered to be as effective during winter months due to the sluggish nature of basses, although large winter bass have been caught using it. Clearer waters are generally thought to be better conditions for wacky styling than stained and murky waters. The lure can be used anywhere, from cover to vegetation to open waters to skipping under docks.

One would cast the rig out into targeted areas where bass may be, enticing a reaction bite. While letting the 'Senko' bait fall on slack line, one may also lift the rod to give the worm a moving look and keep it above ground longer. If left for up to a minute and still no bite, one should shake the line to give the appearance of a moving organism, or lift up the rod and let the lure fall to the ground again.

== See also ==
- Texas Rig
- Carolina Rig
