= Dropshotting =

Finesse fishing technique

Drop shotting is a highly finesse angling technique using plastic baits, consisting of a small thin-wire hook with a weight (sinker) attached to the tag end of the line. This is in contrast to the more traditional Texas Rig, where the weight slides inline, resting on the nose of the bait; or the Carolina Rig, where the weight is fixed above the bait. The dropshot rig provides the ability to keep a hook and lure off the bottom with a more "weightless"-looking posture. Usually the bait is fished by letting the weight hit the bottom and then twitch the rod tip, causing the lure to shake in a jumping-like action, but can also be flipped, dragged, hopped or jigged along the bottom. This simple but versatile technique has endless combinations with the different hooks, soft plastics and weights that can be used.^{[1]} The aim is to present a free floating, slow twitching lure to induce a strike from non-aggressive fish. This rig is commonly used in bass fishing for catching smallmouth, largemouth and spotted bass, but can be used for a variety of other bottom-dwelling fish species, as well.

== How to fish ==
The Drop Shot Rig can be used in any place that looks like it could hold a bass. Similar to jig fishing the weight will need to hit the bottom, and fished along the bottom by twitching the rod. Another commonly used application of this rig is on deep suspended fish. The rig can be dropped down onto a school of fish directly under the boat. Because the bait is above the weight it is held up off the bottom, it makes for an easier target for fish that are suspended. Usually when throwing the bait the user will want to target harder bottoms having rock or gravel. Another place the drop shot rig is thrown, is in and around brush found on the bottom either man made or natural. The drop shot rig can even be fished from shore. Casting out away from the bank and letting the rig fall til it hits bottom or the line goes slack. Once the lure is on the bottom reel the line till it is taut and shake the rig in place.

Due to the drop shot rig being a finesse rig the gear used when fishing the drop shot rig is spinning gear and light line. The line usually consist of 8-10 lb fluorocarbon or mono-filament. The hook used is usually a light wire octopus or round bend style hook. The weights are usually pretty light, and some have a swivel to prevent line twist. Some weights have a wire attached to the swivel that is used to pinch the line. The snap also makes it efficient for getting the lure free from a snag, because the line can be pulled through the snap retrieving the lure.

One of the more commonly used knots when using the dropshotting technique is the palomar knot. The tag end of the knot is then placed through the eye of the hook to keep the hook out at a ninety degree angle. Once the tag line is put through the eye of the hook the weight is applied at the desired length from the lure and is ready to be fished. The common hookset used when drop shotting is a reel set. This is where the fishermen feels the bite and starts reeling while lifting the rod. Causing the thin wire hook to slide up into the top of the fish's mouth. This hook set is commonly used with the drop shot due to the thin wire hook. If the hook is set too hard then it could cause the hook to bend and lose the fish. Another important reason for this hookset is to keep from breaking the light line usually associated with this form of fishing.
