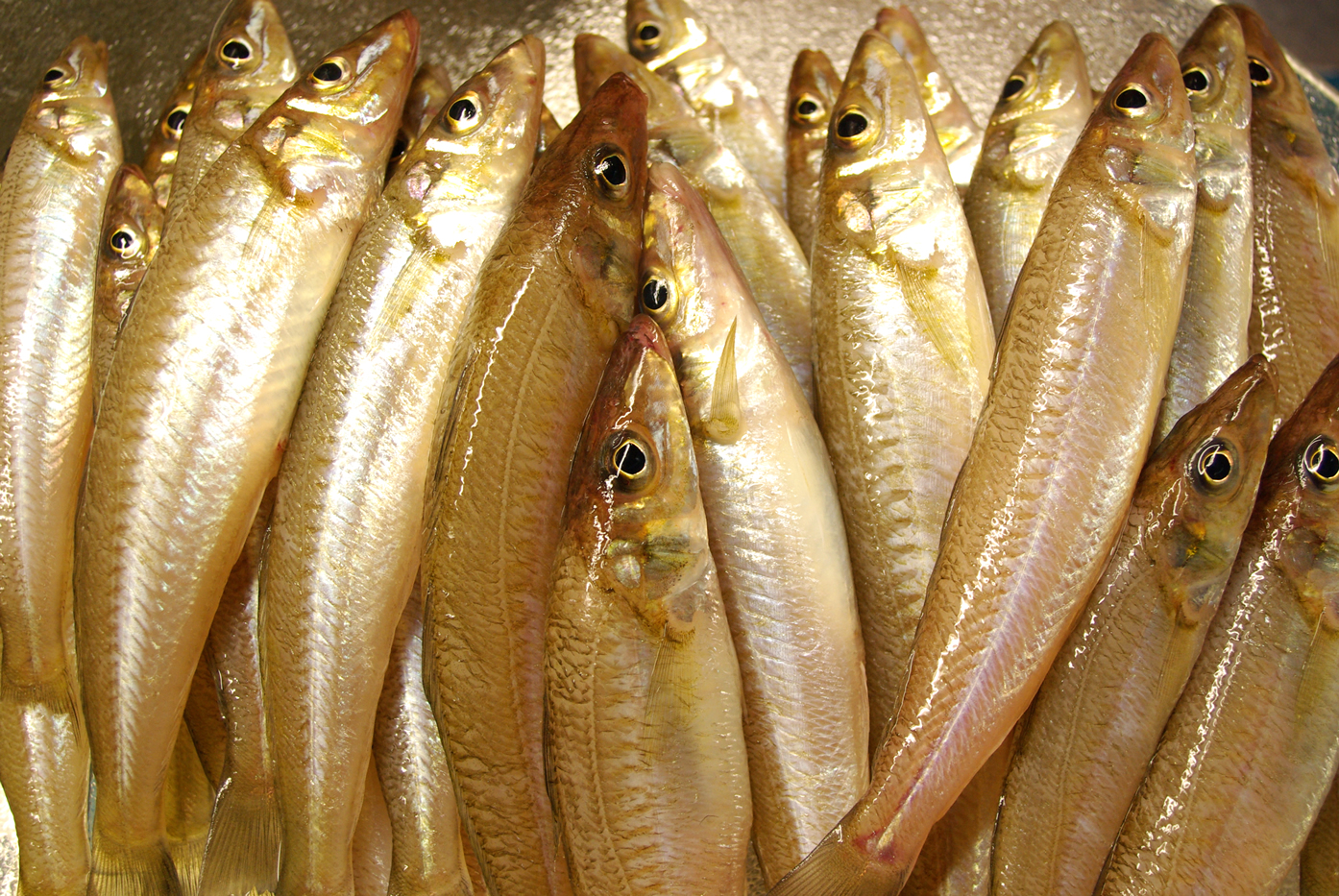
- Sillago japonica

Scientific classification
- Kingdom: Animalia
- Phylum: Chordata
- Class: Actinopterygii
- Division: Teleostei
- Order: Acanthuriformes
- Family: Sillaginidae; Richardson, 1846

Type genus
- Sillago Cuvier, 1817

Genera
- Sillaginodes; Sillaginopodys; Sillaginops; Sillaginopsis; Sillago

= Sillaginidae =

Sillaginidae Temporal range: Eocene to Recent 55–0 Ma

Family of fishes

The Sillaginidae, commonly known as the smelt-whitings, whitings, sillaginids, sand borers and sand-smelts, are a family of benthic coastal marine fish historically classified in the order Perciformes, although the 5th edition of Fishes of the World places the family in the Spariformes. The smelt-whitings inhabit a wide region covering much of the Indo-Pacific, from the west coast of Africa east to Japan and south to Australia. The family comprises only five genera and 35 species, of which a number are dubious, with the last major revision of the family in 1992 unable to confirm the validity of a number of species. They are elongated, slightly compressed fish, often light brown to silver in colour, with a variety of markings and patterns on their upper bodies. The Sillaginidae are not related to a number of fishes commonly called 'whiting' in the Northern Hemisphere, including the fish originally called whiting, Merlangius merlangus.

The smelt-whitings are mostly inshore fishes that inhabit sandy, silty, and muddy substrates on both low- and high-energy environments ranging from protected tidal flats and estuaries to surf zones. A few species predominantly live offshore on deep sand shoals and reefs, although the larvae and juvenile phases of most species return to inshore grounds, where they spend the first few years of their lives. Smelt-whitings are benthic carnivores that prey predominantly on polychaetes, a variety of crustaceans, molluscs, and to a lesser extent echinoderms and fish, feeding by detecting vibrations emitted by their prey.

The family is highly important to fisheries throughout the Indo-Pacific, with species such as the northern whiting, Japanese whiting, and King George whiting forming the basis of major fisheries throughout their range. Many species are also of major importance to small subsistence fisheries, while others are little more than occasional bycatch. Smelt-whitings are caught by a number of methods, including trawling, seine nets, and cast nets. In Australia and Japan in particular, members of the family are often highly sought by recreational fishermen who also seek the fish for their prized flesh.

== Taxonomy ==
Roland McKay's 1992 Synopsis of the Sillaginidae

The first species of sillaginid to be scientifically described was Sillago sihama, by Peter Forsskål in 1775, who initially referred the species to a genus of hardyhead, Atherina. It was not until 1817 that the type genus Sillago was created by Georges Cuvier based on his newly described species Sillago acuta, which was later found to be a junior synonym of S. sihama and subsequently discarded. Cuvier continued to describe species of sillaginid with the publishing of his ichthyological work Histoire Naturelle des Poissons with Achille Valenciennes in 1829, also erecting the genus Sillaginodes in this work. The species Cheilodipterus panijus was named in 1822 by Francis Buchanan-Hamilton and was subsequently reexamined by Theodore Gill in 1861, leading to the creation of the monotypic genus Sillaginopsis. John Richardson was the first to propose that Sillago, the only genus of sillaginid then recognised, be assigned to their own taxonomic family, "Sillaginidae" (used interchangeably with 'Sillaginoidae'), at a meeting of the British Association for the Advancement of Science. There were, however, many differing opinions on the relationships of the "sillaginoids", leading to the naturalists of the day continually revising the position of the five genera, placing in them in a number of families. The first review of the sillaginid fishes was Gill's 1861 work "Synopsis of the sillaginoids", in which the name "Sillaginidae" was popularized and expanded on to include Sillaginodes and Sillaginopsis, however the debate on the placement of the family remained controversial.

In the years after Gill's paper was published, over 30 'new' species of sillaginids were reported and scientifically described, many of which were synonyms of previously described species, with similarity between species, as well as minor geographical variation confounding taxonomists. In 1985, Roland McKay of the Queensland Museum published a comprehensive review of the family to resolve these relationships, although a number of species are still listed as doubtful, with McKay unable to locate the holotypes. Along with the review of previously described species, McKay described an additional seven species, a number of which he described as subspecies. After this 1985 paper, additional specimens came to light, proving that all the subspecies he had identified were individual species. In 1992, McKay published a synopsis of the Sillaginidae for the FAO, in which he elevated these subspecies to full species status.

The name "Sillaginidae" was derived from Cuvier's Sillago, which itself takes its name from a locality in Australia, possibly Sillago reef off the coast of Queensland. The term "sillago" is derived from the Greek term syllego, which means "to meet".

=== Classification ===
The following is a comprehensive list of the 35 known extant species of sillaginids, with a number of the species still in doubt due to the loss of the holotype specimen. This classification follows Fishbase, which itself is based on McKay's last revision of the family.

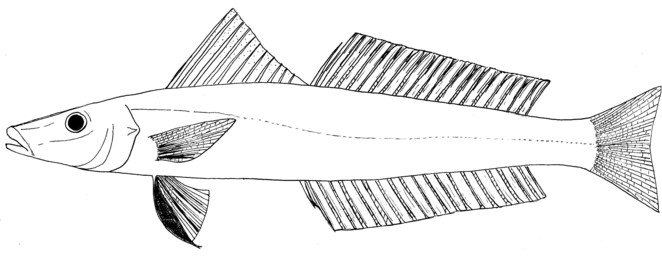
Sillaginopodys chondropus

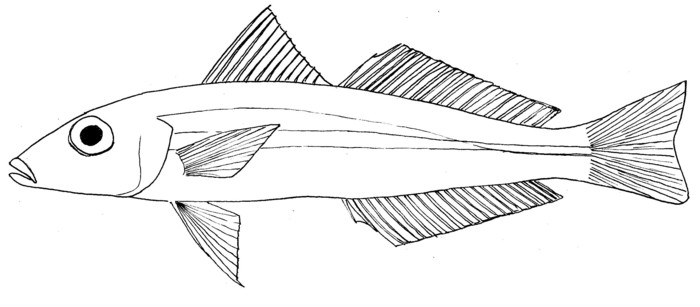
Sillaginops macrolepis

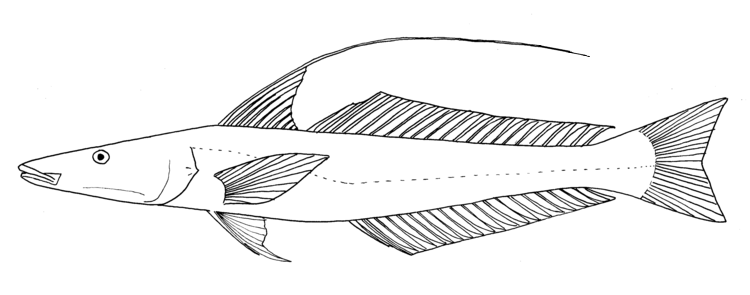
Sillaginopsis panijus

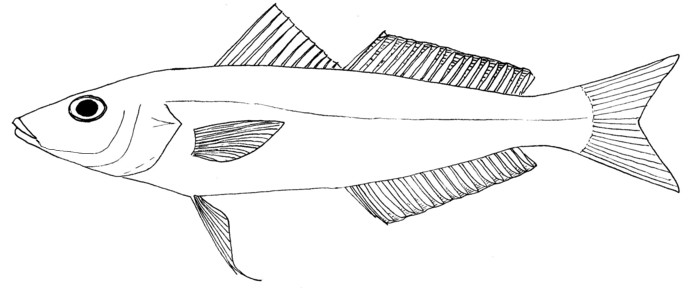
Sillago ingenuua

- Family SILLAGINIDAE
  - Genus Sillaginodes T.N. Gill, 1861
    - Sillaginodes punctatus (Cuvier, 1829) (King George whiting)
  - Genus Sillaginopodys Fowler, 1933
    - Sillaginopodys chondropus (Bleeker, 1849) (Club-foot whiting)
  - Genus Sillaginops Kaga, 2013
    - Sillaginops macrolepis (Bleeker, 1858) (Large-scale whiting)
  - Genus Sillaginopsis
    - Sillaginopsis panijus (Hamilton, 1822) (Gangetic whiting)
  - Genus Sillago (Cuvier, 1816)
    - Sillago aeolus D. S. Jordan & Evermann, 1902 (Oriental sillago)
    - Sillago analis Whitley, 1943 (Golden-lined sillago)
    - Sillago arabica McKay & McCarthy, 1989 (Arabian sillago)
    - Sillago argentifasciata C. Martin & H. R. Montalban, 1935 (Silver-banded sillago)
    - Sillago asiatica McKay, 1982 (Asian sillago)
    - Sillago attenuata McKay, 1985 (Slender sillago)
    - Sillago bassensis G. Cuvier, 1829 (Western school sillago)
    - Sillago boutani Pellegrin, 1905 (Boutan's sillago)
    - Sillago burrus Richardson, 1842 (Western trumpeter sillago)
    - Sillago caudicula Kaga, Imamura, Nakaya, 2010
    - Sillago ciliata G. Cuvier, 1829 (Sand sillago)
    - Sillago erythraea G. Cuvier, 1829
    - Sillago flindersi McKay, 1985 (Flinders' sillago)
    - Sillago indica McKay, Dutt & Sujatha, 1985 (Indian sillago)
    - Sillago ingenuua McKay, 1985 (Bay sillago)
    - Sillago intermedius Wongratana, 1977 (Intermediate sillago)
    - Sillago japonica Temminck & Schlegel, 1843 (Japanese sillago)
    - Sillago lutea McKay, 1985 (Mud sillago)
    - Sillago maculata Quoy & Gaimard, 1824 (Trumpeter sillago)
    - Sillago megacephalus S. Y. Lin, 1933 (Large-headed sillago)
    - Sillago microps McKay, 1985 (Small-eyed sillago)
    - Sillago muktijoddhai Gao & Saha, 2022
    - Sillago nierstraszi Hardenberg, 1941 (Rough sillago)
    - Sillago nigrofasciata J. G. Xiao, Zheng-Sen Yu, Na Song & T. X. Gao, 2021
    - Sillago parvisquamis T. N. Gill] 1861 (Small-scale sillago)
    - Sillago robusta Stead, 1908 (Stout sillago)
    - Sillago schomburgkii W. K. H. Peters, 1864 (Yellowfin sillago)
    - Sillago sihama Forsskål, 1775 (Silver sillago)
    - Sillago sinica T. X. Gao, D. P. Ji, Y. S. Xiao, T. Q. Xue, Yanagimoto & Setoguma, 2011 (Chinese sillago)
    - Sillago soringa Dutt & Sujatha, 1982 (Soringa sillago)
    - Sillago suezensis Golani, R. Fricke & Tikochinski, 2013
    - Sillago vincenti McKay, 1980 (Vincent's sillago)
    - Sillago vittata McKay, 1985 (Banded sillago)

== Evolution ==
A number of sillaginids have been identified from the fossil record, with the lower Eocene marking the first appearance of the family. The family is thought to have evolved in the Tethys Sea of central Australia, before colonizing southern Australia during the upper Eocene after a seaway broke through south of Tasmania. During the Oligocene, the family spread to the north and south, occupying a much more extensive range than their current Indo-Pacific distribution. Fossils suggest the sillaginids ranged as far north as Poland and Germany, and as far south as New Zealand, found in shallow water sedimentary deposits along with other species of extant genera.

At least eight fossil sillaginid species have been found, all of which are believed to be of the genus Sillago based on the only remains found, otoliths. Only one species of extant sillaginid, Sillago maculata, has been found in the fossil record, and this was in very recent Pleistocene sediments.

- Sillago campbellensis (Schwarzhans, 1985) Australia, Miocene
- Sillago hassovicus (Koken, 1891) Poland, Middle Miocene
- Sillago maculata (Quoy and Gaimard, 1824) New Zealand, Middle Pleistocene
- Sillago mckayi (Schwarzhans, 1985) Australia, Oligocene
- Sillago pliocaenica (Stinton, 1952) Australia, Pliocene
- Sillago recta (Schwarzhans, 1980) New Zealand, Upper Miocene
- Sillago schwarzhansi (Steurbaut, 1984) France, Lower Miocene
- Sillago ventriosus (Steurbaut, 1984) France, Upper Oligocene

== Phylogeny ==
- Sillaginidae
  - Sillago
    - Sillago
    - Parasillago
    - Sillaginopodys
  - Sillaginodes
  - Sillaginopsis

Phylogeny of the Sillaginidae, illustrating the three subgenera of Sillago proposed by McKay.

The relationships of the Sillaginidae are poorly known, with very similar morphological characteristics and a lack of genetic studies restricting the ability to perform cladistic analyses on the family. Being the fossil sillaginids are based on the comparison of fossil otoliths, with no other type of remains found thus far, this also prevents the reconstruction of the evolution of the family through fossil species. While the position of the Sillaginidae in the order Perciformes was thought to be firmly established due to a number of synapomorphies shared with other members of that order, no sister group has been established for the family. The 5th edition of Fishes of the World placed Sillaginidae in the order Spariformes but other workers have classified the family as incertae sedis within the series Eupercaria. The current taxonomic status of the family is thought to represent a basic picture of the group's phylogeny, with McKay further dividing the genus Sillago into three subgenera based on shared morphological characters of the swimbladder. The genera Sillaginodes and Sillaginopsis have the most plesiomorphic characteristics; being monotypic, and distinct from Sillago. Sillago is further divided into three subgenera based primarily on swim bladder morphology; Sillago, Parasillago and Sillaginopodys, which also represent evolutionary relationships. Whilst genetic studies have not been done on the family, they have been used to establish the relationship of what were thought to be various subspecies of school whiting, S. bassensis and S. flindersi. Furthermore, morphological data suggests a number of Australian species diverged very recently during the last glacial maximum, which caused land bridges to isolate populations of fish. The two aforementioned species of school whiting, S. maculata and S. burrus, and S. ciliata and S. analis are all thought to be products of such a process, although only the school whiting have anything other than similar morphology as evidence of this process.

== Morphology ==
The Sillaginidae are medium-sized fishes which grow to an average of around 20 cm and around 100 g, although the largest member of the family, the King George whiting is known to reach 72 cm and 4.8 kg in weight. The body shape and fin placement of the family is quite similar to most of the members of the order Perciformes. Their bodies are elongate, slightly compressed, with a head that tapers toward a terminal mouth. The mouth has a band of brush-like teeth with canine teeth present only in the upper jaw of Sillaginopsis. The cranial sensory system of the family is well developed above and laterally, with the lower jaw having a pair of small pores behind which is a median pit containing a pore on each side. On each side of the elongate head the operculum has a short sharp spine. They have two true dorsal fins; the anterior one supported by 10 to 13 spines while the long rear one is held up by a single leading spine followed by 16 to 27 soft rays. The anal fin is similar to the second dorsal fin, having two small slender spines followed by 14 to 26 soft rays. Their bodies are covered in ctenoid scales, with the exception of the cheek which may have cycloid or ctenoid scales. There is a wide variation in the amount of lateral line scales, ranging from 50 to 141. The swimbladder in the Sillaginidae is either absent, poorly developed, or highly complex with anterior and lateral extensions that project well into the caudal region. A unique duct-like process is present from the ventral surface of the swimbladder to just before the urogenital opening in most species. The presence and morphology of each species' swim bladder is often their major diagnostic feature, with McKay's three proposed subgenera based on swimbladder morphology alone. The sillaginids have only a small range of body colourings and frequently the only colour characteristics to identify between species are the arrangements of spots and bars on their upper bodies. Most of the family are a pale brown – creamy white colour, while a few species are silver all over. The undersides of the fish are usually lighter than the upper side, and the fins range from yellow to transparent, often marked by bars and spots.

== Distribution and habitat ==
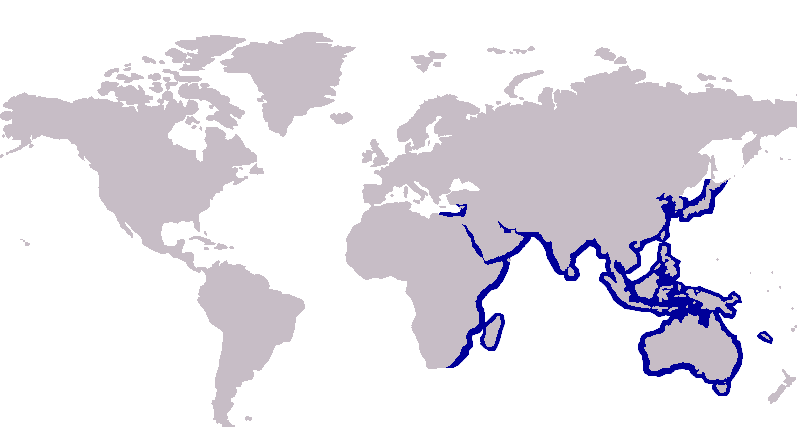
The current geographical distribution of the family Sillaginidae

The Sillaginidae are distributed throughout the Indo-Pacific region, ranging from the west coast of Africa to Japan and Taiwan in the east, as well occupying as a number of small islands including New Caledonia in the Pacific Ocean. While they have a fairly wide distribution, the highest species densities occur along the coasts of India, China, Taiwan, South East Asia, the Indonesian Archipelago and northern Australia. One species of sillaginid, Sillago sihama, has been declared an invasive species to the Mediterranean, passing through the Suez Canal from the Red Sea since 1977 as part of the Lessepsian migration, becoming widespread.

Sillaginids are primarily inshore marine fishes inhabiting stretches of coastal waters, although a few species move offshore in their adult stages to deep sand banks or reefs to a maximum known depth of 180 m. All species primarily occupy sandy, silty or muddy substrates, often using seagrass or reef as cover. They commonly inhabit tidal flats, beach zones, broken bottoms and large areas of uniform substrate. Although the family is marine, many species inhabit estuarine environments, with some such as Sillaginopsis panijus also found in the upper reaches of the estuary. Each species often occupies a specific niche to avoid competition with co-occurring sillaginids, often inhabiting a specific substrate type, depth, or making use of surf zones and estuaries. The juveniles often show distinct changes in habitat preference as they mature, often moving to deeper waters. No members of the family are known to undergo migratory movements, and have been shown to be relatively weak swimmers, relying on currents to disperse juveniles.

== Biology ==
=== Diet and feeding ===
The smelt-whitings are benthic carnivores, with all of the species whose diets have been studied showing similar prey preferences. Smelt-whitings have well-developed chemosensory systems compared to many other teleost fishes, with high taste bud densities on the outside tip of the snout. The turbulence and turbidity of the environment appear to determine how well developed the sensory systems are in an individual. Studies from the waters of Thailand, Philippines and Australia have shown that polychaetes, a variety of crustaceans, molluscs and to a lesser extent echinoderms and fish are the predominant prey items of the family. Commonly taken crustaceans include decapods, copepods and isopods, while the predominant molluscs taken are various species of bivalves, especially the unprotected siphon filters that protrude from the shells. In all species studied, some form of diet shift occurs as the fishes mature, often associated with a movement to deeper waters and thus to new potential prey. The juveniles often prey on planktonic prey, with small copepods, isopods and other small crustaceans often taken. Whilst many species have a change in niche to reduce intraspecific competition, there are often many species of sillaginid inhabiting a geographical area. Where this occurs, there is often definite diet differences between species, often associated with a niche specialization. The sillaginid's distinctive body shape and mouth placement is an adaptation to bottom feeding, which is the predominant method of feeding for all whiting species. All larger whiting feed by using their protrusile jaws and tube-like mouths to suck up various types of prey from in, on or above the ocean substrate, as well as using their nose as a 'plough' to dig through the substrate. There is a large body of evidence that shows whiting do not rely on visual cues when feeding, instead using a system based on the vibrations emitted by their prey.

=== Predators ===
Smelt-whitings are a major link in the food chain of most systems, and frequently fall prey to a variety of aquatic and aerial predators. Their main aquatic predators are a wide variety of larger fish, including both teleosts and a variety of sharks and rays. Marine mammals including seals and dolphins have been reported to have taken sillaginids as a main food source. Seabirds are also another major predator of the family, with diving species such as Cormorants taking older fish in deeper waters while juvenile fish in shallow water fall prey to wading birds. Sillaginids are often called 'sandborers' due to their habit of burying themselves in the substrate to avoid predators, much in the same way as they forage, by ploughing their nose into the substrate. This defense is even used against human fishermen, who frequently wade barefoot to feel for buried fish. The Sillaginidae are also host to a variety of well studied internal and external parasites, which are represented prominently by the groups Digenea, Monogenea and Myxosporea, Copepoda and Nematoda.

=== Reproduction ===
The Sillaginidae are an oviparous, non guarding family, whose species tend to show similar reproductive patterns to one another. Each species reaches sexual maturity at a slightly different age, with each sex often showing a disparity in time of maturation. Each species also spawns over a different season and the spawning season often differs within a species, usually as a function of latitude; a feature not unique to sillaginids. The proximity to shore of spawning is also different between species, as each species usually does not migrate inshore to spawn, even if the juveniles require shallow water for protection, instead relying on currents. The fecundity of sillaginids is variable, with a normal range between 50 000 – 100 000. The eggs are small (0.6 to 0.8 mm), spherical and pelagic, hatching around 20 days after fertilisation. The larvae are quite similar, requiring a trained developmental biologist to identify between species. The larvae and juveniles are at the mercy of the ocean currents, being too weaker swimmers to actively seek out coastlines. Currents are thought to have been responsible for the distribution of mainland species to offshore islands as well as the current widespread distribution of Sillago sihama. In all studied species, juveniles inhabit shallow waters in protected embayments, estuaries, tidal creeks and lagoons as well as exposed surf zones, usually over tidal flats and seagrass beds. As the fish mature, they generally move to deeper waters, showing a change in diet.

== Relationship to humans ==
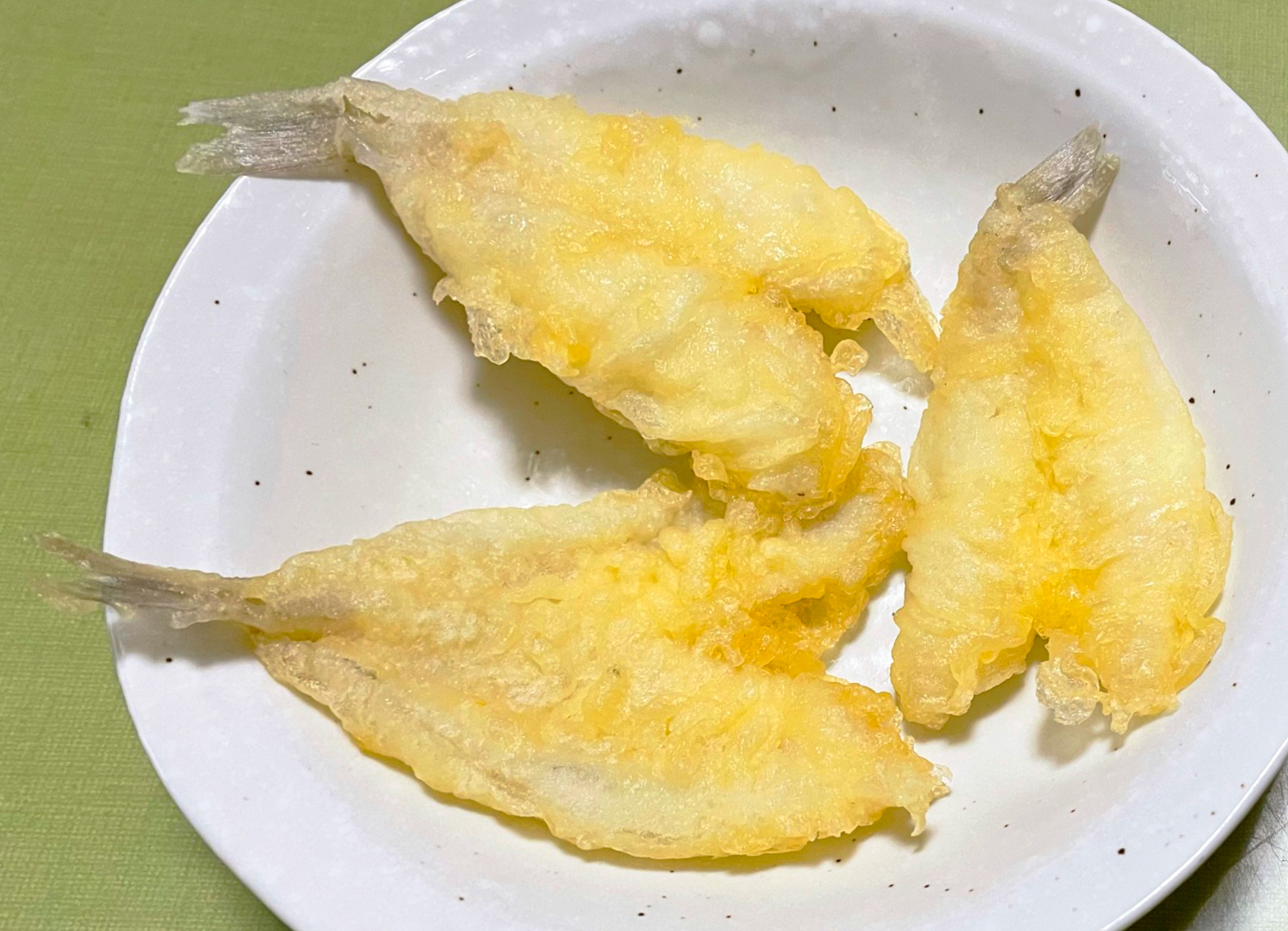
Sillaginidae tempura

The sillaginids are some of the most important commercial fishes in the Indo-Pacific region, with a few species making up the bulk of whiting catches. Their high numbers, coupled with their highly regarded flesh are the reason for this, and their inshore nature also has made them popular targets for recreational fishermen in a number of countries. With overfishing rife in some areas, sustainable aquaculture has allowed the commercial farming of a number of sillaginid species, as well as the use of farmed fish to restock depleted estuaries. At least one species, the Gangetic whiting, has occasionally been used in brackish water aquaria.

=== Commercial fisheries ===
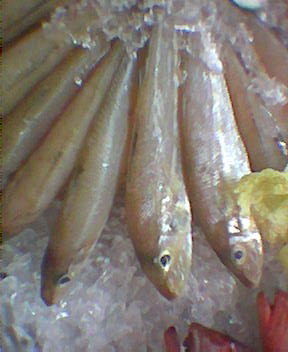
A species of sillaginid for sale as "asuhos" in the Philippines

A small number of sillaginids have large enough populations to allow an entire fishery to be based around them, with King George whiting, northern whiting, Japanese whiting, sand whiting, and school whiting the major species. There have been no reliable estimates of catches for the entire family, as catch statistics generally include only those species taken in large numbers, but there are some species which make up significant numbers of the bycatch. To add to this problem, many of the lesser known species are taken by subsistence fisheries and not reported. From estimates by the FAO, however, it is evident that the family is one of the most important in the Indo-Pacific region, having an estimated catch of 22 718 tonnes in 1990 alone. In this same report, it was shown that the greatest three utilizers of sillaginids were the Philippines, Western Australia and Thailand respectively. The records also suggested that the catch increased from 1983 when it was 17 570 t, up to the last estimate in 1990 of 22 718 t. No such estimates have been carried out since. Modern records for Australia show that this trend has reversed, with all catches from Australia totaling 4 372 t in 2006 compared with 1990's 6000 t haul. Statistics from other countries are unavailable for such comparison.

Sillaginids are taken by a variety of fishing methods, with inshore catches predominantly taken using beach seine nets and cast nets. Due to the alert nature of sillaginids, skill is required on creeping up quietly enough to be able to net fish with a cast net, with experienced fishers often paddling into the sun toward a school and drifting slowly upon it before casting the net. In deeper waters, commercial trawlers and longliners take the most fish, with a number of sillaginids taken in prawn trawls as bycatch. The fish are normally marketed fresh locally under various names, with "Ashuos" commonly used in many countries for various sillaginids. At least one export fishery exists in Australia whereby S. flindersi is exported to Thailand where the fish are repackaged and sent to Japan frozen.

=== Recreational fisheries ===
In Australia and Japan, members of the family are highly sought after by anglers for their sporting and eating qualities, with anglers often taking more than commercial fishermen in some areas. The fishing techniques for all sillaginids are quite similar, with the shallow habitats often requiring light line and quiet movements. Whiting are also popular in part due to their accessibility, with tidal flats around beaches, estuaries and jetties common habitats from where many whiting species are caught without need for a boat. Tidal movements also affect catches, as do lunar phases, causing whiting to 'bite' when the tide is changing. Tackle used is kept light to avoid spooking the fish, and often requires only a simple setup, with a hook and light sinker tied directly to the mainline usually effective. In deeper water fished from boats or where currents are strong, more complex rigs are used, often with hooks tied to dropper loops on the trace. in Australia, some specialist whiting fishermen who target the fish in the surf or on shallow banks use red beads or tubing to attract the fish, claiming the method produces more fish. The bait used is normally anything from the surrounding environment which the whiting naturally prey on, with polychaetes, bivalves, crustaceans such as prawns and crabs, cephalopods and small fish effective for most species. As with most species, live bait is known to produce better catches. Lure fishing for whiting is not normally practiced, but saltwater flies have been used to good effect, as have small soft plastic lures and surface lures like poppers and stick baits imitating a fleeing fish or prawn. this type of fishing has experienced increasing popularity the last couple of years. In some areas, restrictions to the amount and size of fish are in place and enforced by fishery authorities.

=== Aquaculture ===
A number of sillaginid species have been the subject of brackish water aquaculture in Asia and India, with species including S. japonica commonly bred for consumption. In Australia, research has been undertaken in the breeding of sand whiting and King George whiting, and so far only sand whiting shows promise for commercial viability. King George whiting have been found to take too long to develop to be sustainable, but the use of growth hormones is being investigated. In Australia, aquaculturally bred sand whiting have also been used to stock depleted estuaries.
