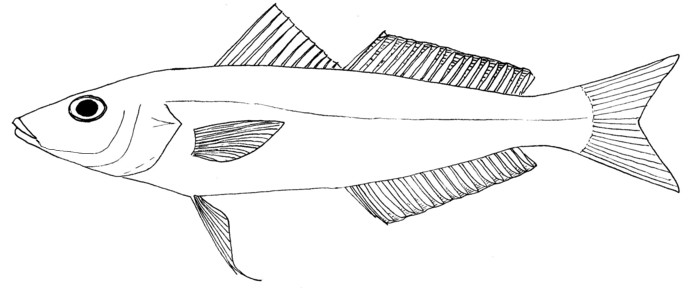

Scientific classification
- Kingdom: Animalia
- Phylum: Chordata
- Class: Actinopterygii
- Order: Acanthuriformes
- Family: Sillaginidae
- Genus: Sillago
- Species: S. ingenuua

Binomial name
- Sillago ingenuua McKay, 1985
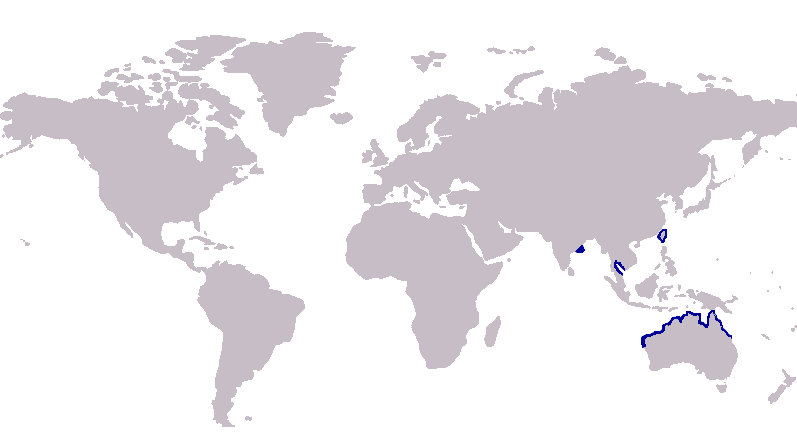
- Range of the bay whiting

= Bay whiting =

Species of fish

The bay whiting (Sillago ingenue) is a species of coastal marine fish of the smelt-whiting family, Sillaginidae. The bay whiting's range extends throughout the west Indian Ocean, including northern Australia, Thailand, India and Taiwan, where it inhabits protected waters. It is benthic in nature, preying on shrimps, polychaetes and molluscs, however little else is known of its biology. Bay whiting are an important part of some inshore fisheries around Australia and Asia, where subsistence and commercial fishermen regularly take the species.

== Taxonomy and naming ==
The bay whiting is one of over 30 species in the genus Sillago, which is one of five genera belonging to the smelt whiting family Sillaginidae, this family was previously considered to be part of the Percoidea, a suborder of the Perciformes. The 5th edition of Fishes of the World classifies the Sillaginidae in the order Spariformes.

The species was first identified and named Sillago ingenuua by Roland McKay in his comprehensive 1985 review of the family Sillaginidae, with the holotype collected near Chantaburi, in the Gulf of Thailand in 1975. Prior to this official naming, the species had been misidentified as Sillago argentifasciata by Shao and Chang in 1978 and again in 1980 by Dutt and Sujatha. The binomial name is derived from the Latin ingenuus, meaning "freeborn", in reference to Thailand where the holotype was collected. The only common name, bay whiting is in reference to the species usual habitat.

== Description ==
As with most of the genus Sillago, the bay whiting has a slightly compressed, elongate body tapering toward the terminal mouth. The body is covered in small ctenoid scales extending to the two rows of cheek scales and head. The first dorsal fin has 11 spines and the second dorsal fin has 1 leading spine with 17 soft rays posterior. The anal fin is similar to the second dorsal fin, but has 2 spines with 17 soft rays posterior to the spines. Other distinguishing features include 66 to 70 lateral line scales and a total of 33 vertebrae. The species has a known maximum length of 20 cm.

The swim bladder has a short anterior extension, which is significantly longer in older individuals, while there are also 5 short, pointed anterolateral projections. There is a single, poorly developed posterior projection and a poorly developed duct like process on the ventral surface.

The bay whiting has a pale sandy brown head and body, ranging to a light fawn with no obvious mid-lateral silvery band as in S. argentifasciata. All fins are hyaline in appearance, and the pectoral fin has no dark spot at the base. Th operculum is almost clear, with the inner dark brown surface showing through. The tip of the nose is occasionally dark.

== Distribution and habitat ==
The bay whiting is known from a fairly patchy distribution, inhabiting the Gulf of Thailand, India, Taiwan and northern Australia from Shark Bay around the northern coast to Adolphus Passage, north-eastern Queensland. McKay suggests that it may be far more widespread, but commonly misidentified as S. argentifasciata, or in the case of small subsistence fisheries, has not been reported at all.

The species inhabits inshore coastal waters, and is known from depths between 20 and 50 m. Bay whiting, like many other sillaginids are known to inhabit estuaries, but little research has been done on their habitat preference.

== Diet ==
The diet of bay whiting has been the focus of a study investigating trophic relations between this species, Sillago sihama, and other similarly distributed fish of the South China Sea. In this location, it was found bay whiting predominantly prey on a variety of shrimp species, polychaete worms and Mantis shrimp, with minor amounts of crabs, sea urchins, bivalves and copepods. Unlike other species of sillaginid, the bay whiting doesn't have a large dietary shift as it moves to adulthood, causing parents to compete with offspring to an extent. The diet is, however, offset from the co-occurring S. sihama, preventing significant competition from this species.

== Relationship to humans ==
The bay whiting is often taken by trawlers operating on the northwest shelf of Western Australia and southward to Shark Bay. This species is very commonly trawled near Torres Straits to the north of Queensland. It is also one of the most important species to traditional and minor commercial fisheries along the Asian coast. It is marketed fresh throughout its range. Bay whiting are occasionally caught by recreational fishermen, with the largest recorded fish caught by an angler weighing only 0.047 kg.
