= Sillago caudicula =

Scientific classification
- Domain: Eukaryota
- Kingdom: Animalia
- Phylum: Chordata
- Class: Actinopterygii
- Order: Acanthuriformes
- Family: Sillaginidae
- Genus: Sillago
- Species: S. caudicula

Binomial name
- Sillago caudicula Kaga, Imamura & Nakaya, 2010

Species of ray-finned fish

Sillago caudicula is a species of marine ray-finned fish in the smelt-whiting family Sillaginidae. It is found in the western Indian Ocean near Oman.

== Description ==
Sillago caudicula reaches a standard length of 14.9 cm (5.9 in).
