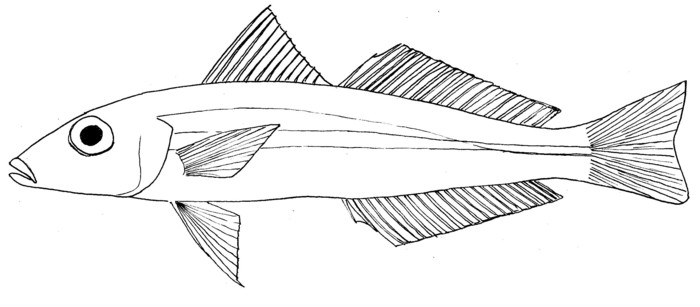

Scientific classification
- Kingdom: Animalia
- Phylum: Chordata
- Class: Actinopterygii
- Order: Acanthuriformes
- Family: Sillaginidae
- Genus: Sillaginops; Kaga, 2013
- Species: S. macrolepis

Binomial name
- Sillaginops macrolepis (Bleeker, 1859)
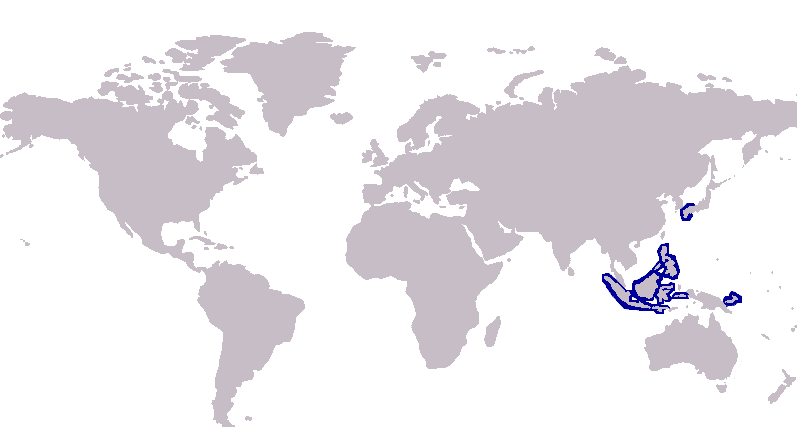
- Range of the large-scale whiting

Synonyms
- Sillago macrolepis Bleeker, 1859

= Large-scale whiting =

Species of fish

The large-scale whiting (Sillaginops macrolepis) the only member of the genus Sillaginops, is a poorly understood species of coastal marine fish of the smelt- whiting family Sillaginidae. First described in 1859, the large-scale whiting is known to inhabit shallow waters along the coasts of a number of Indo-Pacific countries including Japan, Indonesia, Philippines and the Solomon Islands. Little is known of the species biology, even though it is of minor importance to fisheries throughout its range.

The species was first scientifically described by the Dutch ichthyologist Pieter Bleeker in 1859 from a specimen collected from the waters of Batavia in Bali, Indonesia. This specimen was designated to be the holotype.

== Description ==
As with most of the family Sillaginidae, the large-scale whiting has a slightly compressed, elongate body tapering toward the terminal mouth. The body is covered in small ctenoid scales, except for the two rows of cheek scales which are mostly cycloid. The first dorsal fin has 11 spines and the second dorsal fin has 1 leading spine with 19 to 21 soft rays posterior. The anal fin is similar to the second dorsal fin, but has 2 spines with 19 to 21 soft rays posterior to the spines. Other distinguishing features include 51 to 56 lateral line scales and a total of 34 vertebrae. The species has a known maximum length of over 16 cm.

While reviewing the species, McKay only was able to examine the swim bladders of juveniles. He found the juveniles to have well-developed swim bladders with no posterior or anterior extensions, but the duct like process well developed.

The fish is a yellowish colour, being darker above with a diffuse silver longitudinal mid-lateral band on the sides. All fins are hyaline in appearance, with the dorsal fins being dusky with a narrow blackish margin. Juveniles have a series of small brown spots along their back at the base of the dorsal fins.

== Distribution and habitat ==
The large-scale whiting has been recorded from Japan, the Indonesian Archipelago, New Britain, Solomon Islands and the Philippines A 1980 report from India by Dutt and Sajutha is in error and was the first recording of the then undescribed species, Sillago lutea.

The species enters estuaries and may penetrate fresh water rivers, at least as juveniles. Large-scale whiting are only found in relatively shallow water of 0 to 5 m in depth.

== Relationship to humans ==
Although the species is of minor importance at present, it is often caught in trawls and seines, being of slight importance to local fisheries throughout its range.
