= Carp fishing =

Recreational angling for carp

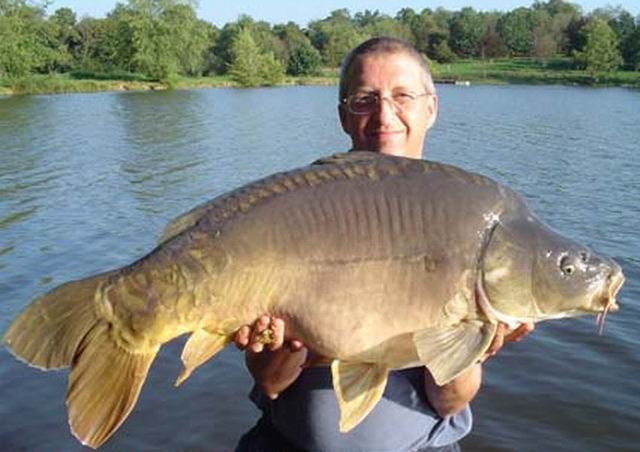
Angler with a 17 kilogram mirror carp

Carp is a common name for various species of freshwater fish from the family Cyprinidae that are native to Eurasia and sought after by some recreational fishermen. Certain carp species have been introduced, with mixed results, to various other locations around the world, and even declared invasive in certain regions.

Izaak Walton said about carp in The Compleat Angler, "The carp is the queen of rivers; a stately, good, and a very subtil fish; that was not at first bred, nor hath been long in England, but is now naturalised".

== Managing recreational carp ==
Good carp fishing can be found in many different types of water. Many find rivers to provide some of the most challenging, but rewarding, fishing. For rivers that connect directly with the ocean, the largest carp often reside in the stretch between the beginning of the tidal influence and where the salinity becomes intolerable to the carp. For example, a carp of 42.03 pounds was caught from the tidal stretch of the lower Connecticut River in southern Connecticut.

Bowfishing for carp is a controversial sport. When properly used as part of an integrated management plan it may help limit the negative impact of carp. Carp bowfishers often view themselves as ridding the water of undesirable fish, however this can have unintended consequences with the number of carp actually increasing while the average size decreases. New evidence has shown that common carp reduction may cause malnourishment in large mouth bass in heavily bow fished waters.

In the US, Texas and Connecticut are the only states with managed carp waters, such as Lady Bird Lake.

== Eating habits ==
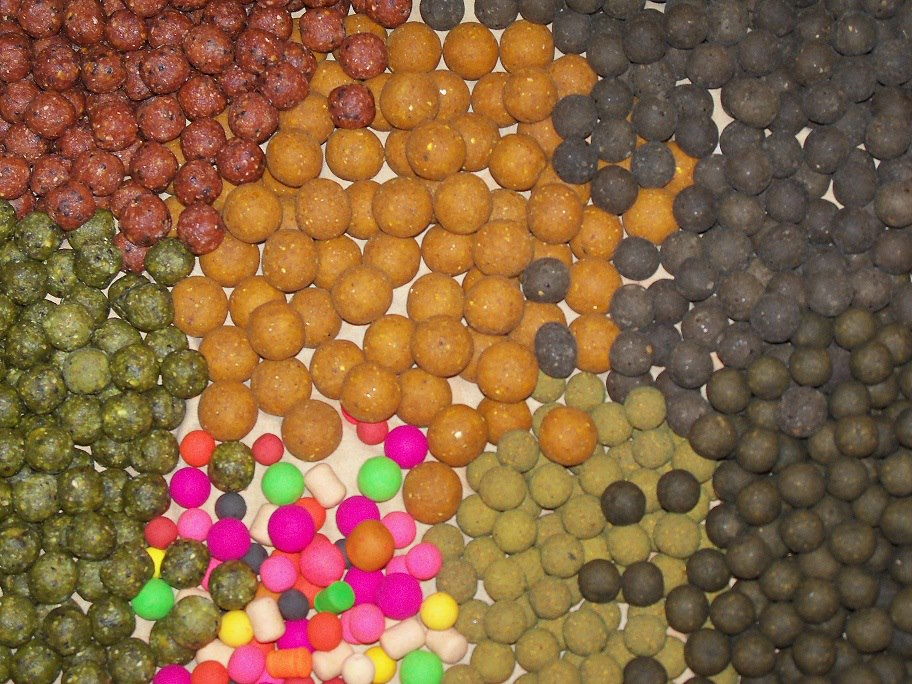
Selection of Boilies

Boilies, carp bait made from a boiled paste, are used in American and European carp angling. Boilies can be brightly colored or more natural in appearance. Boilies are made from milk proteins, eggs and artificial flavors, these are then boiled in water hence the name boilies. Pack bait, an American variation of the European Method Mix, utilizes a Binder and a Breaker to bind a ball of bait together and then cause it to break open once it is cast to its desired location. Tiger nuts are also commonly used as a hook or hair rig bait as well as Sweet Corn, Boiled Field, canned meat, worms, and peanuts (which have been banned in some European swims). In South Africa the most popular form of carp fishing is using a "mielie bomb", it is a spring shaped frame with crushed corn and maize pressed onto it. Baiting is often performed using baiting tools to increase accuracy and range.

However, in some countries, due to their habit of grubbing through bottom sediments for food and consequential alteration of their environment, they destroy, uproot and disturb submerged vegetation causing serious damage to native duck and fish populations. In Australia there is anecdotal and mounting scientific evidence that introduced carp are the cause of permanent turbidity and loss of submerged vegetation in the Murray-Darling river system, with severe consequences for river ecosystems, water quality and native fish species.

Carp are known to change their feeding habits dependent upon the climate at any given time, wind direction, temperate and phases of the moon are common factors which affect the feeding habits of carp.

== Common carp ==
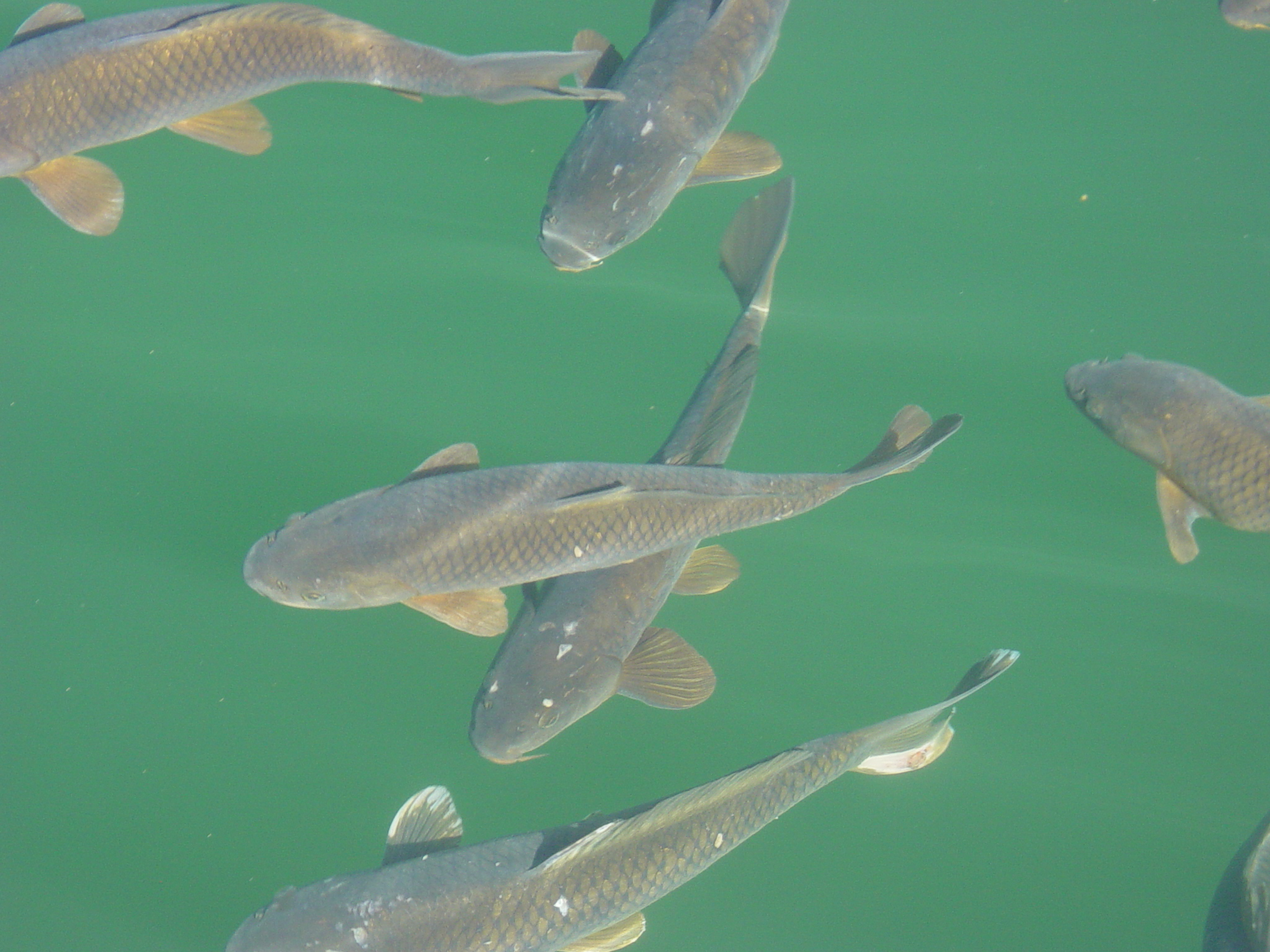
Common carp in Lake Powell

The common carp, or European carp, are native to Asia and Eastern Europe. They have been introduced, sometimes illegally, into environments worldwide, and are often considered an invasive species.

Common carp are very hardy and can easily adapt to most conditions, though they prefer large bodies of slow or standing water and soft, vegetative sediments. They can typically be found in small schools, although larger carp often lead a solitary existence. They natively live in a temperate climate in fresh or brackish water with a 7.0 – 9.0 pH, and a temperature range of 35.0–85.0 °F (1.7–29.4 °C).

Common carp are extremely popular with anglers in many parts of Europe, and their popularity is slowly increasing among anglers in the United States (though still considered pests and often destroyed in many areas). Carp anglers use various types of rigs, including hair rigs, pop-up rigs, stiff rigs, zig rigs, blow-back rigs, D rigs, greedy pig rigs, combi rigs, helicopter rigs, withy pool rigs, chod rigs, bolt rigs, and medusa rigs. They use a variety of baits, including boilies, sweet corn, maggots, and bread.

American fly fishermen have begun to target carp, finding them similar to bonefish in their size and fight. Kirk Deeter, an editor at Field & Stream, goes fly-fishing for carp on the South Platte River in downtown Denver, Colorado, which he says testifies to their ability to adapt to almost any habitat. "I think carp are maligned here because they're not considered classic table fare—though they were brought to North America in the 1800s specifically for that purpose", he says. "If you want to sight cast to a tailing fish that might be 10 pounds (5 kg) or more, carp are it". In England, it is possible to fish for common carp with a fly rod by pre-baiting an area of a lake with dog biscuits, or 'mixers'. This attracts the fish to begin feeding from the surface, where the fly fishers target them with artificial flies that represent dog biscuits. Like in America, this aspect of the sport is growing.

Carp are also popular with spear and bow fisherman. They can grow to a length of 1.2 metres (3.9 ft) and the oldest recorded age of a wild fish is 38 years. A world record mirror carp that weighed 51.2 kilograms (113 lb) was caught in Hungary in November 2018. The wild, non-domesticated forms tend to be much less stocky at around 20% – 33% the maximum size. In captivity, Cyprinus carpio have lived as long as 47 years.

== Silver carp ==
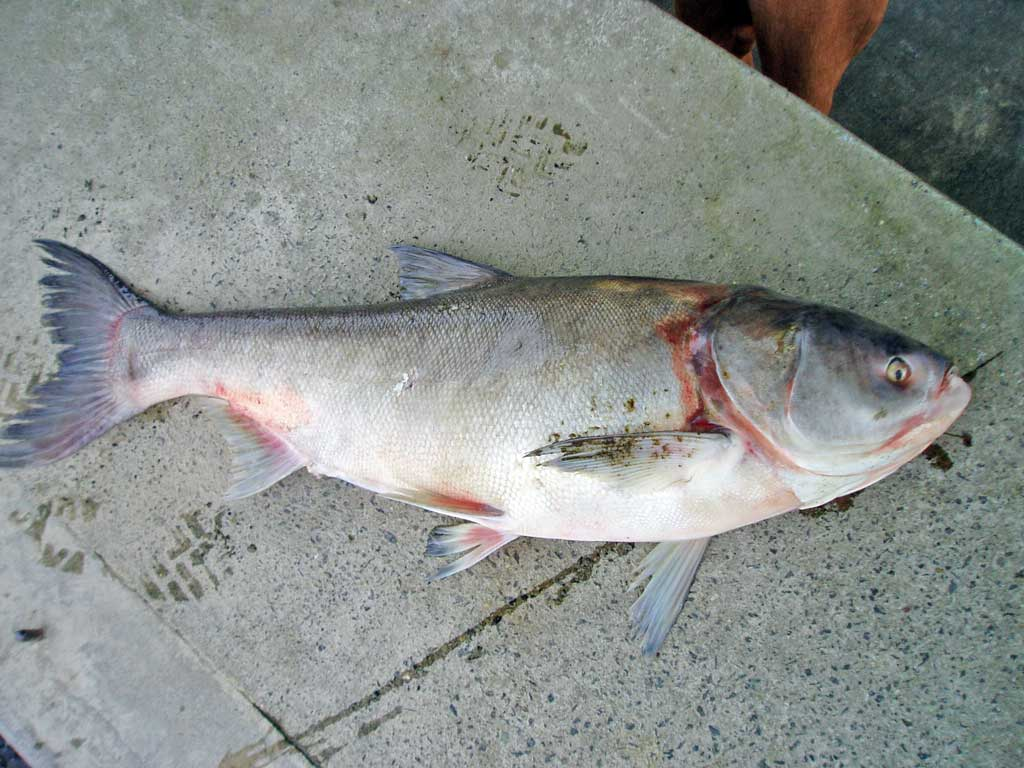
Silver carp

Silver carp are filter feeders, and thus are difficult to catch on typical hook and line gear. Special methods have been developed for these fish, the most important being the "suspension method" usually consisting of a large dough ball that disintegrates slowly, surrounded by a nest of tiny hooks that are not embedded in the bait. The entire apparatus is suspended below a large bobber. The fish feed on the small particles that are released from the dough ball and will bump against the dough ball, with the intention of breaking off more small particles that can be filtered from the water, eventually becoming hooked on the tiny hooks.

In some areas, it is also legal to use "snagging gear" in which large, weighted treble hooks are jerked through the water, to snag the fish. In the United States, silver carp are also popular targets for bowfishermen; they are shot both from the water and from the air. In the latter case, boats are used to scare the fish and entice them to jump, and the fish are shot from the air when the fish jump.

== Bighead carp ==
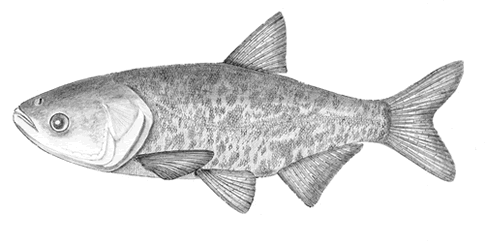
Bighead carp

Although bighead carp reach large size, they are difficult to capture with a rod and reel because of their filter-feeding habits. They may be captured by the "suspension method" used to catch silver carp, or, where legal, by snagging them by jerking a weighted treble hook through the water. Bighead carp cannot be shot from the air like silver carp, because, unlike the silver carp, they do not jump from the water in response to moving boats. However, they often feed near the surface where they can be shot by bowfishers. The bowfishing record, captured in the Mississippi River near Alton, Illinois in May 2008, is 92.5 kg (204 lb).

== Crucian carp ==
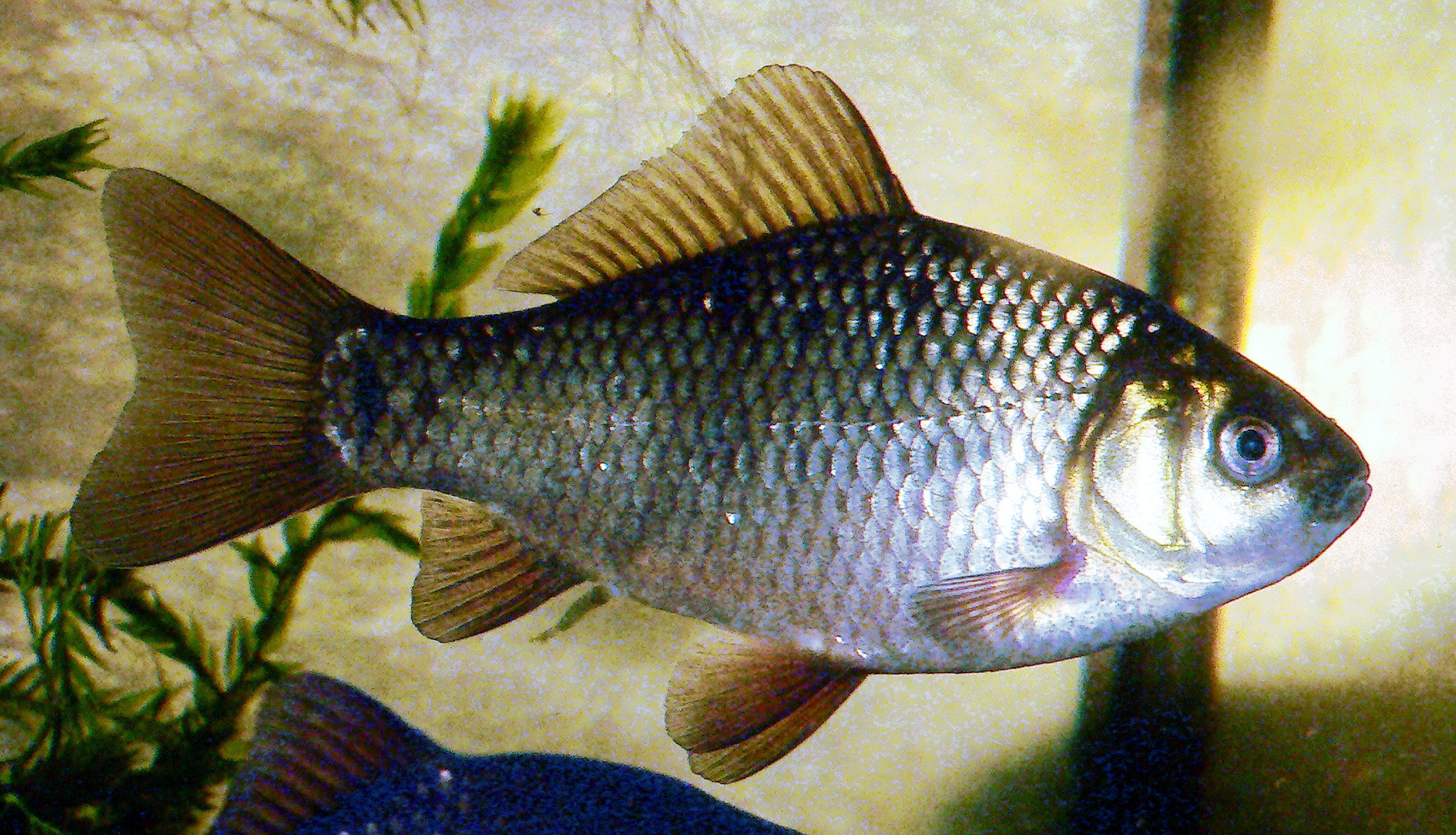
Crucian carp

Crucian carp inhabit lakes, ponds, and slow-moving rivers throughout Europe and Asia. They rarely exceed a weight of over 3.3 pounds (1.5 kg). They are often caught as a sport fish: the British rod-caught record for largest crucian is 4 lb 14.0 oz (2.212 kg) caught by Adam Brookbanks, from Barham Syndicate Lake, Ipswich in 2024. Several claims for a breakage of this record have been disallowed as the specimens have not been said to have been "true" crucians, but hybrids between the carp and one of its relatives, such as the goldfish, which are not native to the British Isles. These hybrids often exhibit hybrid vigour or heterosis, being much more adept at finding food and evading predators than either of their parents, and thus pose somewhat of a threat to the native carp population, and to other native aquatic animals. Such fish, known as F1 carp, are now regularly stocked into ponds in the United Kingdom where the intention is mainly match fishing rather than specimen hunting. They are immune to Koi Herpes Virus which makes them ideal for mass-stocking in commercial ponds, along with their hybrid sterility.

Japanese white crucian carp ((Ja: hera-buna (ヘラブナ), Herabuna Carp) are extremely popular with anglers in fishing ponds in many parts of Japan.

== Grass carp ==
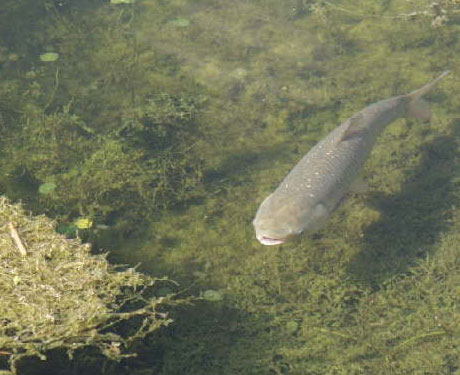
Grass Carp

The grass carp grows rapidly, and young fish stocked in the spring at 20 centimetres (7.9 in) can reach 45 centimetres (18 in) by fall. Adults often attain nearly 1.2 metres (3.9 ft) in length and over 18 kilograms (40 lb) in weight. According to one study, they live an average of 5–9 years with the oldest at 11 years. They eat up to three times their own body weight daily. They thrive in small lakes and backwaters that provide an abundant supply of fresh water vegetation. Adults of the species feed primarily on aquatic plants. They feed on higher aquatic plants and submerged terrestrial vegetation, but may also take detritus, insects, and other invertebrates.

The species was deliberately introduced to control aquatic weeds in the United States in 1963 and in the Netherlands in 1973. It was also introduced into New Zealand along with stocks of goldfish but the distribution is carefully controlled to prevent it from becoming a more widespread pest. Grass carp require long rivers for the survival of the eggs and very young fish, and they have become very abundant in the large rivers of the central United States.

Grass carp are strong fighters on a rod and reel, but because of their vegetarian habits and their wariness, they can be difficult to catch. Chumming with corn adds to success. Canned corn, cherry tomatoes, and, despite their primarily vegetarian habits, worms can sometimes be successful baits. They are popular, but wary, quarry for bowfishers where bowfishing for grass carp is legal.

== Around the world ==
Attitudes to carp as a recreation or sport fish vary around the world.

- In Europe, even when not fished for food, they are eagerly sought by anglers, being considered highly prized coarse fish that are difficult to hook. The UK has a thriving carp angling market. It is the fastest-growing angling market in the UK. TV programs such as Monster Carp have raised awareness of the sport, in addition to commercial fisheries making carp fishing more accessible.

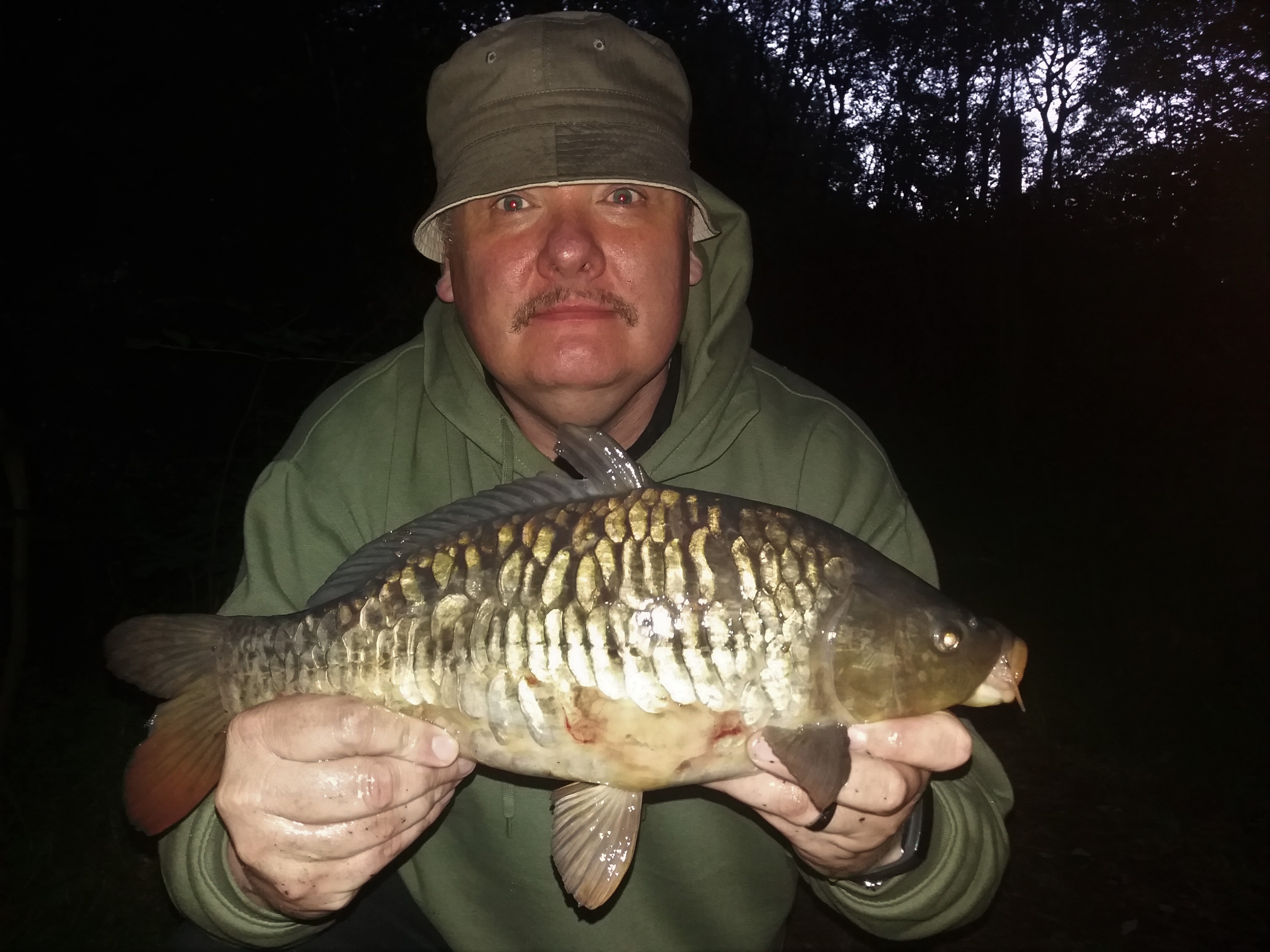
UK Carp Angler with small mirror carp

- In the United States, the carp is also classified as a rough fish as well as damaging naturalized exotic species but with sporting qualities. Many states' departments of natural resources are beginning to view the carp as an angling fish instead of a maligned pest. Groups such as the Carp Anglers Group and American Carp Society promote the sport and work with fisheries departments to organize events to introduce and expose others to the unique opportunity the carp offers freshwater anglers.
- In Canada, carp are gaining popularity as a worthy sport fish, especially in the provinces of BC and Ontario. Fly fishers sometimes refer to carp as 'The Golden Ghost' or as freshwater 'Bonefish', due to the difficulty anglers have in getting them to take a well presented fly.
- In New Zealand koi carp are regarded as noxious fish, and while recreational fishing is permitted in some areas, koi must be killed when caught.
- In Indonesia, carp is for food usually fried, "pepes". Carp for game fishing in pond, and usually big prize for grass carp. The bait for carp fishing game is "cendol" ("sagu" flour with food attractant)
- In Central Europe there is a strong connection between Christmas and carp fishing. Traditionally in Germany, Poland, Czech Republic and Slovakia man of the house would go and fish for the carp or buy it at the fish market. Fish would be usually brought home alive and kept overnight in the bath. On the Christmas night the carp would be killed and freshly served fried or steamed. Leftovers of the fish would be used to cook a traditional fish soup.
- In Australia they are universally destroyed as pests. In South Australia, if caught it is illegal to release them.

=== France ===
France is one of the most popular destinations in Europe for carp angling, attracting large numbers of visiting anglers, particularly from the United Kingdom. The country's extensive network of public lakes, rivers and canals holds substantial stocks of carp, with fish exceeding 30 kg (66 lb) recorded on several major public waters.

Public fishing in France is governed by a permit system administered through local federations. Anglers must purchase a carte de pêche, which is issued by the relevant departmental federation (Fédération Nationale de la Pêche en France - AAPPMA) and is typically valid for a single department. An interfederal permit (carte interfédérale) is available for those wishing to fish across multiple regions.

Night fishing for carp (pêche de nuit) is permitted on designated waters only, with authorised zones varying considerably between departments and subject to annual review by local federations. Regulations covering permitted baits, rod limits and bivouac rules also differ by location, making pre-trip research essential for visiting anglers.

France is divided into 95 metropolitan departments, each with its own federation publishing annual night fishing regulations.

== See also ==
- Chod rig
- Boilie
- Angling
