= Texas rig =

Technique used for fishing with soft plastic lures

The Texas rig is a fishing rig used for angling with soft plastic lures.

It comprises a bullet weight or similar sliding fishing sinker, an offset worm hook, and a soft plastic lure.

Diagram of a Texas rig comprising a soft plastic worm (green), bullet weight (grey), hook (black), and fishing line (blue)

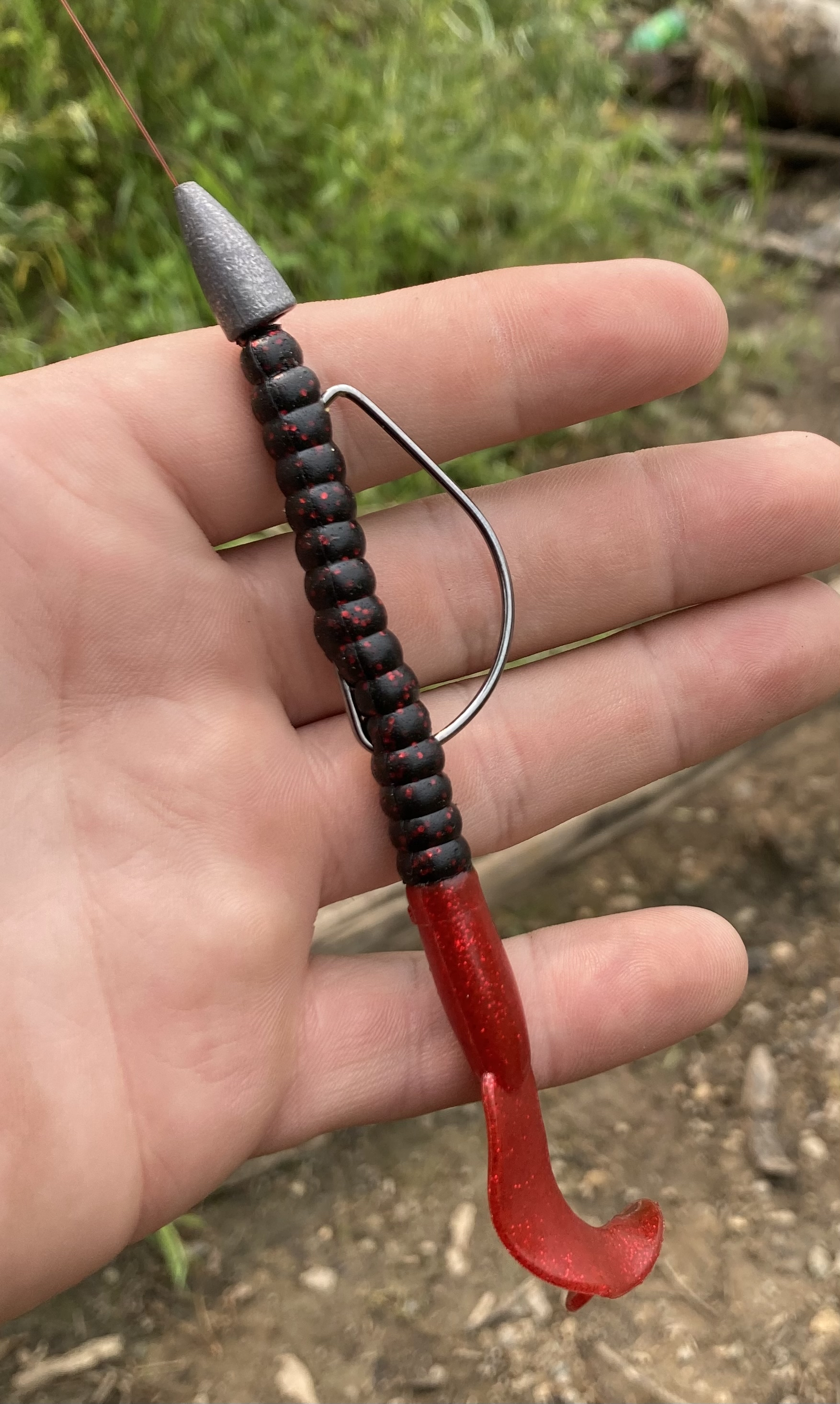
A Texas-rigged ribbontail worm

This rig is most commonly used to target freshwater fish such as largemouth bass and smallmouth bass.

== Usage ==
The Texas rig is typically fished in a cast-and-retrieve style; it is cast into a body of water and worked slowly along the bottom in a manner designed to entice nearby fish. However, fish will often strike this rig as it first sinks into the water.

== Variants ==
In some cases, a glass or plastic bead is threaded onto the line between the weight and the hook. Some anglers believe that the added noise or color provided by the bead serves some advantage in attracting fish, especially in stained or muddied water, as the clicking sound of the weight hitting the bead may imitate the sound of a crayfish, a common food for freshwater bass and similar trophy fish.

Some variants of the Texas rig call for the weight to be "stopped" (i.e. made unable to slide back-and-forth on the line). This is usually accomplished by inserting a toothpick through the weight and breaking it off so that part of the toothpick is lodged between the weight and the line. Others attach a bobber stop just above the weight to keep the latter in place.

Some fishermen keep the point of the hook exposed when rigging a Texas rig, while others embed it fully within the soft plastic of the lure. The former approach, sometimes referred to as a Texpose rig, increases the likelihood of a fish being hooked when it strikes, while the latter approach, sometimes referred to as a weedless Texas rig, reduces the likelihood of the hook getting caught on underwater debris.

In order to reduce the rate of the lure's descent and allow for greater finesse in moving it to entice fish, some fishermen leave out the weight altogether; this is often referred to as a weightless Texas rig.

== Hooking the soft plastic lure ==
One can attach a soft plastic lure to a hook using the below steps, which may be followed either before or after tying the hook to the line.

Insert the point of the hook into the nose of the bait, pushing the hook back out of the lure about 1/4 inch (6.4 mm) from the nose of the lure.	Work the hook through the hole created in Step 1 until the lure reaches the "shoulder" of the hook.
Flip the hook over so that the point is facing the lure.	Insert the hook back into/through the lure.

== See also ==
- Dropshotting
- Carolina rig
- Carp fishing
