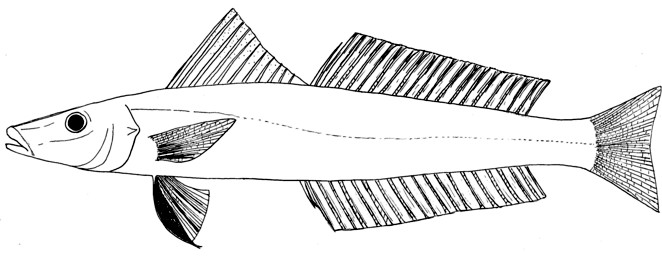

Scientific classification
- Kingdom: Animalia
- Phylum: Chordata
- Class: Actinopterygii
- Order: Acanthuriformes
- Family: Sillaginidae
- Genus: Sillaginopsis; Fowler, 1933
- Species: S. chondropus

Binomial name
- Sillaginopodys chondropus Bleeker, 1849
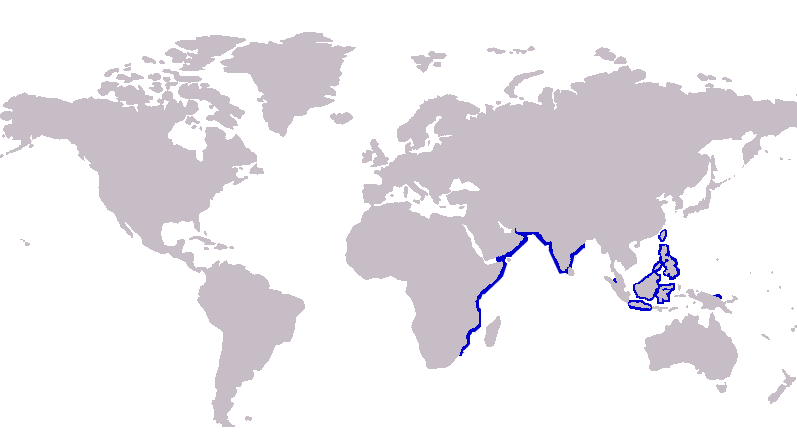
- Range of the club-foot whiting

Synonyms
- Sillago chondropus Bleeker, 1849

= Club-foot whiting =

Species of fish

The club-foot whiting (Sillaginopodys chondropus), also known as the club-foot sillago or thicken-spined sillago, the only member of the monospecific genus Sillaginopodys, is a coastal marine fish of the smelt whiting family Sillaginidae that inhabits a wide range including west Africa, India and the northern Indonesian Archipelago. The species is unique in the morphology of the pelvic spine and fin, making identification of the species easier than most of its relatives. The species is of minor commercial importance, taken by seine net and marketed fresh throughout its range.

The club-foot whiting was first described and named by Pieter Bleeker in 1849, however the exact origin of the holotype specimen is unknown. Bleeker conducted most of his studies on the fishes of South East Asia, and one author has attributed the type specimen to samples collected from the Java Sea. The common name of the species, club-foot whiting, is derived from its unique pelvic fin structure which may look, and possibly act as club shaped 'foot'. The other common name; Horrelvoet sillago, is a name used in Africa and is derived from Afrikaans.

== Description ==
As with most of the family Sillaginidae, the club-foot whiting has a slightly compressed, elongate body tapering toward the terminal mouth, with the species reaching a maximum overall length of 35 cm. The body is covered in small ctenoid scales extending to the cheek and head, which has scales arranged in 3-4 rows. The first dorsal fin has 11 to 12 spines and the second dorsal fin has 1 leading spine with 20 to 22 soft rays posterior. The anal fin has 2 spines with 22 to 23 soft rays posterior to the spines. Possibly the most obvious identifying feature of the species is the characteristic pelvic fin, of which the first ray is modified into a laterally compressed club-like structure that overlaps the much reduced ventral spine at the base of the fin. Other distinguishing features include 66 to 73 lateral line scales and a total of 35 vertebrae.

The swim bladder morphology is also very distinct in the Club-foot whiting, with a structure very different from the rest of the Sillaginidae. It is a very flat, non functional structure that sits just behind the axis vertebra and abruptly narrows to a fine point terminating at the 9th abdominal vertebrae. The organ has no duct like process stemming from the ventral surface unlike other species of the family Sillaginidae.

The club-foot whiting is pale sandy brown colour above, with a paler underside and dusky scale margins. A dull silver grey mid-lateral band is usually present, normally with an accompanying wide dusky band below on the lower sides. The fins are hyaline in colour, with only the spinous first dorsal fin having a light dusting of fine black spots at the tip.>

== Distribution and habitat ==
S. chondropus ranges from South Africa, northward along the west African coast to Pakistan, India, Myanmar, Indonesia, northern New Guinea, Thailand, Philippines and Taiwan. It has never recorded from southern New Guinea or Australia. The species inhabits shallow coastal waters, from depths of 0 to 5 m. In eastern Taiwan, blackish substrates with a strong current and wave action are inhabited, while in India it has been known to enter estuaries. The reduced swim bladder and modified pelvic fin indicates that this species is demersal and may use the pelvic fin pads somewhat like sled runners on the substrate.

== Relationship to humans ==
The club-foot whiting is commonly taken by seine net throughout its range and is generally sold fresh in local markets alongside other species of sillaginid. Small subsidence fisheries in India are known to take substantial amounts of the species as well.
