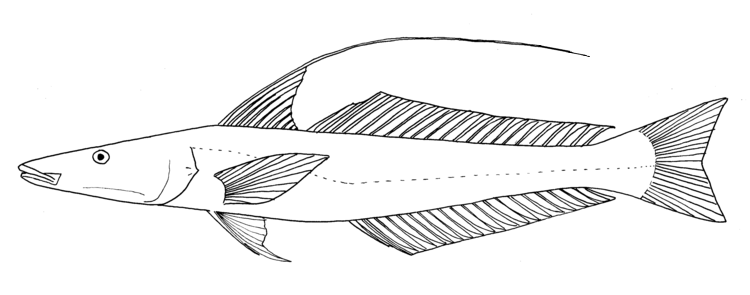

Conservation status
- Least Concern (IUCN 3.1)

Scientific classification
- Kingdom: Animalia
- Phylum: Chordata
- Class: Actinopterygii
- Order: Acanthuriformes
- Family: Sillaginidae
- Genus: Sillaginopsis; T. N. Gill, 1861
- Species: S. panijus

Binomial name
- Sillaginopsis panijus (Hamilton, 1822)
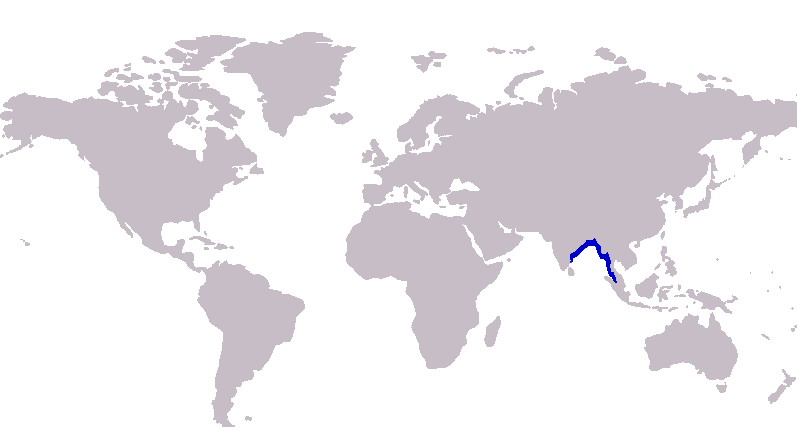
- Range of Gangetic whiting in dark blue

Synonyms
- Cheilodipterus panijus Hamilton, 1822; Sillaginopsis domina (Cuvier, 1829); Sillaginopsis punijas (Hamilton, 1822); Sillago domina Cuvier, 1829; Sillago panjius (Hamilton, 1822)

= Gangetic whiting =

Species of fish

The Gangetic whiting (Sillaginopsis panijus), also known as the Gangetic sillago or flathead sillago, is a species of inshore marine and estuarine fish of the smelt-whiting family, Sillaginidae. It is the most distinctive Asian member of the family due to its flattened head and trailing dorsal fins. Although first described in 1822, it was not placed in its own genus until 1861 when Theodore Gill erected Sillaginopsis, a genus which is still monotypic. Gangetic whiting are of minor commercial importance along the Southeast coast of the Asian continent where it inhabits protected areas.

== Taxonomy and naming ==
The Gangetic whiting is the only species of the genus Sillaginopsis, which itself is one of three genera the family Sillaginidae, containing all the smelt whitings. The Sillaginidae are part of the Percoidei, a suborder of the order Perciformes.

The Gangetic whiting was originally named Cheilodipterus panijus in 1822 by Francis Buchanan-Hamilton from a holotype taken from the Ganges estuary in India. The species was further examined by Gill in 1861 in the first review of the family, entitled "Synopsis of the Sillaginoids", which led to the creation of the genus Sillaginopsis. This new classification changed the binomial name to the currently accepted Sillaginopsis panijus.

== Description ==
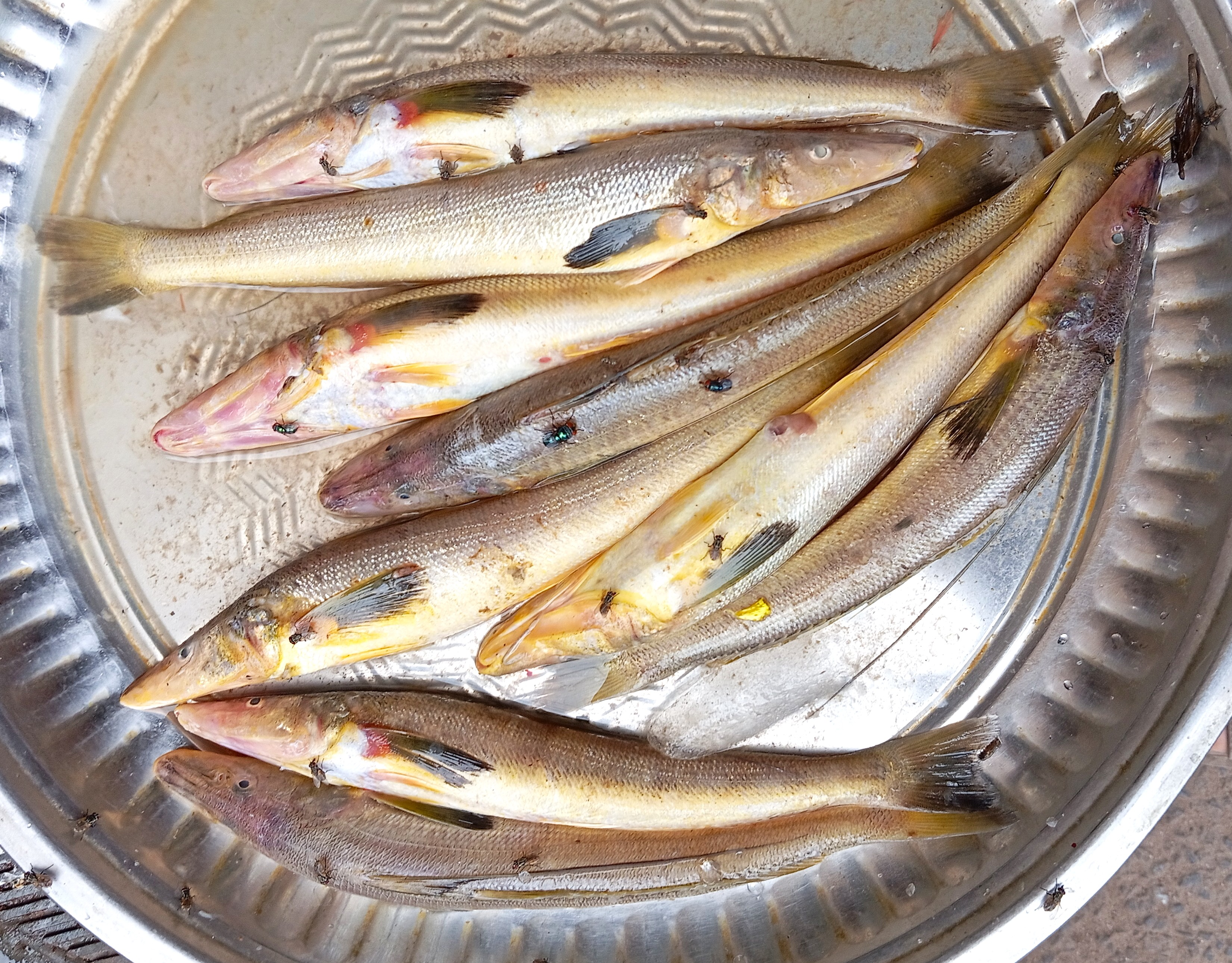
Gangetic sillago (Sillaginopsis panijus). Kolkata, West Bengal

The distinct appearance of the Gangetic whiting makes it the easiest of the smelt whitings to identify. The head of the species is highly depressed, like that of the flatheads, with very small eyes well constricted by the orbits. The first dorsal fin contains ten spines including a large trailing second spine; the second dorsal fin has one spine and 25 to 27 soft rays. The anal fin has two spines and 24 to 27 soft rays. There are 84 to 90 lateral line scales and the species has a total of 42 vertebrae. The species is known to grow to a length of 44 cm.

Another unique feature of this species is its severe reduction or even absence of a swim bladder, which all other members of the family Sillaginidae possess. The Gangetic whiting also has a small mouth with a much shorter lower jaw than upper jaw, with the two anteriormost teeth larger than the rest.

== Distribution and habitat ==
The Gangetic whiting is found on the southern Asian coast from Puducherry in the east, northward along the Coromandel Coast and the Ganges delta, Myanmar, Malaysia and occasionally as far south as the Indonesian archipelago.

The species is often found on silty or muddy substrates in shallow, open bays and estuaries along the coast. Juveniles usually migrate into the upper reaches of estuaries for protection against predation by larger species.

== Biology ==
Gut content analysis has found the Gangetic whiting consumes numerous small fish, benthic and planktonic crustaceans and algae, with its small mouth size restricting the size of food portions.

The Gangetic whiting is the only known species of fish to host the intestinal parasite Dichelyne alatae, found in specimens in West Bengal, with a number of other parasites identified from it.

Otolith and size-age composition studies by Krishnayya (1963) of the commercial catches from the Hooghly River estuary and found that S. panijus probably spawns twice a year during the periods of November to February and August to September. The juveniles migrate toward the upper reaches during March and April and during December where they remain for two to three months. Sexual maturity is attained at a length of about 120 mm.

== Relationship to humans ==
A local fishery exists along the coast of the Bay of Bengal primarily near or on the river deltas, with commercially important fish captured by nets and longlines in the Hooghly and Ganges delta. The Gangetic whiting is sold fresh in local markets, rarely making its way to overseas markets. Juvenile Sillaginopsis panijus are also occasionally traded as brackish water aquarium fish.
