= Sandsinker =

Type of fishing sinker

SandSinka is a lead-free fishing sinker made from biodegradable plastics that is filled with burley or sand or both. This sinker can be used as a float. A standard sinker. A sinker that allows extra weight to be on the line for casting, which will increase distance, then once the sinker is immersed in water it disperses the weight leaving you with a light line. It can also allow for burley to be added, which by design, is directly above the hook.

Sandsinkers are lead-free fishing sinkers made of fabric and filled with sand. Although they do not cast as easily or as far for surf fishing, they are a healthy alternative to lead for fishing from jetties or any situation where casting distance is not a prime consideration.
