= Chod rig =

Fishing rig for carp fishing

The chod rig is a fishing rig used primarily in carp fishing. It is specifically designed to present a bait effectively over soft mud, weeds, or bottom debris without becoming tangled or hidden. A variation of its immediate ancestor, the stiff-hinged rig, the chod rig typically features a rigid or stiff hook-link, an aggressively angled hook point, and a swivel mechanism that allows the hook to rotate 360 degrees around its axis. The rig is almost always used in conjunction with a highly buoyant bait—usually a pop-up boilie—which suspends the hook just above the lakebed.

The chod rig is widely manufactured by commercial fishing tackle companies and was heavily popularized by notable specimen anglers such as Terry Hearn and Jim Shelley. It has been used to capture several famous specimen carp, including Benson and Heather the Leather.

The mechanics of the chod rig—specifically its short, stiff link and rotating hook—are intended to make it difficult for a carp to eject the bait without being hooked. Anglers generally consider the resulting hook holds to be highly secure, which reduces the likelihood of the fish becoming unhooked during the fight and is designed to cause minimal damage to the fish's mouth.
