= Sillago muktijoddhai =

Scientific classification
- Kingdom: Animalia
- Phylum: Chordata
- Class: Actinopterygii
- Division: Teleostei
- Order: Acanthuriformes
- Family: Sillaginidae
- Genus: Sillago
- Species: S. muktijoddhai

Binomial name
- Sillago muktijoddhai Gao & Saha, 2022

Species of fish

Sillago muktijoddhai is a species of marine fish belonging to the family Sillaginidae, found in the coastal waters of the Bay of Bengal in Bangladesh and India.

== Taxonomy ==
Sillago muktijoddhai was described as a new species in 2022. It was previously misidentified as Sillago sihama. Morphology and DNA barcoding were used to establish that it was distinct.

The term muktijoddhai comes from the Bengali word "muktijoddha", which means the freedom fighters of 1971.

== Description ==
Sillago muktijoddhai has an elongated body and a distinctive re-entrant shape on the dorsal side. It features 11 spines in the first dorsal fin, along with one spine and 20 to 21 soft rays in the second dorsal fin. The anal fin is marked by several black dots. The fish also possesses a broad swim bladder with two anterior extensions and two posterior extensions. There are also 8 to 10 lateral processes on either side of the swim bladder, along with a lacuna at the base.
