= Carolina rig =

Plastic bait rig

The Carolina rig. Various soft plastic fishing rigs and methods have evolved through anglers targeting specific fish species.

The Carolina rig is a fishing rig similar to the Texas rig, but with the sinker weight fixed above the hook instead of sliding down to it. The Carolina rig is suitable for beginning fishers, and this specific rig is designed to help fishermen catch bottom-feeding fish, particularly black bass. When placed in water, the lure attached to a Carolina rig will move in a circular motion. Bass are attracted to this movement and are therefore more likely to strike the lure. The Carolina rig also provides benefits for colder seasons, as the heavy weight on the rig allows the bait to reach deeper waters, where fish typically stay in winter months.

== See also ==
- Dropshotting
