= Rig (fishing) =

Arrangement of items used for fishing

The Carolina rig

A rig is an arrangement of items used for fishing. It can be assembled of one or more lines, hooks, sinkers, bobbers, swivels, lures, beads, and other fishing tackle. A rig might be held by a rod, by hand, or attached to a boat or pier. Some rigs are designed to float near the surface of the water, others are designed to sink to the bottom. Some rigs are designed for trolling. Many rigs are designed especially for catching a single species of fish, but will work well for many different species.

== Types of rigs ==
=== Europe ===
- Cheburashka rig

=== North America ===
- Carolina rig
- Chod rig
- Hair rig
- Texas rig
- Ned rigg

=== Oceania ===
- Paternoster rig
- Running sinker rig
- Quill float rig
- Bob float rig

=== Other ===
- Sabiki
