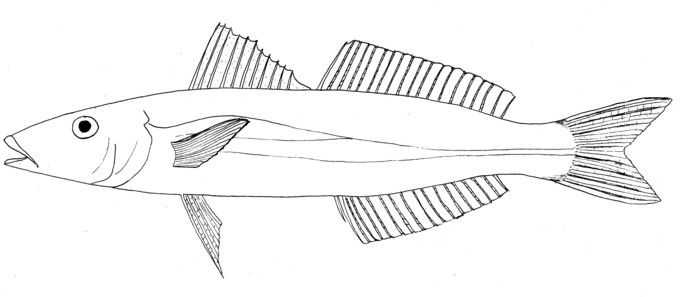

Conservation status
- Data Deficient (IUCN 3.1)

Scientific classification
- Kingdom: Animalia
- Phylum: Chordata
- Class: Actinopterygii
- Order: Acanthuriformes
- Family: Sillaginidae
- Genus: Sillago
- Species: S. argentifasciata

Binomial name
- Sillago argentifasciata C. T. Martin & Montalban, 1935
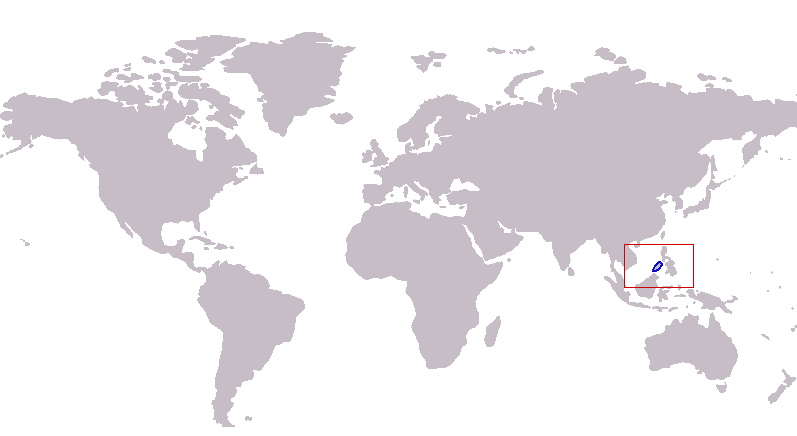
- Range of the silver-banded whiting

= Silver-banded whiting =

Species of fish

The silver-banded whiting (Sillago argentifasciata) is a narrowly distributed species of inshore marine fish of the smelt whiting family Sillaginidae that inhabits the coastline of a single province within the Philippines. The species' taxonomic status is still marginally uncertain, with the last major review of sillaginid fish by McKay proposing S. argentifasciata is a senior synonym of a related species, S. ingenuua. The species takes its name from a brilliant silvery strip running laterally across its body.

== Taxonomy and naming ==
The silver-banded whiting is one of over 30 species in the genus Sillago, which is one of five genera belonging to the smelt whiting family Sillaginidae, this family was previously considered to be part of the Percoidea, a suborder of the Perciformes. The 5th edition of Fishes of the World classifies the Sillaginidae in the order Spariformes.

The species was first identified and named Sillago argentifasciata by Martin and Montalban in 1935 from the holotype specimen collected in the waters of Lumbucan Island in the Philippines. The common name 'silver-banded whiting' is derived from the longitudinal silver band on the side of the species. The holotype of the species was not examined by McKay in his comprehensive review of the Sillaginidae due to its destruction in World War II, but he proposed that the species may be a senior synonym of S. ingenuua. However, he also noted that the species possessed a number of characters which distinguished it from its relatives and suggested further collecting was needed before the taxonomic status of the species was certain.

== Description ==
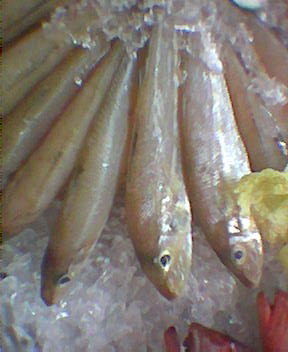
Silver-banded whiting for sale in the Philippines as 'asuhos'

The silver-banded whiting shows the same basic body profile as the rest of the members of the genus Sillago, possessing an elongate, slightly compressed body tapering toward the terminal mouth, with two apparent dorsal fins. The species has a more curved ventral profile than most of its relatives however, and within its known range, this and the silvery band may be enough to identify it in the field. More definitive characteristics are the dorsal and anal fins, with the first dorsal fin possessing 11 spines while the second dorsal contains one spine and 17 or 18 soft rays posterior to the spines. The anal fin has two spines followed by 17 soft rays. Like all smelt-whitings, its body is covered in ctenoid scales, with a lateral line scale count of 66, while the cheek has three rows of scales, those on the upper row cycloid, and on the lower two rows ctenoid. The vertebrae count and swim bladder morphology for the species is currently unknown, but may be revealed by further collecting.

The silver-banded whiting's name is derived from the brilliant silvery longitudinal band which runs from the base of the pectoral fin to the base of the caudal fin. The body is an overall dull silvery white, while the breast and operculum are also a silvery colour. The upper portion of each dorsal spine and ray is sparsely dotted with black, while the other fins are hyaline.

== Distribution and habitat ==
The silver-banded whiting is known only from a single island in the Western Central Pacific; Lumbucan Island in Palawan, a province of the Philippines. Nothing is known of the habitat or biology of this species, and total contribution to local fisheries is also unknown. A number of species of whiting are taken in the region as food and are commonly marketed under the title of 'asuhos', with the silver-banded whiting likely among them.
