= Fishing sinker =

Weight used on a fishing line

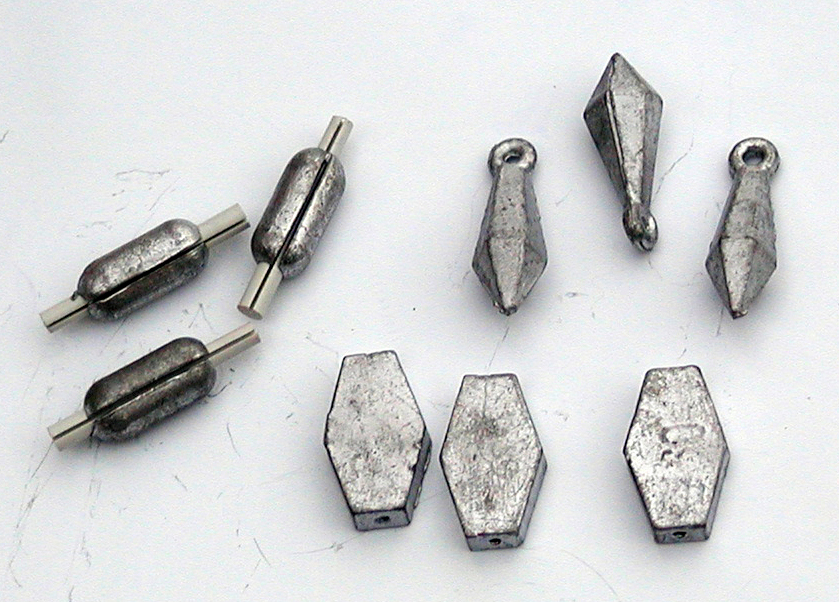
Three types of small lead sinkers

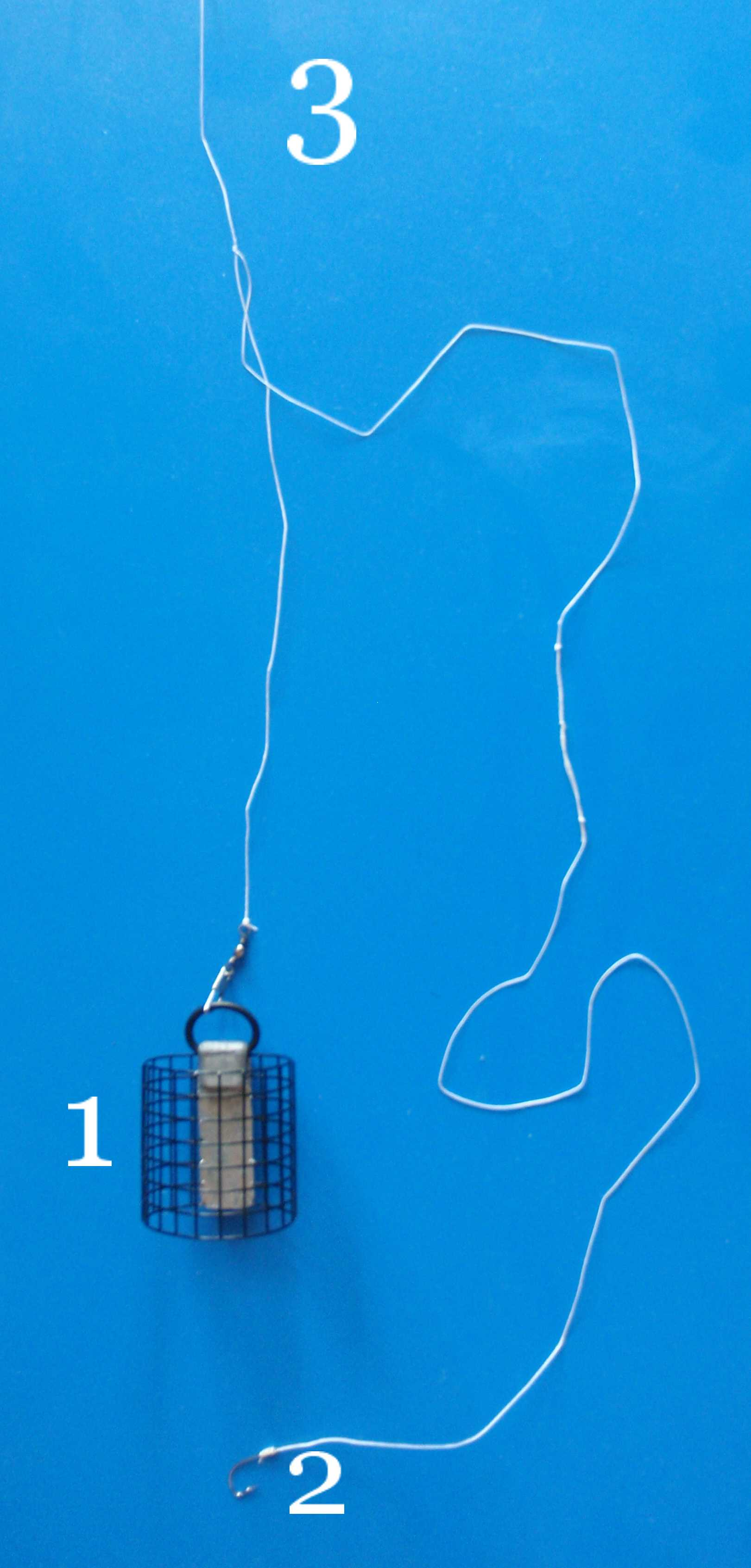
Method feeder, a special type of sinker that holds groundbait

A fishing sinker, plummet, or knoch is a weight used in conjunction with a fishing lure or hook to increase its rate of sink, anchoring ability, and/or casting distance. Fishing sinkers may be as small as 1 gram (0.035 oz) for applications in shallow water, and even smaller for fly fishing applications, or as large as several pounds (>1 kg) or considerably more for deep sea fishing. They are formed into many different shapes for diverse fishing applications. Environmental concerns surround the usage of lead and other materials in fishing sinkers.

== Types ==
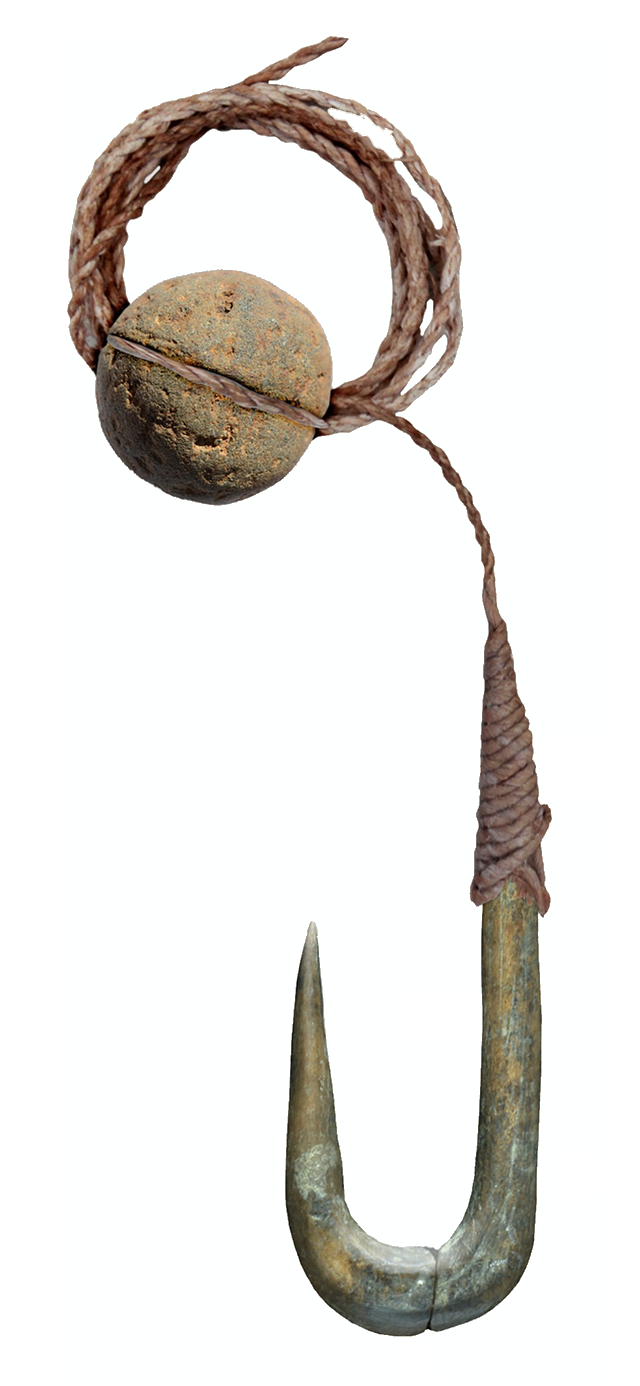
Prehistoric stone fishing hook and sinker (a grooved pebble), used on the Jordan River during the Late Epipalaeolithic

A large variety of sinkers exist, whose specific use depends on the fish pursued, the environment, the current, and personal preference.

=== Pyramid sinkers ===
Pyramid sinkers are shaped like a pyramid and are used when it is desirable to anchor on the bottom of water bodies. They are attached to the terminal end of fishing line by loops of brass.

=== Barrel or egg sinkers ===
Barrel or egg sinkers are rounded and often bead-like with a narrow hole through which fishing line is threaded. These sinkers are desirable on rock or debris covered substrates.

=== Split-shot sinkers ===
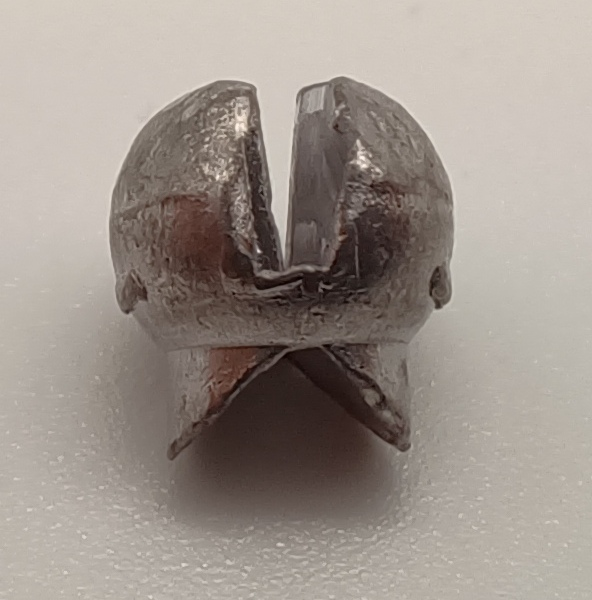
Split shot (close up)

Split-shot sinkers are small and round with a split cutting halfway through the sinker. The split can be placed on a piece of fishing line and then crimped closed. This feature makes adding and removing the weights easy and quick.

=== Bullet sinkers ===
Bullet sinkers are bullet-shaped and used widely on largemouth bass fishing for rigging plastic worms "Texas-style".

=== Dipsey ===
Dipsey sinkers are ovate or egg-shaped and are attached to the fishing line with a loop of brass wire embedded in the sinker.

=== Bank sinker ===
Bank sinkers are long and ovate and have a small hole at the top for the fishing line to thread through.

=== Claw sinker ===
A claw sinker consists of a sinker weight which is typically of round shape, and a number of metal wire spikes grouped around the sinker weight acting as barbs. Claw sinkers are used in surf fishing on sandy bottoms with strong currents, mainly to prevent the sinker from getting carried off with the current. Upon casting a claw sinker, the line is briefly tugged so that the claws will dig themselves into the sand, allowing the rig to stay in place.

=== Deep drop weight ===
A deep drop weight is used to reach the bottom in deeper offshore fishing applications. These fishing weights are typically cylindrical in with a brass eyelet at the top for attaching to a rig. Weights for this style of sinker range from one pound to as much as fourteen pounds. Target species include tilefish, grouper, and swordfish, among others.

== Materials ==
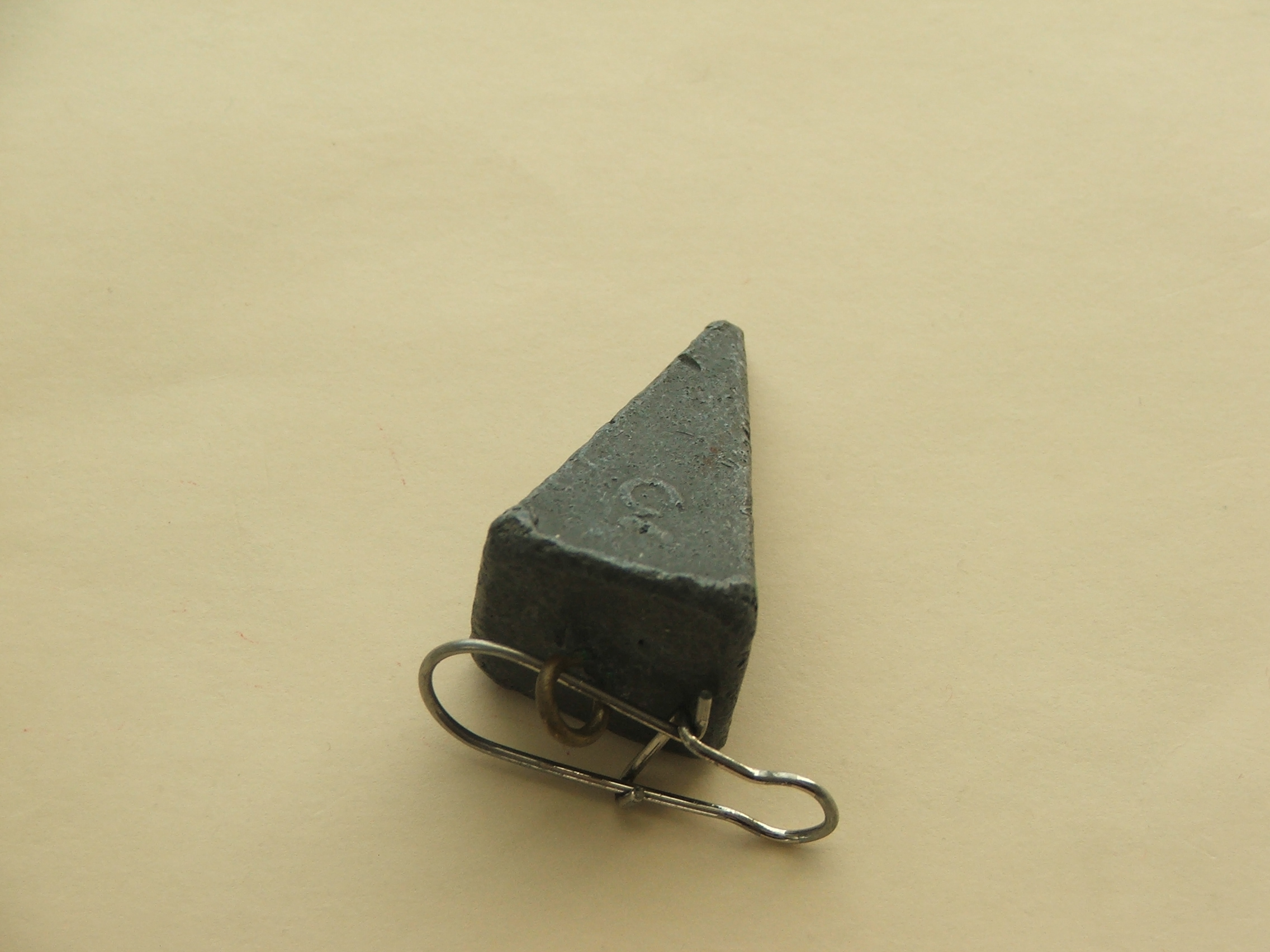
A pyramid sinker made of lead, nowadays widely regarded as too toxic a material

An ideal material for a fishing sinker is environmentally acceptable, cheap and dense. Density is desirable as weights must be as small as possible, in order to minimize visual cues which could drive fish away from a fishing operation.

In ancient times as well as sometimes today, fishing sinkers consisted of materials found ordinarily in the natural environment, such as stones, rocks, or bone. Later, lead became the material of choice for sinkers due to its low cost, ease of production and casting, chemical inertness (resistance to corrosion), and density. However, lead is known to cause lead poisoning and enter the environment as a result of the inevitable occasional loss of fishing sinkers during routine fishing. Thus, most lead-based fishing sinkers have been outlawed in the United Kingdom (under 1 oz weight), Canada, and some states in the United States. Lead based fishing sinkers are banned in all of US and Canadian National Parks. These bans have motivated the use of various other materials in sinkers.

Steel, brass, and bismuth sinkers have been marketed, but anglers have not widely adopted them due to their lower density and higher cost compared to lead. Sandsinkers have also been developed, using sand as weight. However, sand has a comparably low density to that of lead and makes a poor replacement. Tungsten is now in use, especially among largemouth bass anglers. Although several times costlier than lead, tungsten is just under twice as dense as lead and thus found desirable. The environmental effects of tungsten, however, are essentially unknown. Another variant of lead-free fishing weights is presented by the Czech brand UFO Sinker, which offers weights made of heavy concrete, that can be pulled out of the water using a magnet.

More recently, terminal tackle manufacturers are experimenting with high density composite resins. These materials present a non-toxic alternative to lead sinkers at a lower monetary cost than alternative metallic sinkers.

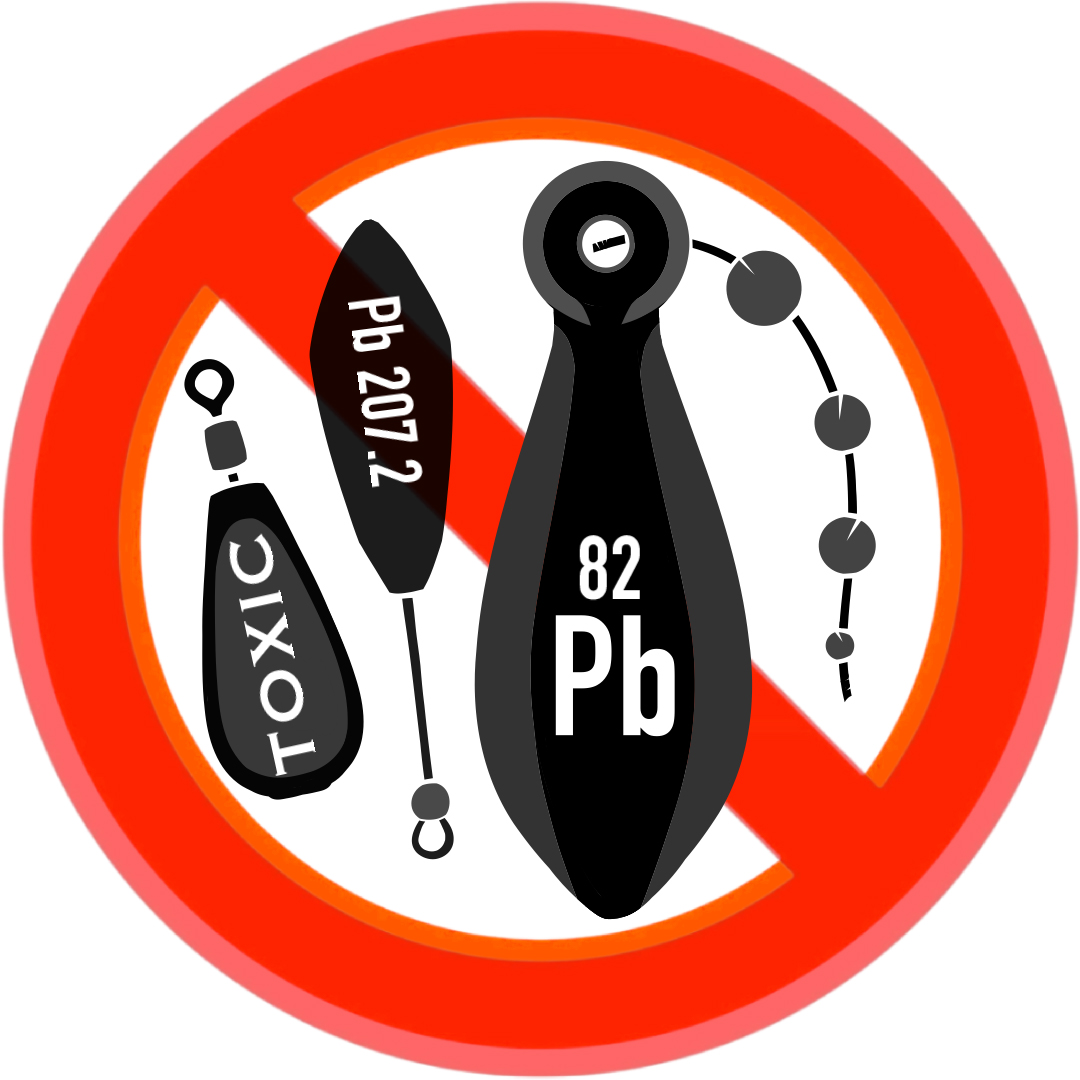
Its widespread use has caused extensive environmental contamination. With a wide range of adverse effects including losses in biodiversity, changes in community composition, decreased growth and reproductive rates in plants and animals, and neurological effects in vertebrates .
