= Quiver tip =

Fishing bite indicator

A quiver tip is a flexible extension to a fishing rod which is designed to vibrate, or quiver, when a fish takes the bait. The main characteristic of its design is its sensitivity. It is a popular and very effective method of bite indication both on still and running water, and is used far more often in bottom fishing. It is not used in game fishing (i.e. for salmon, trout and sea trout) and is seldom, if ever, used when fishing for very large coarse fish (e.g. carp or pike). In essence, the angler watches the tip of the fishing rod to detect bites as opposed to, say, a float or an electronic bite alarm.

== Description ==
The quiver tip is a thin, light, flexible extension of the fishing rod, and relays underwater information by magnifying vibrations transmitted to the rod from the fishing line. The rod is specially designed to take quiver tips; nowadays, they are often called leger or feeder rods. Very sensitive float rods can be used for quiver tip fishing, but normally fishermen have a specialist rod especially for the task. The eyed tip of approximately 1–2 ft (300–610 mm) in length is attached as a detachable extension to the rod end via a put-in or screw-in method. The quiver tip itself is often coupled with a jingle bell to audibly alert the angler.

The quiver tip is a means of improving bite detection in conjunction with the legering method of fishing, whereby a weighted sinker is attached to the line close to the hook to assist in casting and keep the hook in deep water. A variation of this method is the swim feeder, which is a small weighted container with small openings in which loose groundbait can be placed to diffuse and olfactorily attract more fish in the area towards the hookbait.

== Use ==
On still-water fishing venues after casting, the rod should be placed in a rod rest at a 90-degree angle to the direction of the cast with the tip near to the water to reduce the effects of the wind vibration on the tip. On moving waters such as rivers the rod should be placed on a stand pointing towards the direction of the cast with the tip high in the air in order to reduce the impact of the water flow on the line. The line between the end of the tip and the weight/swim feeder should be tensioned so that a slight bend in the quiver tip exists.

The reason for this is to allow for the detection of two types of bite.

The first type of bite occurs when the fish takes the bait and moves away from the fisherman, causing the line to tighten and pull on the quiver tip. The second type of bite occurs when the fish takes the bait and moves towards the fisherman causing the line to slacken and the quiver tip to drop back/straighten.

== Types ==
Quiver tips are, relative to the rods which hold them, inexpensive and found in all coarse fishing tackle shops. They can be bought in various test curves, which correspond to how stiff the tip is (often measured in ounces.) The lower the test curve, the less stiff the tip is (i.e. the less weight required to bend the tip.) The test curve of the tip should be carefully considered as it could drastically impact on the bite detection/playing of the fish and should relate to the type of fish targeted and weather conditions.

As a general rule, it is desirable to fish with the lightest tip possible; that means the tip with the lightest test curve. This is because the lighter and more flexible the tip, the more sensitive and accurate the bite detection it provides.

One of the basic skills in quiver tip fishing is selecting the correct weight of the tip to match the target fish, having regard to the type of water and the prevailing weather conditions. For example, if British roach are being targeted on a still water in flat calm conditions, a quiver tip of a test curve of no more than an ounce would be a good choice. Alternatively, fishing for a strong aggressive fish like the British barbel in a fast-flowing river would require a heavier tip, possibly of three ounces or more - a lighter tip would be permanently bent round by the flow of the water, eliminating bite detection, and playing a strong fish would probably break it completely.
