= Bottom fishing =

Fishing of the bottom of a deep body of water

Bottom fishing, also called ledgering in the United Kingdom, is fishing of the bottom (demersal zone) of a deep body of water such as lake or ocean, targeting groundfish such as sucker fish, bream, catfish and crappie. It is contrasted with conventional angling in that no float is used with the fishing line.

== Gears ==
A common rig for bottom fishing is a weighted tackle called sinker, which is tied to the end of the fishing line, and a baited hook about an inch up line from the weight. Sometimes the sinker can be replaced by a cage- or keg-like feeder which contains and releases groundbait to better attract fish. The method can be used both with handlining and rod fishing, and can be done both from boats and from the land. The weight can also be used to cast the line to a further, more appropriate distance at deeper water away from the shoreline.

Specialized fishing rods called bottom rods or donkas are also commonly used for bottom fishing. Due to the lack of a float to relay underwater status to the surface, a quiver tip (often coupled with a jingle bell) is used to signal the fisherman about whether the fish has successfully taken the hook.

The objective for rigs used for bottom fishing is to take your bait to the bottom of the water and lure in the fish. The bait must appear appetizing to the fish. The most common rig used in bottom fishing is called a "fish finder rig". The next rig is called a "porgy rig" for the reason that it is effective on porgies, grunts, snapper, and any other schooling, medium-sized fish. A rig that is rarely used is called a "break-away rig". The final rig is called a "party boat rig" because you will see it on almost every party.

== Other meaning ==
In stock market terminology, bottom fishing can mean buying the cheapest investments (in terms of valuation ratios) available. Bottom fishing is value investing concentrated on the very cheapest companies. The term can be derogatory as it can imply a lack of attention to the quality of the investments selected.

In stock trading, bottom fishing can also describe the practice of driving the price of a security lower in order to trigger stop-loss orders, which will then commonly drive a security's price even lower, at which point the person or entity responsible for the triggering will then buy up those shares. As part of this phenomenon, a security's price will then often rise again quickly above the stop-loss order mark.

== See also ==
- Bottom trawling
- Bottom feeder
- Fishing dredge
