= Casting at the 2005 World Games – Women's fly accuracy =

Casting women's fly accuracy at the 2005 World Games
- Venue: Sportpark Wedau, Duisburg, Germany
- Date: 22–24 July 2005
- Competitors: 12 from 6 nations

Medalists
gold medal	(Germany) Jana Maisel
silver medal	(Austria) Alena Zinner
bronze medal	(Poland) Monika Talar

The women's fly accuracy competition in casting at the 2005 World Games took place from 22 to 24 July 2005 at the Sportpark Wedau in Duisburg, Germany.

== Competition format ==
A total of 12 athletes entered the competition. Best six athletes from preliminary round qualifies to the semifinal. From semifinal the best three athletes advances to the final.

== Results ==
=== Preliminary ===
			Round 1		Round 2		Note
Rank	Athlete	Nation	Score	Time	Score	Time	Note
1	Jana Maisel	Germany	95	2:46.59	100	2:24.72	Q
2	Zuzana Kočířová	Czech Republic	100	3:09.00	95	3:10.04	Q
3	Anke Jahn	Germany	95	3:28.00	100	3:56.45	Q
4	Monika Talar	Poland	100	3:06.88	90	3:24.90	Q
5	Alena Zinner	Austria	90	2:54.47	95	2:33.81	Q
6	Jana Brončková	Czech Republic	90	4:28.00	95	4:24.22	Q
7	Kathrin Ernst	Germany	90	2:58.54	85	2:57.72	
8	Iwona Bialik	Poland	80	3:27.00	80	3:56.47	
9	Zuzana Emberová	Slovakia	80	4:20.00	75	4:36.13	
10	Sabine Steinberger	Austria	85	2:57.65	55	3:22.37	
11	Lucia Jankovicová	Slovakia	75	4:08.00	65	4:26.26	
12	Ugnė Gabija Svirbutavičiūtė	Lithuania	65	3:58.58	45	4:25.54	

=== Semifinal ===
Rank	Athlete	Nation	Score	Time	Note
1	Alena Zinner	Austria	100	2:45.88	Q
2	Jana Maisel	Germany	95	2:28.20	Q
3	Monika Talar	Poland	85	2:46.64	Q
4	Anke Jahn	Germany	85	3:10.19	
5	Jana Brončková	Czech Republic	85	3:49.38	
6	Zuzana Kočířová	Czech Republic	80	2:34.03	

=== Final ===
Rank	Athlete	Nation	Score	Time
1st place, gold medalist(s)	Jana Maisel	Germany	95	2:02.19
2nd place, silver medalist(s)	Alena Zinner	Austria	95	2:38.34
3rd place, bronze medalist(s)	Monika Talar	Poland	90	2:34.03
