= Angling =

Fishing technique

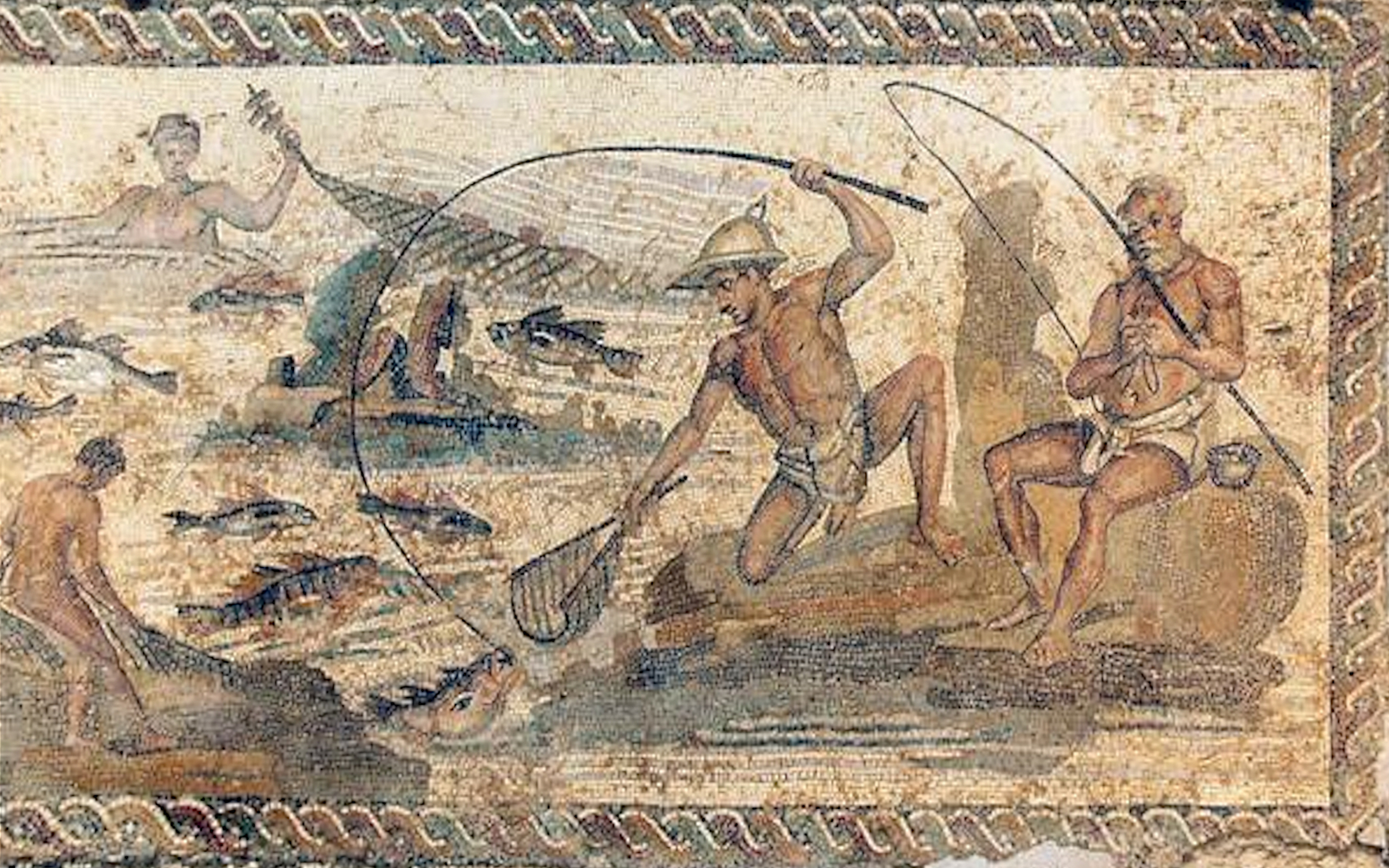
Angling in the 1st century CE. Villa of the Nile Mosaic, Lepcis Magna, Tripoli National Museum.

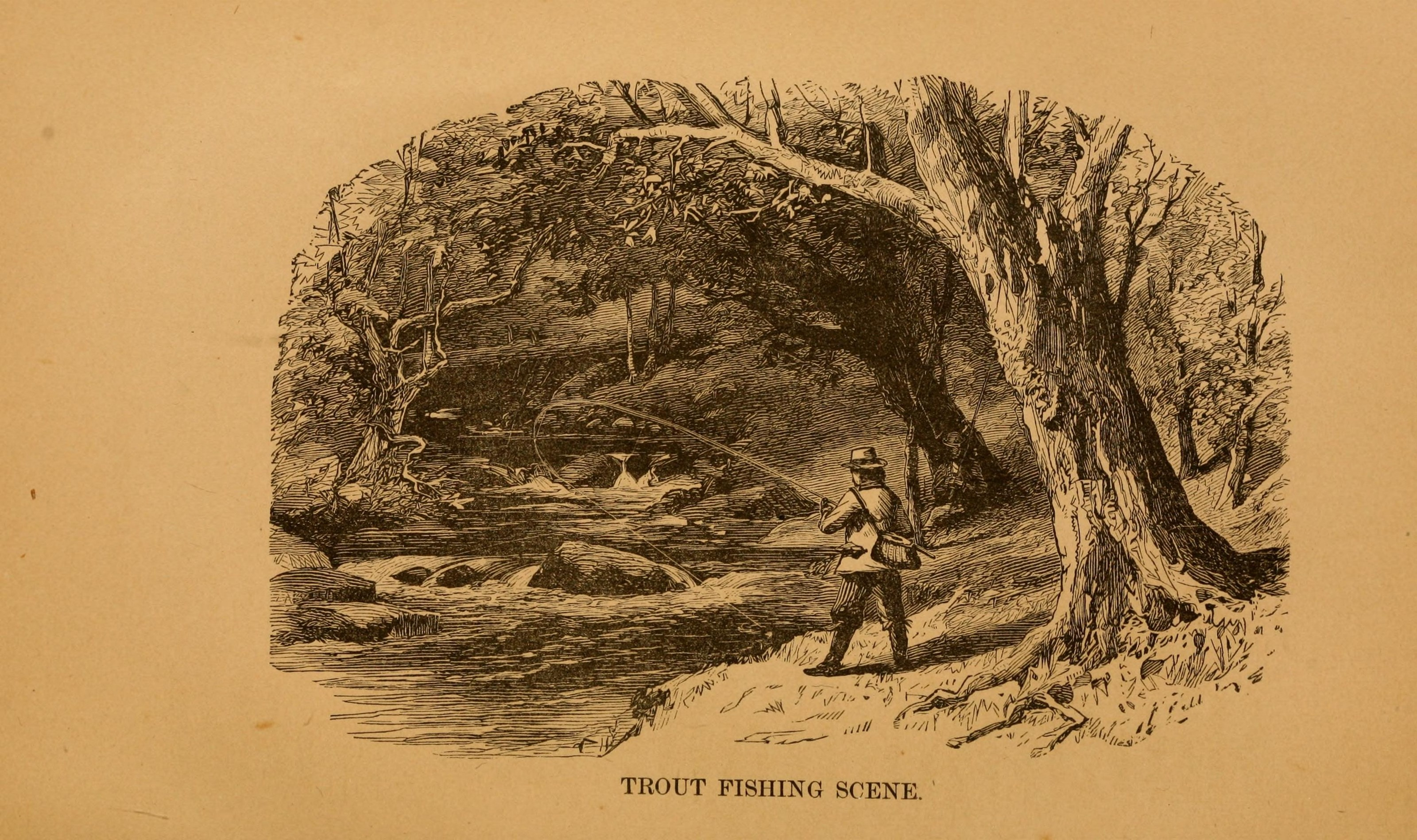
Angling with a rod

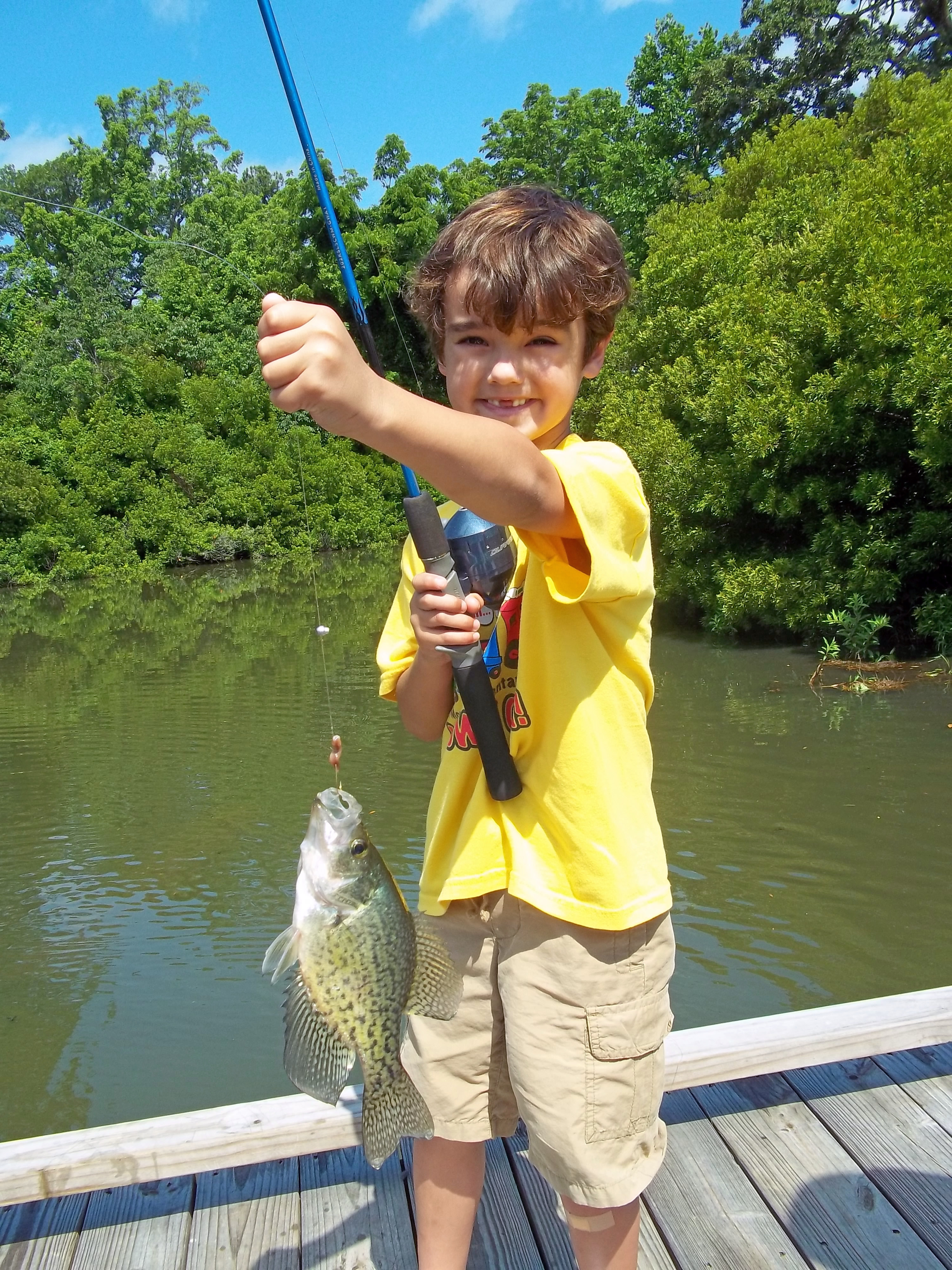
A young angler who has successfully hooked a black crappie in the mouth

Angling (from Old English angol, meaning "hook") is a fishing technique that uses a fish hook attached to a fishing line to tether individual fish in the mouth. The fishing line is usually manipulated with a fishing rod, although rodless techniques such as handlining also exist. Modern angling rods are usually fitted with a fishing reel that functions as a cranking device for storing, retrieving and releasing out the line, although Tenkara fishing and traditional cane pole fishing are two rod-angling methods that do not use any reel. The fish hook itself can be additionally weighted with a denser tackle called a sinker, and is typically dressed with an appetizing bait (i.e. hookbait) to attract and entice the fish into swallowing the hook, but sometimes an inedible fake/imitation bait with multiple attached hooks (known as a lure) is used instead of a single hook with edible bait. Some type of bite indicator, such as a float, a bell or a quiver tip, is often used to relay underwater status of the hook to the surface and alert the angler of a fish's presence.

When angling, the fisherman (known as the angler) will first throw the hook (i.e. "cast") to a chosen area of water (i.e. fishing ground), and then patiently wait for fish to approach and devour the hookbait. It is also not uncommon for the angler to scatter some loose bait (groundbait) around the target area before even casting the hook, to better attract distant fish with scents. As most fish feed by suction feeding, if a fish has succumbed to its own feeding instinct and attempts to eat the bait (i.e. a "bite" or "strike"), it typically swallows the baited hook in whole. Once inside, the hook point will likely pierce into and anchor itself inside the fish jaw, gullet or gill, and the fish in turn becomes firmly tethered by the fishing line. Once the fish is hooked (often colloquially called "fish-on"), any struggles and attempts to escape will pull along the line, causing the bite indicator to signal the angler, who jerks the fishing rod back to further deepen the hook anchorage (i.e. "setting the hook") and then tries to retrieve the line back, pulling the fish closer in the process. During the line retrieval, the angler will carefully monitor the line and rod tension to avoid equipment breaking. With stronger and feistier fish, the angler might need to temporarily halt or even reverse the line retrieval to prolong the struggle time and tire out the fish (i.e. "walking" or "playing" the fish), before dragging it near enough to eventually lift it out of the water (known as "landing") for a successful catch. Sometimes a hand net (or "landing net") or a long-handled hook is used to make fetching the fish easier.

Angling is the principal method of recreational fishing, but commercial fisheries also use angling methods such as longlining, trotlining or trolling. In many parts of the world, a fishing licence is mandated for angling and size limits apply to certain species, meaning by law, fish below and/or above a certain size range must be released alive after capture. The popular fish species pursued by anglers, collectively known as game fish, vary with geography. Among the many species of saltwater fish that are angled for sport globally are billfish (swordfish, sailfish and marlin), tuna, trevally and grouper, while cod and sea bass are popular targets in Europe. In North America, the popular freshwater fish species include bass, northern pike/muskellunge, walleye, trout and anadromous salmon, tilapia, channel catfish and panfishes such as crappie, sunfish (e.g. bluegill) and yellow perch. In Europe, Asia and Australasia, freshwater anglers often pursue species such as carp, pike, bream, tench, rudd, roach, European perch, catfish and barbel, many of which are regarded as undesirable "rough fish" in North America. In developed countries, catch and release angling is increasingly practiced by sport fishermen in recent years to conserve the fish stocks and help maintain sustainability of the local fisheries.

Angling is not to be confused with snagging, another fishing technique that also uses line and hook to catch fish. The principal differences between the two techniques are that angling often uses very small hooks and relies on the target fish itself to voluntarily swallow the hook to pierce internally into the fish's mouth; while snagging uses very large, sharp, multi-pointed grappling hooks that actively "claw" and pierce externally into the body/gill of the fish, and hardly ever involves any hookbait. Snagging also inflicts far more mutilating injuries to the fish and makes it very difficult to heal and survive even if the fish is released alive or manages to escape the snag.

== Tackles ==
=== Rod ===
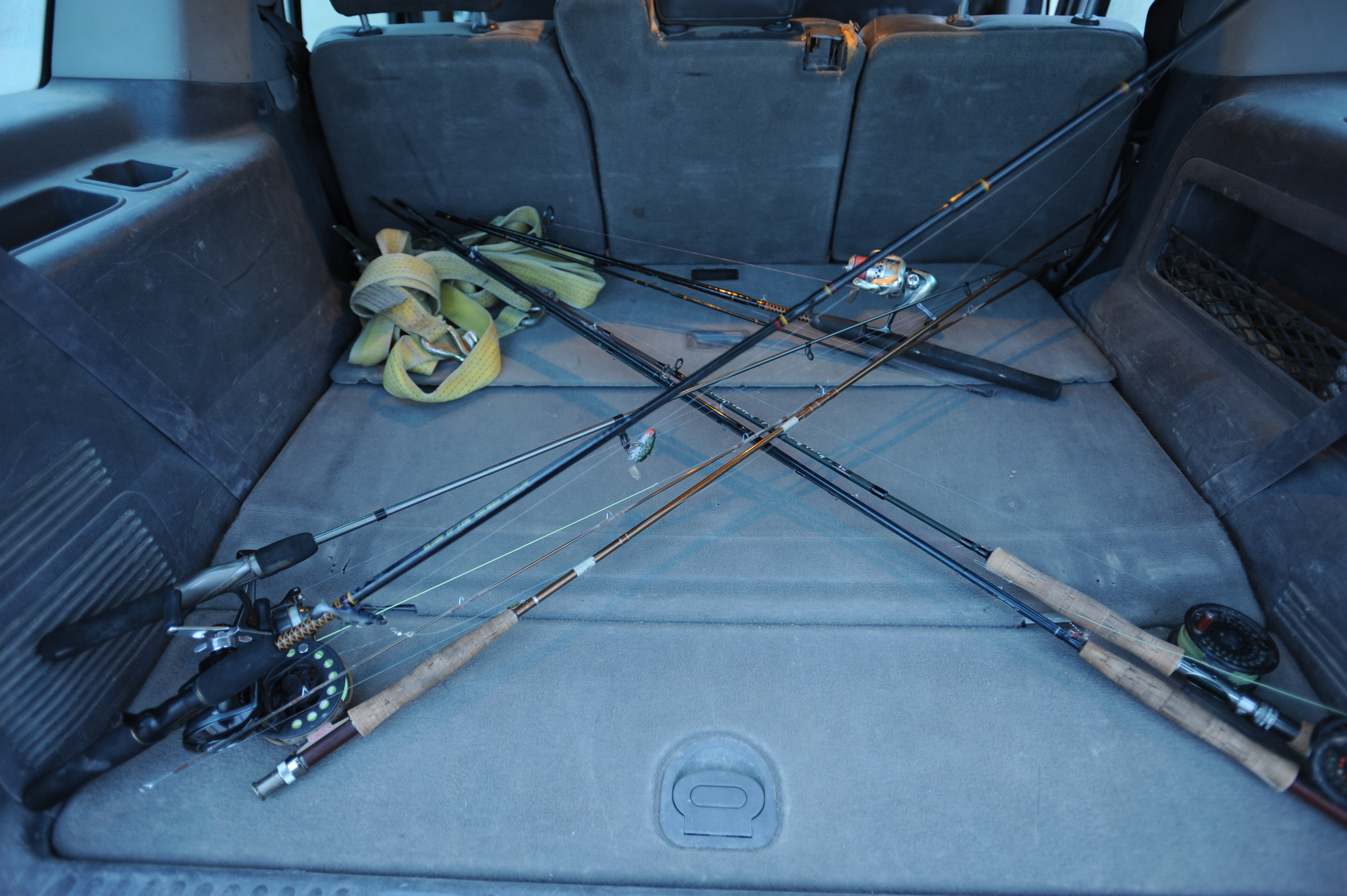
Fishing rods

A fishing rod is a long, thin stick/pole that acts as an extended lever and allows the angler to amplify line movements while luring and pulling the fish. It also enhances casting distance by lengthening the swing radius (compared to that of a human arm) and increasing the launch speed of the terminal tackles (the hook, bait/lure, and other co-launched attachments such as float and sinker/feeder). Traditional fishing rods are made from single piece of hardwood (e.g. ash and hickory) or bamboo, while contemporary rods are usually made from alloys (e.g. aluminium) or more often high-tensile composite materials such as fibreglass or carbon fiber, and newer rod designs are often constructed from hollow blanks to increase the specific strength and reduce the overall weight. Modern rods also may come in multi-piece or telescoping forms, which are more portable and storage-friendly.

==== Types of Rods ====
Fishing rods are categorized based on the rod's intended use. The type of reel and/or the fishing technique being utilized will determine which type of rod a fisherman selects. The design and ergonomics of each rod type optimize them for the intended method of use.

Types of fishing rods include:

- Spinning Rods
- Casting Rods
- Fly Rods
- Cane Pole Rods
- Ice Fishing Rods
- Auto-Setting Rods

=== Reel ===
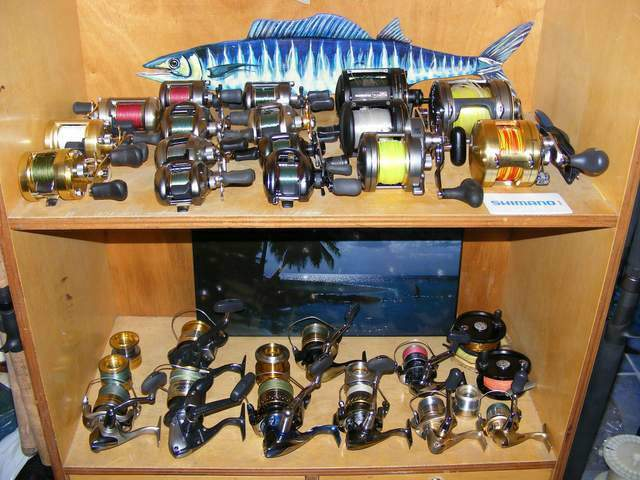
A collection of fishing reels

Fishing reels are manually cranked reels typically mounted onto a fishing rod, used to wind and stow fishing line when a long casting distance or a prolonged retrieval is expected. Traditional fishing reels are essentially compact windlasses with a "direct-drive" design, while modern reels since the Industrial Revolution typically are "multiplier" reels that use internal gear trains to gain a higher rotational speed. Most reels made from the latter half of the 20th century onwards have smoother line guides, anti-reverse designs, gear disengagement mechanisms and sophisticated drag and braking adjustments to help casting farther, more accurately and reliably, and to provide optimal pulling forces when retrieving the line.

=== Hook ===
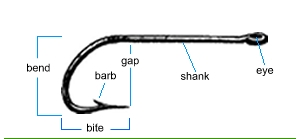
A fish hook

The use of the hook in angling is descended, historically, from what would today be called a gorge. The word "gorge", in this context, comes from the French word meaning "throat". Gorges were used by ancient peoples to capture fish and animals like seal, walrus and birds. A gorge was a long, thin piece of bone or stone attached by its midpoint to a thin line. The gorge would be baited so that it would rest parallel to the lay of the line. When the game would swallow the bait, a tug on the line would cause the gorge to orient itself at right angles to the line, thereby sticking in the fish or animal's throat or gullet. Gorges evolved into the modern fishing hook which is J-shaped with a loop on one end and a sharp point on the other. Most hooks have a barb near the point to better anchor the point and prevent a fish from unhooking itself while being reeled in. Some laws and regulations require hooks to be barbless, typically to facilitate catch and release. This rule is commonly implemented to protect populations of certain species, as a barbed hook could cause significant collateral lacerations (especially when it penetrates the gill) that can kill a fish even after released alive.

=== Line ===
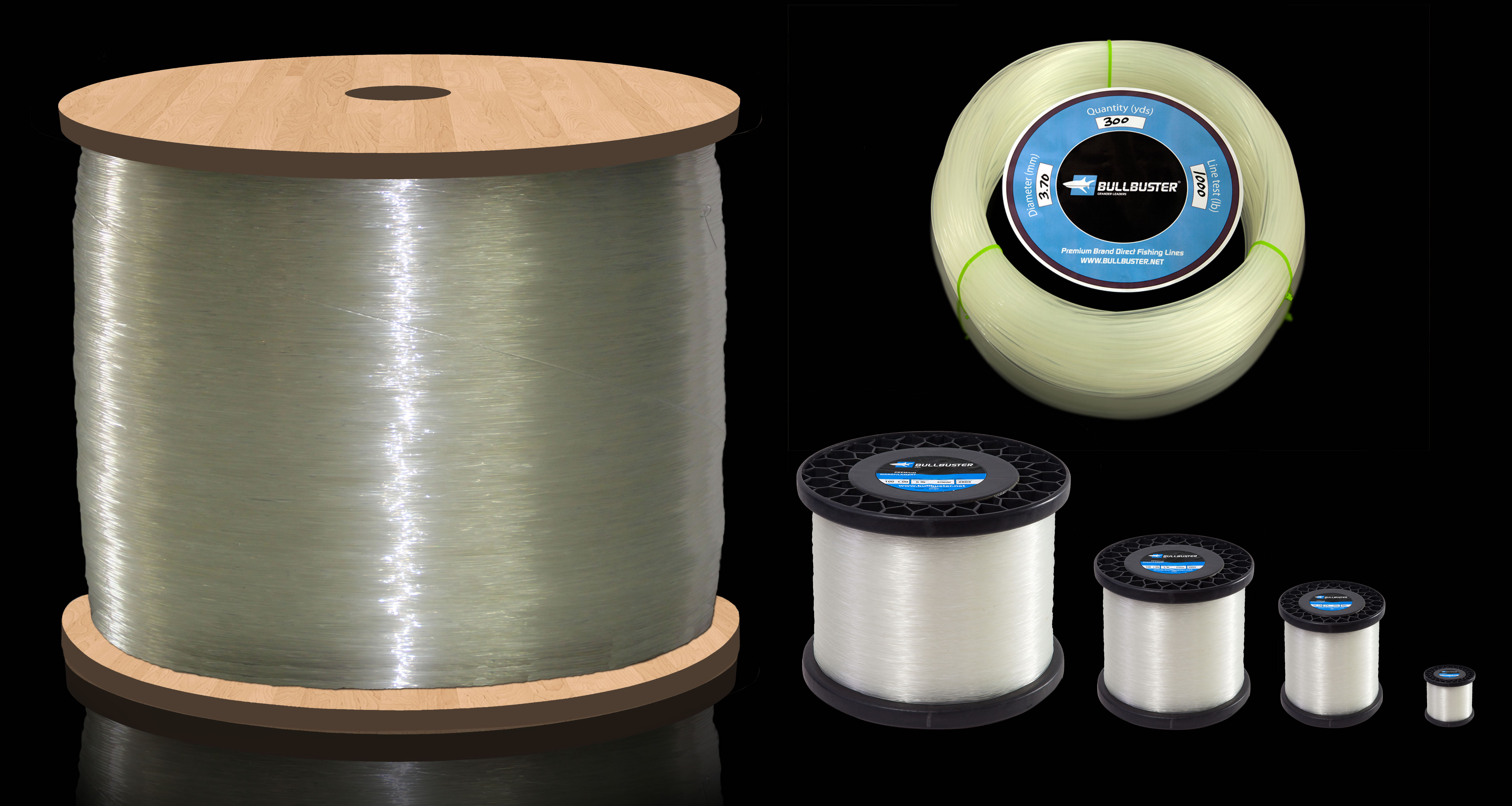
A collection of fishing line stored on spools

Fishing lines are long, ultra-thin, flexible cords that may come in monofilament or braided multifilament forms. Traditional fishing lines are made of silk, while most modern fishing lines are made from synthetic polymers such as nylon, polyethylene, polyvinylidene fluoride ("fluorocarbon") or copolymer materials. Important specifications for a fishing line include its material and forms, test weight, diameter, stretch, memory, abrasion resistance, UV resistance, and reflective and/or refractive visibility.

=== Bite indicator ===
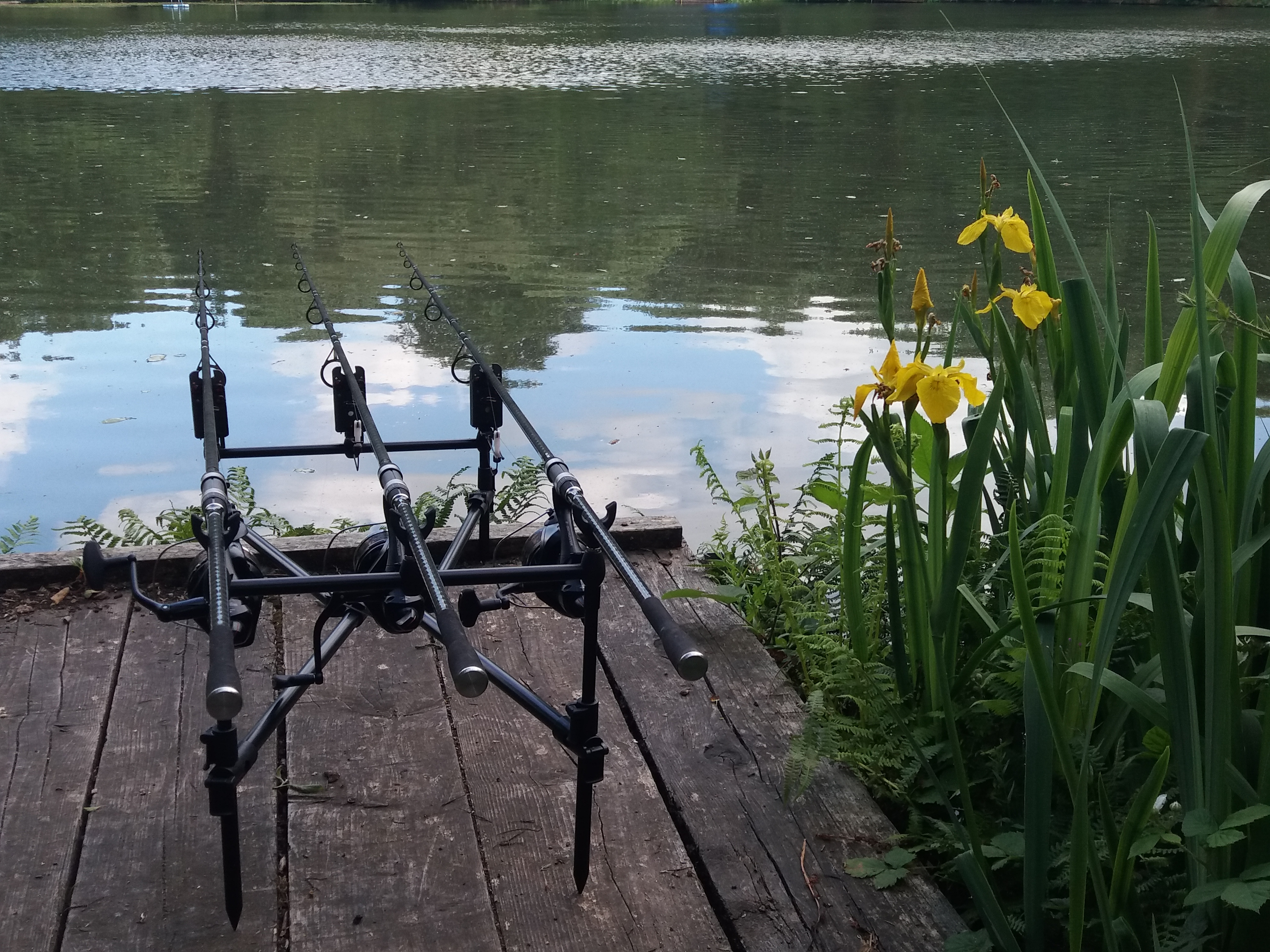
Electronic bite alarms in the form of a rod holder rack

A bite indicator is any device that can help to notify the angler that the hook has been swallowed by a fish. There are many types of bite indicators, the oldest and most ubiquitously used being the fishing float, a lightweight marker buoy that floats at the water surface with the hook and bait suspended below it. When the fish swallows the hook, the leader line between the hook and the float pulls the float deeper into the water, causing it to oscillates in and out of water in a bobbing-like fashion (hence its American English name, the "bobber").

Other bite indicators used in angling include:

- Fishing bell — an (often plastic) bulldog clip attached to a pair of small jingle bells, used often in surf fishing and bank fishing involving rod holders. When clipped onto the fishing rod, the bells will rattle when vibrations are transmitted onto the rod from the fishing line, and the sound can alert the angler.
- Quiver tip — a (typically removable) elastic extension to the distal end of the fishing rod, used in bottom fishing (which does not use floats) and often in conjunction with fishing bells. As the name suggests, the more flexible tip extension will amplify any vibration transmitted from the line to the rod, allowing the angler to see the tip "quiver" and be alerted to any changes along the line.
- Bite alarm – an electronic alarm device comprising a buzzer and a vibration sensor that is placed in close contact with the fishing rod and/or line, designed to give off a bleep sound each time the line is tugged. Bite alarms come in different sizes and forms, from compact devices that clips onto the rod like a fishing bell, to large multi-rod holder racks with different bleep tone and sound quality settings. Some bite alarms also incorporate LED lighting that can visually indicate in addition to the sound alert, in case the angler happens to temporarily wander away from the rod and cannot hear the sound clearly.

== Baits ==
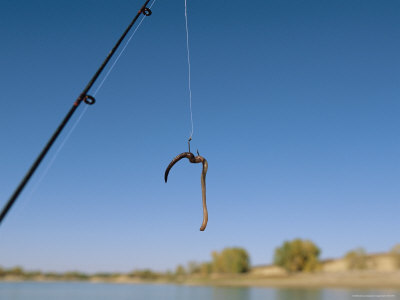
Earthworm hookbait

In angling, two broad types of baits are used: groundbait, which is thrown separately into the water in large quantities as an "appetizer" to olfactorily attract distant fish nearer to the angler's position; and hookbait, which is directly attached to the fish hook to entice the fish into swallowing the hook along with the bait. In colloquial usage, the word "bait" refers specifically to hookbaits, which can be further separated into three main categories: natural baits, artificial baits and lures.

The choice of what bait to use is dictated mainly by the target species's diet, the habitat and weather conditions (which can alter the fish's foraging behavior), the angler's own personal preferences, and the local fishery regulations. Using an optimal angling bait can increase the chance of catching the intended fish, while conversely using an inadequate bait will greatly reduce the success rate, especially when there are other bait fishermen nearby.

=== Natural baits ===
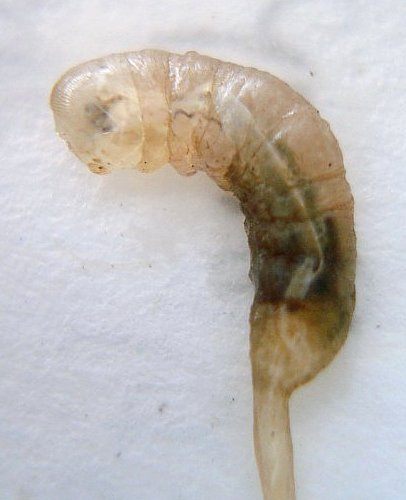
The rat-tailed maggot is a popular fish bait

Natural baits are food items that are present within the target fish's natural diet, which are usually animals at a lower trophic level in the food web. A natural bait angler, with few exceptions, will use a common prey species of the target fish as a bait. The natural bait used may be live food (known as a live bait) or carcass (i.e. dead bait), and a bait improvised from grossly intact portions of a dead animal (e.g. fish head) is known as a cutbait. Common natural baits for both fresh and saltwater fishing include earthworm, leech, insects and larvae, minnow, squid, prawn, crayfish, and even crabs, frogs and salamanders. Natural baits are effective due to the real texture, odour and movements of the bait presented.

The common earthworm is a universal live bait for freshwater angling, and grubs and maggots are also excellent bait when trout fishing. Grasshoppers, crickets, eels and even ants are also used as bait for trout in their season, although many anglers believe that trout or salmon roe is superior to any other bait.

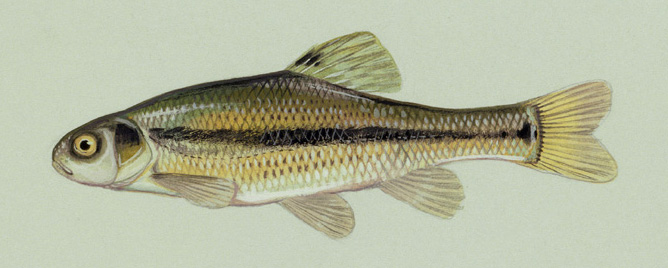
Fathead minnow — a common bait fish

Crayfish, which are preyed upon by a variety of ray-finned fishes, are also commonly used as bait, either live or with only the tail meat. They are popular for catching catfish, largemouth bass, smallmouth bass, striped bass, perch and pike. However, studies had confirmed that introducing crayfish outside of their home range has led to various ecological problems of them becoming invasive species. Transporting crayfish as live bait has also contributed to the spread of zebra mussels, which are known to attach themselves onto crayfish, in various waterways throughout Europe and North America.

==== Spreading diseases ====
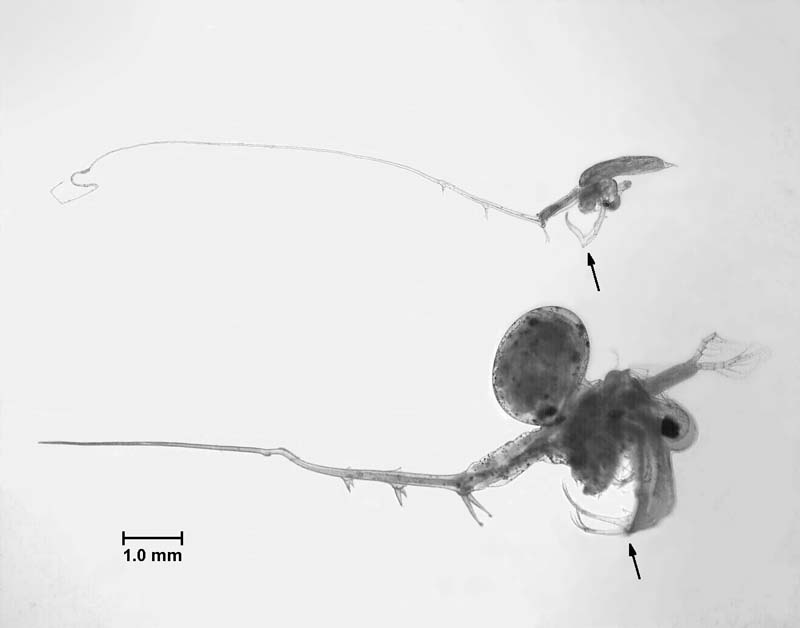
Fishhook waterflea (Cercopagis pengoi), an invasive predatory cladoceran associated with bait fishing

The capture, transportation and culture of bait fish can spread damaging organisms between ecosystems, endangering them. In 2007 several American states enacted regulations designed to slow the spread of fish diseases, including viral hemorrhagic septicemia, by bait fish. Because of the risk of transmitting Myxobolus cerebralis (whirling disease), trout and salmon should not be used as bait.

Anglers may increase the possibility of contamination by emptying bait buckets into fishing venues and collecting or using bait improperly. The transportation of fish from one location to another can break the law and cause the introduction of fish alien to the ecosystem.

=== Artificial baits ===
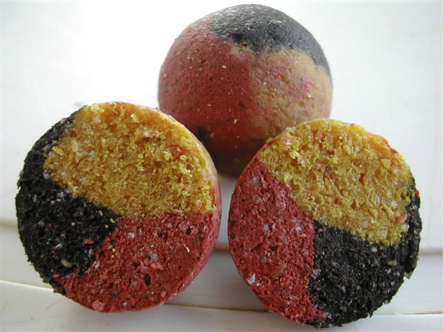
Boilies, a type of commercial artificial bait widely used for carp fishing

Artificial baits are edible baits that are not directly acquired via natural means, but are made from other food materials via some kind of artificial processing. These can be fish food that are either homemade (e.g. dried food paste) or commercially purchased (e.g. boilies and feed pellets), or prepared/processed food such as cutlets, offals, dehulled kernels (e.g. peas and corns), dairy products (cheese and curd), bread or doughballs made from various ingredient mixtures (e.g. rice, semolina, cornmeal, bread crumbs, and fishmeal, etc.), which can be used to attract omnivorous or even herbivorous fish. In lakes in southern climates such as Florida, panfish such as sunfish will even take household wheat bread or pet food as bait. These bread bait is prepared from a small amount of bread, often moistened and softened by saliva, then squeezed into a ball of the bite size of small fish.

=== Lures ===
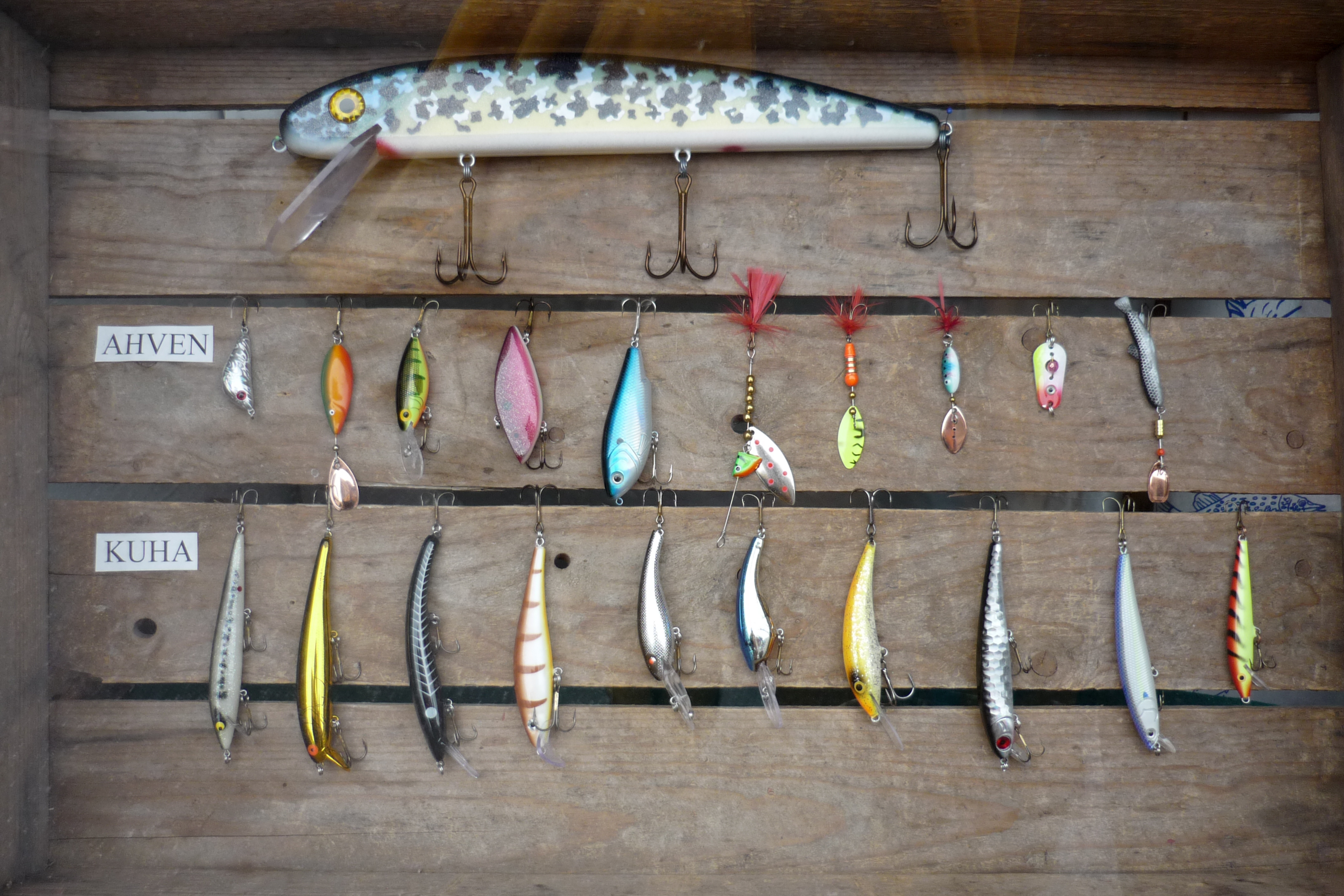
A collection of different fishing lures

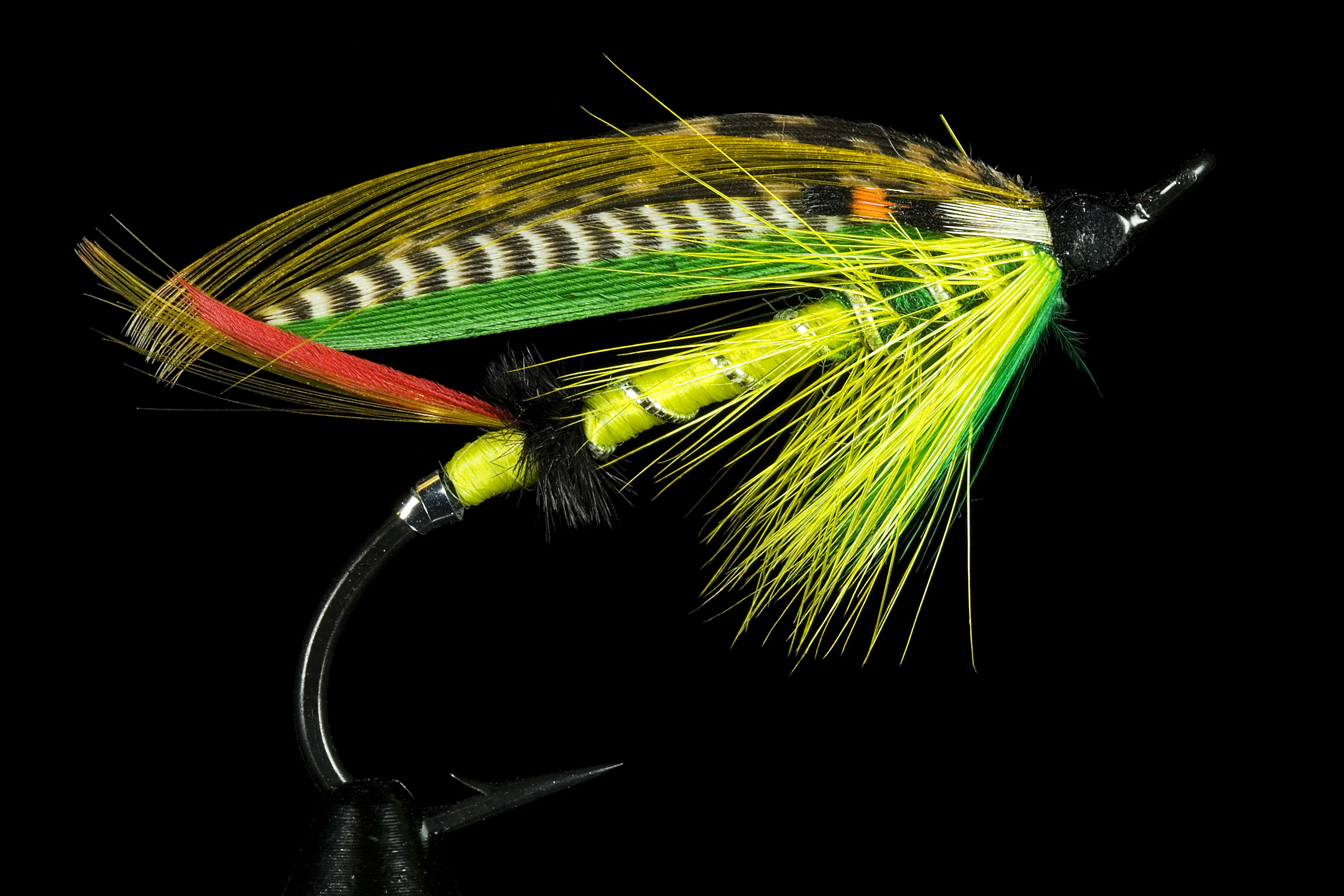
Green Highlander, an artificial fly used for salmon fishing

Some baits are not actual food items but rather just "fake" replicas of food made of inedible materials (e.g. wood, metal, silicone rubber, plastics, etc), and are designed to entice predatory fish to strike by imitating the appearance and motions of real prey (shad, worm, frog, insect, crayfish, etc.). These inedible, replica baits are typically called lures instead of baits, although expressions such as "swimbaits", "crankbaits", "jerkbaits", "spinnerbaits" and "chatterbaits" are still used when describing specific types of lures. Unlike conventional baits, lures typically do not release any scents and rely solely on looks and sounds/vibrations to attract fish, although occasionally chemical attractants (e.g. dimethyl-β-propiothetin) are still used in addition either to impregnate favorable smells or to mask away unwanted plastic smells. Many anglers prefer to fish solely using lures, as these rely more on the user's rod and reel actions to successfully attract fish, and requires frequent casting and retrieving the line, and are thus more interactive and exciting.

Lures can be broadly categorized into hard-body and soft-body lures, although hybrid lures with both hard and soft components are also common. Soft-body lures tend to give a more flexible and realistic "swimming" posture when towed through the water, while hard-body lures usually rely on stirring up more noise and turbulences. Some newer hard lure designs, however, are multi-jointed and can resemble soft lures in dynamics. Soft lures are typically coupled with a single conventional fish hook or a jighead, while hard lures commonly have more than one hook (which are often treble hooks). When lures are used in combination with other terminal tackles (floats, sinkers, swivels, etc.) to produce sophisticated presentations, the entire lure package is known as a rig. Common rigs with a soft plastic lure are the Texas Rig or the Carolina Rig.

Some fishing lures (e.g. spoons and spinnerbaits) may not even resemble any prey in looks, and may require skilled rod movements to impart an enticing presentation to the target fish, for example in jigging and topwater fishing. Some lures, such as the flies used in fly fishing, are ultralight and even require specialized gears and techniques to be cast properly. In modern times, there are also lures that photically attract fish with LED illuminiation, as well as battery-powered "bionic" lures that are essentially primitive robot fish that can swim around without needing to be towed by a fishing line.

== Techniques ==
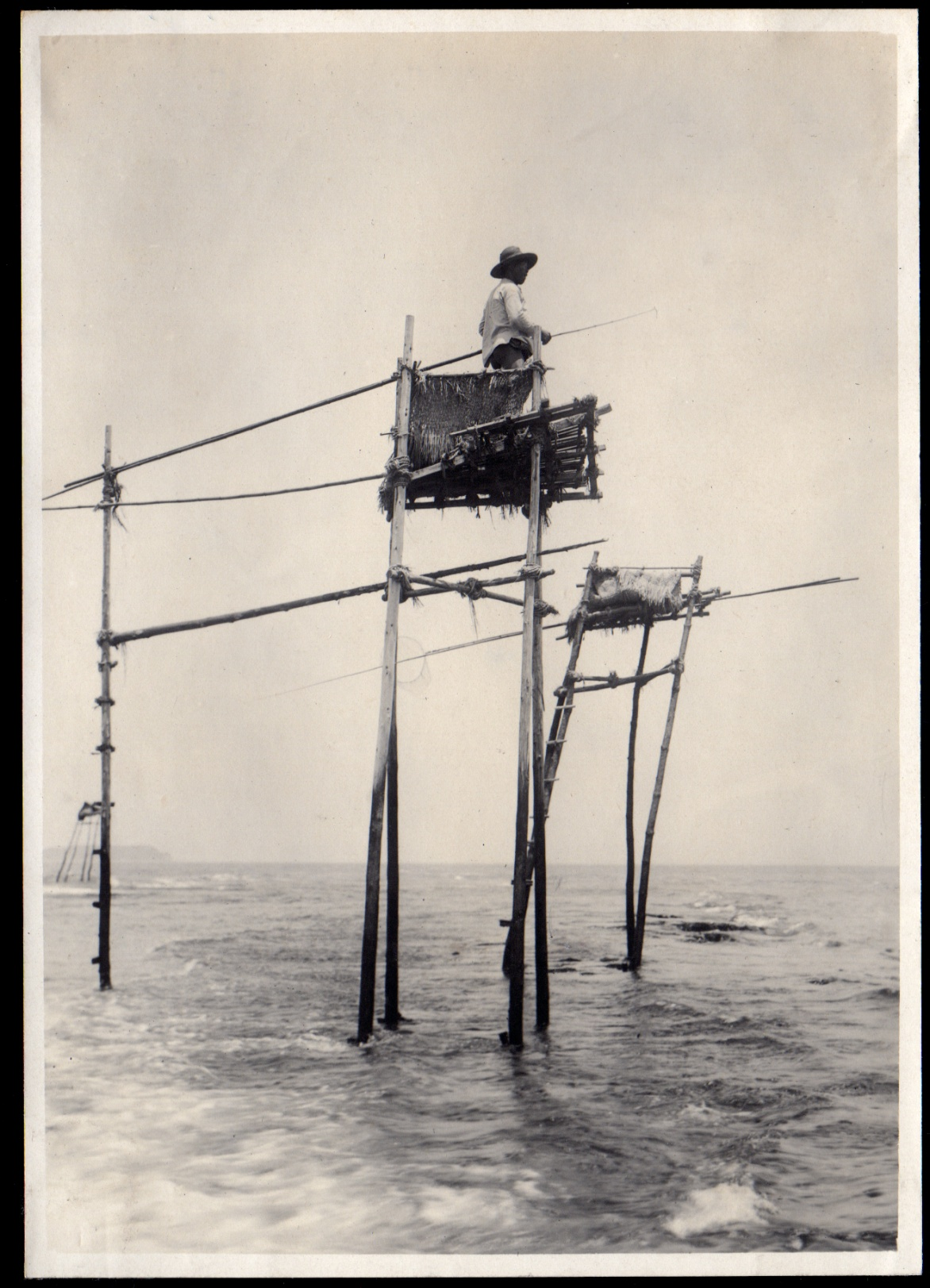
Fishing from platforms. Japan, 1915

=== Bait fishing ===
Although all angling techniques use bait, the term "bait fishing" specifically refers to those that use edible materials (e.g. worms, insects, crustaceans and smaller bait fish) as baits.

=== Lure fishing ===
Lure fishing uses a type of artificial fake bait known as lure, which is usually made from inedible materials such as wood, metal and plastics. Unlike conventional fishing baits, lures do not emit any scent and thus cannot attract fish olfactorily, but instead using prey-like appearances, movements, vibrations, bright reflections and flashy colors to attract and entice carnivorous predatory fish into mistakenly striking. Many lures are equipped with more than one hooks to better the chance of anchoring into the fish's mouth, though some hookless lures are used to bait the fish nearer so it can be captured via other means such as spearing, netting, trapping or capturing by hand. In addition to rod angling, handlining, longlining and commercial trolling also employ lure fishing.

Lure fishing is a popular style of recreational fishing. When fishing, a lure angler will repeatedly cast out the lure afar and then methodically retrieves the line, pulling the lure through the water and creating vibrations, turbulent splashes and/or a popping action in the process, which imitating a small aquatic prey such as a baitfish, a drowning insect or a frog. A skilled angler can explore many possible hiding spots for fish through lure casting such as under logs and on flats. No bite indicator is used, and when the lure catches the attention of a game fish and successfully results in biting/swallowing of the lure, the angler can detect it by watching for splashes and feeling any vibrations, rod bending and changes in line tension. Lure fishing also typically uses relatively lightweight fishing rods coupled with baitcasting reels or spinning reels.

Depending on the style of lure retrieval, lure fishing can roughly be separated into power fishing, which relies on more frequent and vigorous lure retrievals to increase the chance of luring fish; and finesse fishing, which focuses on the more lingered and vivid lure presentation within each cast-retrieval cycle to better entice fish.

==== Jigging ====
===== Slabbing =====
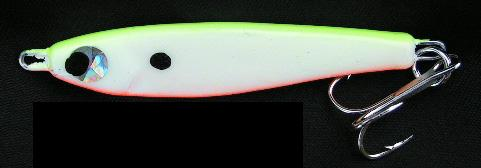
Slab

Slabbing is a type of jigging that involves repetitively lifting and dropping a flat lure, usually made of 1 to 2.5 oz of lead painted to look like a baitfish (or heavy slabs of metal), through a school of actively feeding fish that the angler has located on a fishfinder. It is a bass fishing technique and is used on white and striped bass in the reservoirs of the southern US.

=== Rod fishing ===
Almost all recreational angling activities involve the use of fishing rods, which is used to manipulate the movements of fishing lines and to allow farther casting of baits/lures.

=== Line fishing ===
Although all angling techniques use hook and line, the term "line fishing" specifically refers to those that do not involve using fishing rods. Line fishing is also known as rodless fishing.

==== Handlining ====
Handlining, or handline fishing, is done with a handheld fishing line baited with lures or bait fish. Handlining is the oldest angling technique used by mankind, and can be done from boats or from the shore. It is used mainly to catch groundfish and squid, but smaller pelagic fish can also be caught.

==== Longlining ====
Longlining, or longline fishing, is a commercial fishing technique that uses a long heavy line with a series of hundreds or even thousands of baited hooks hanging from the main line via branch lines called snoods. Longlines are usually operated from specialised boats called longliners, which use a special winch to haul in the line and can operate in deeper waters targeting pelagic species such as swordfish, tuna, halibut and sablefish.

==== Droplining ====
Droplining involves setting a longline vertically down into the water (instead of being more horizontally deployed like longlining) with a series of baited hooks. Droplines are weighted at the bottom and have a float at the top. They are not usually as long as longlines and have fewer hooks, and tend to be stationary.

==== Trotlining ====
Trotlining uses a longline that, instead of being tethered to the water surface only at one end, are fixed at/near the surface at both ends of the longline, with hooked snood lines hanging vertically down along the main line. Trotlines are used for catching crabs or fish (e.g. catfish), particularly across rivers. They can be physically set in many ways, such as tying each end to a fixed structure and span the line across the water in-between like a boom, and adjusting rest of the line with weights and floats.

==== Deadlining ====
Deadlining is the practice of leaving a baited fishing line in the water (with the other end fastened to the bank) and returning later (usually overnight) to check and capture any tethered fish, similar to the use of a snare trap by hunters.

=== Float fishing ===
Float fishing is the most common method of angling, defined by the use of a compact light buoy attached to fishing line – known as a float (or "bobber" in the United States) — as the bite indicator. Due to buoyancy, the float remains at the water surface and suspends the baited hook at a predetermined depth. It can also drift in the prevailing current and carry the hook to areas of water otherwise inaccessible by casting alone. When the fish bites and swallows the hook, the float visually signals any forces exerted on the leader line below it, as the fisherman can then see it being pulled underwater and/or sideways.

=== Bottom fishing ===
Bottom fishing, also called legering in the United Kingdom, uses a weighted tackle called a sinker tied to the end of the fishing line to keep the baited hook close to the bottom of the water, to target groundfishes such as sucker, bream, catfish and crappie. The sinker can also be used to add momentum to the hook and help casting the line to a further distance. The method can be used both with handlining and rod fishing, and can be done both from boats and from the land. Specialized fishing rods called "donkas" are also commonly used for bottom fishing, and a quiver tip (sometimes coupled with a jingle bell) is used instead as the bite indicator.

Some sinkers are replaced by feeders, which is designed to contain and release groundbaits to help attract fish towards the hook.

=== Trolling ===
Trolling is a method of fishing where one or more fishing lines, baited with lures or bait fish, are drawn through the water at a consistent, low speed. It can be rod fishing or line fishing.

Rod trolling is a technique in which fishing rods function as improvised outriggers to tow the baits/lures through the water, usually behind or beside a moving boat with the rod fixated to the gunwale. It can also be done by very slowly winding the line in (like finesse lure fishing) or even sweeping the line sideways, with the angler operating the rod from a static position (e.g. atop a jetty, pier or bridge).

Rodless trolling is a technique in which one or more baited lines are drawn through the water behind a slow moving fishing boat. The boat is usually equipped with outriggers, downriggers and trolling motors. Rodless trolling is typically used in commercial fishing, and is used to catch economic pelagic fish such as mackerel and kingfish.

==== Pahlia ====
Pahila (lit. "pulled") is a Filipino traditional shoreline trolling, uniquely using baited hooks tied to a laterally flattened float called palyaw, which is shaped like a small outrigger boat, a catamaran or a fish. A longline is attached to the float, and set unto the water's edge and dragged by someone running or walking along the beach. The combination of the water resistance and the diagonal pull forces the float outwards into deeper waters, like a kite. Once the line reaches its maximum line length, it moves rapidly parallel to the person pulling it along the beach, and is pulled back to the shore intermittently to check for catches. It is also called subid-subid, sibid-sibid, paguyod, pahinas, hilada, or saliwsiw, among other names, in other Philippine languages.

=== Drift fishing ===
Drift fishing is a fishing technique in which the line is not actively reeled and the bait/lure is allowed to drift and react freely to the turbulences in the water current, much like how a tethered kite would behave in a wind gust. It is usually done from an unpowered boat in faster-flowing waters.

== Laws and regulations ==
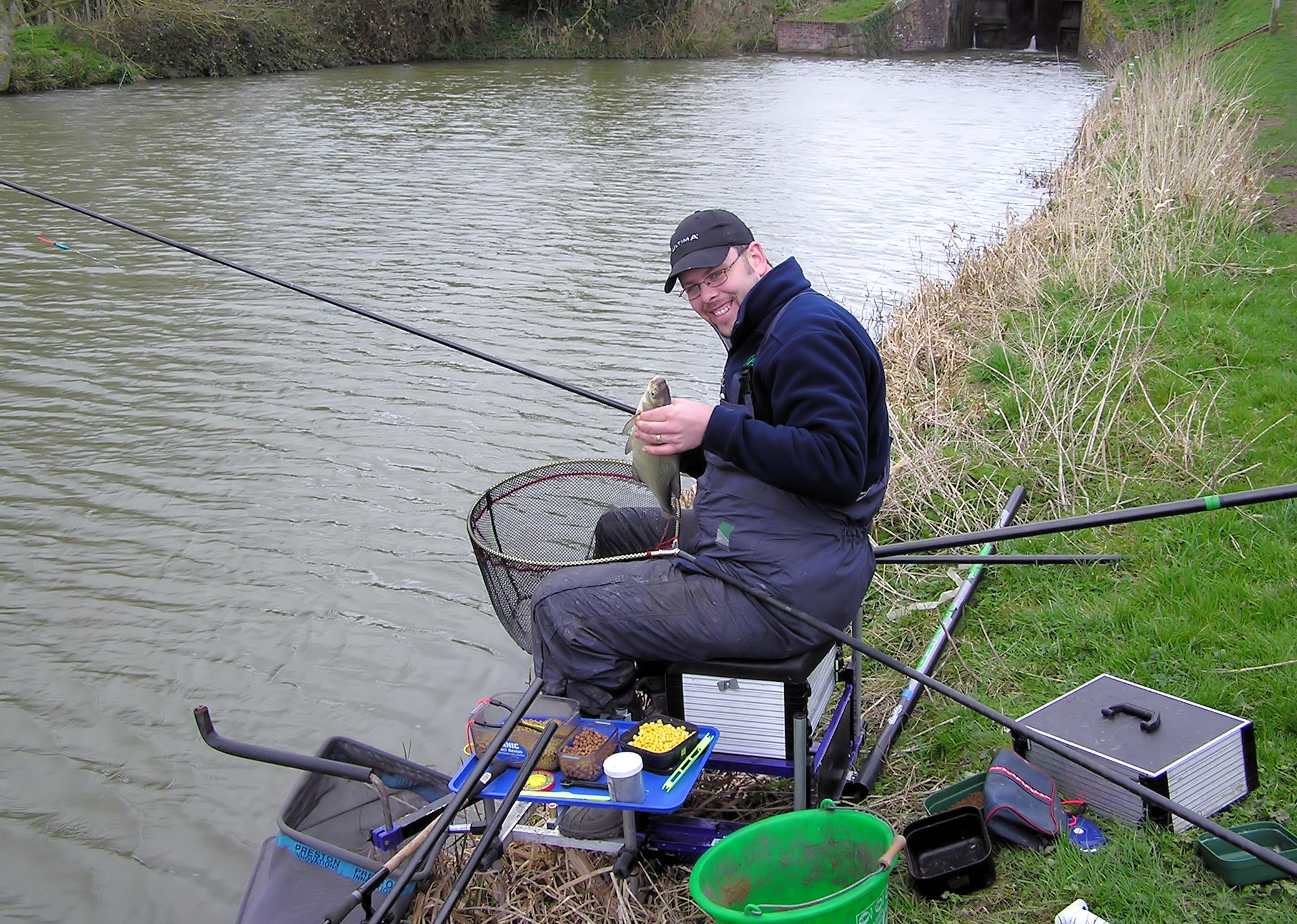
An angler on the Kennet and Avon Canal, England, with his fishing tackle

Laws and regulations managing angling vary greatly, often regionally, within countries. These commonly include permits (licences), closed periods (seasons) where specific species are unavailable for harvest, restrictions on gear types, and quotas.

Laws generally prohibit catching fish with hooks other than in the mouth (i.e. snagging, or "foul hooking" and "jagging") or the use of nets and hand hooks other than as an aid in landing a captured fish. Some species, such as bait fish, may be taken with nets, and a few for food. Sometimes, non-sport fish are considered of lesser value and it may be permissible to take them by methods like snagging, bow and arrow or spearing, none of which fall under the definition of angling since they do not rely upon the use of a hook and line.

=== Fishing seasons ===
Fishing seasons are set by countries or localities to indicate what kinds of fish may be caught during sport fishing (also known as angling) for a certain period of time. Fishing seasons are enforced (usually by water police) to maintain ecological balance and to protect species of fish during their spawning period during which they are easier to catch and more physiologically vulnerable.

=== Slot limits ===
Slot limits prohibit the harvest of fish where the measured lengths (from the snout to the end of the tail fin) fall within a protected interval. These are put in action to help protect certain fish (usually juvenile) in a given area. They generally require anglers to release captured fish if they fall within a given size range, allowing anglers to keep only smaller (though rare) or larger fish. Slot limits vary from water to water depending on what local officials believe would produce the best outcome for managing fish populations.

Individual fishing quota (IFQ), also known as individual transferable quota (ITQ), is a kind of catch share that sets a species-specific total allowable catch (TAC), typically by weight and for a given time period. A dedicated portion of the TAC (called "quota share") is then allocated to individual fishermen, and can typically be transferable (i.e. bought, sold or leased). As of 2008, 148 major fisheries (generally, a single species in a single fishing ground) around the world had adopted some variant of this approach, along with approximately 100 smaller fisheries in individual countries. Approximately 10% of the marine harvest was managed by ITQs as of 2008. The first countries to adopt individual fishing quotas were the Netherlands, Iceland and Canada in the late 1970s, and the most recent is the United States Scallop General Category IFQ Program in 2010 The first country to adopt individual transferable quotas as a national policy was New Zealand in 1986.

=== Minimum landing size ===
The minimum landing size (MLS) is the smallest fish measurement at which it is legal for the fisherman to keep a captured fish. The MLS depends on the species of fish, and allowed sizes also vary around the world, as they are legal definitions which are defined by the local regulatory authority.

The idea behind this limitation is that only the older, more mature adult fish get taken, leaving growing juveniles behind to continue breeding and propagating their species. There is some criticism of this legal requirement, however, as it applies artificial selection pressure to the fish population (see Fisheries-induced evolution) unless the anglers voluntarily practise catch and release indiscriminate of sizes. As larger fish (whose survival has been more successful so far) get taken out of the population, the genes for larger size are reduced or removed from the gene pool, while fish that mature at a smaller size survive longer to continue breeding, and the average size of fish stock shrinks over time. This has led to a collapse in the amount of catchable fish in some fisheries.

== Catch and release ==
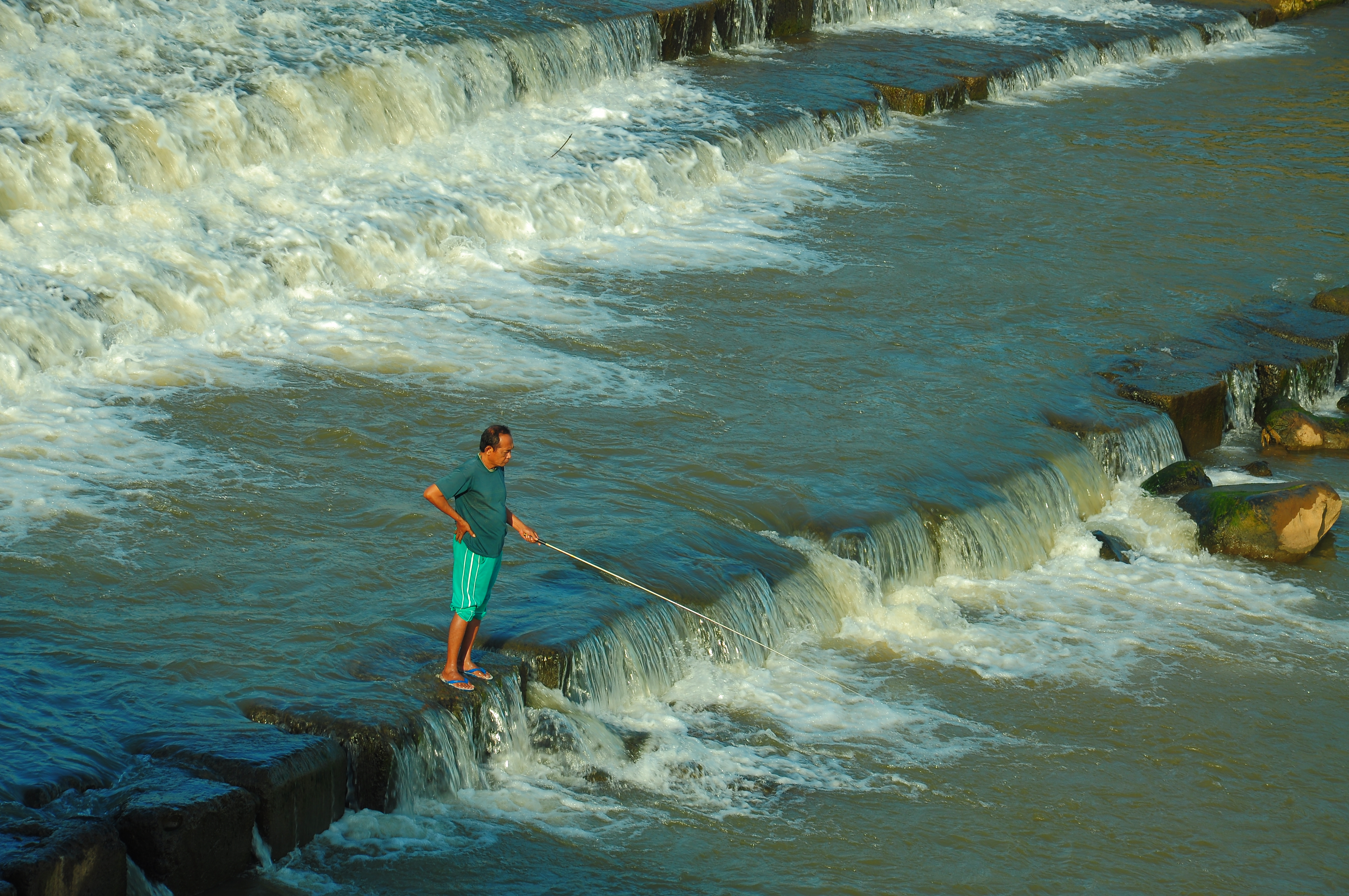
An angler is fishing in the middle of the river when the water is receding in Central Java, Indonesia

Although most anglers keep their catch for consumption, catch and release fishing is increasingly practiced, especially by fly anglers. The general principle is that releasing fish allows them to survive, thus avoiding unintended depletion of the population. For species such as marlin, muskellunge, and bass, there is a cultural taboo among anglers against taking them for food. In many parts of the world, size limits apply to certain species, meaning fish below a certain size must, by law, be released. It is generally believed that larger fish have a greater breeding potential. Some fisheries have a slot limit that allows the taking of smaller and larger fish, but requiring that intermediate sized fish be released. It is generally accepted that this management approach will help the fishery create a number of large, trophy-sized fish. In smaller fisheries that are heavily fished, catch and release is the only way to ensure that catchable fish will be available from year to year. The practice of catch and release is criticised by some who consider it unethical to inflict pain upon a fish for purposes of sport. Some of those who object to releasing fish do not object to killing fish for food. Adherents of catch and release dispute this charge, pointing out that fish commonly feed on hard and spiky prey items, and as such can be expected to have tough mouths, and also that some fish will re-take a lure they have just been hooked on, a behaviour that is unlikely if hooking were painful. Opponents of catch and release fishing would find it preferable to ban or to severely restrict angling. On the other hand, proponents state that catch-and-release is necessary for many fisheries to remain sustainable, is a practice that generally has high survival rates, and consider the banning of angling as not reasonable or necessary.

In some jurisdictions, in the Canadian province of Manitoba, for example, catch and release is mandatory for some species such as brook trout. Many of the jurisdictions which mandate the live release of sport fish also require the use of artificial lures and barbless hooks to minimise the chance of injury to fish. Mandatory catch and release also exists in the Republic of Ireland where it was introduced as a conservation measure to prevent the decline of Atlantic salmon stocks on some rivers. In Switzerland, catch and release fishing is considered inhumane and was banned in September 2008.

Barbless hooks, which can be created from a standard hook by removing the barb with pliers or can be bought, are sometimes resisted by anglers because they believe that increased fish escapes. Barbless hooks reduce handling time, thereby increasing survival. Concentrating on keeping the line taut while fighting fish, using recurved point or "triple grip" style hooks on lures, and equipping lures that do not have them with split rings can significantly reduce escapement.

== Tournaments and derbies ==
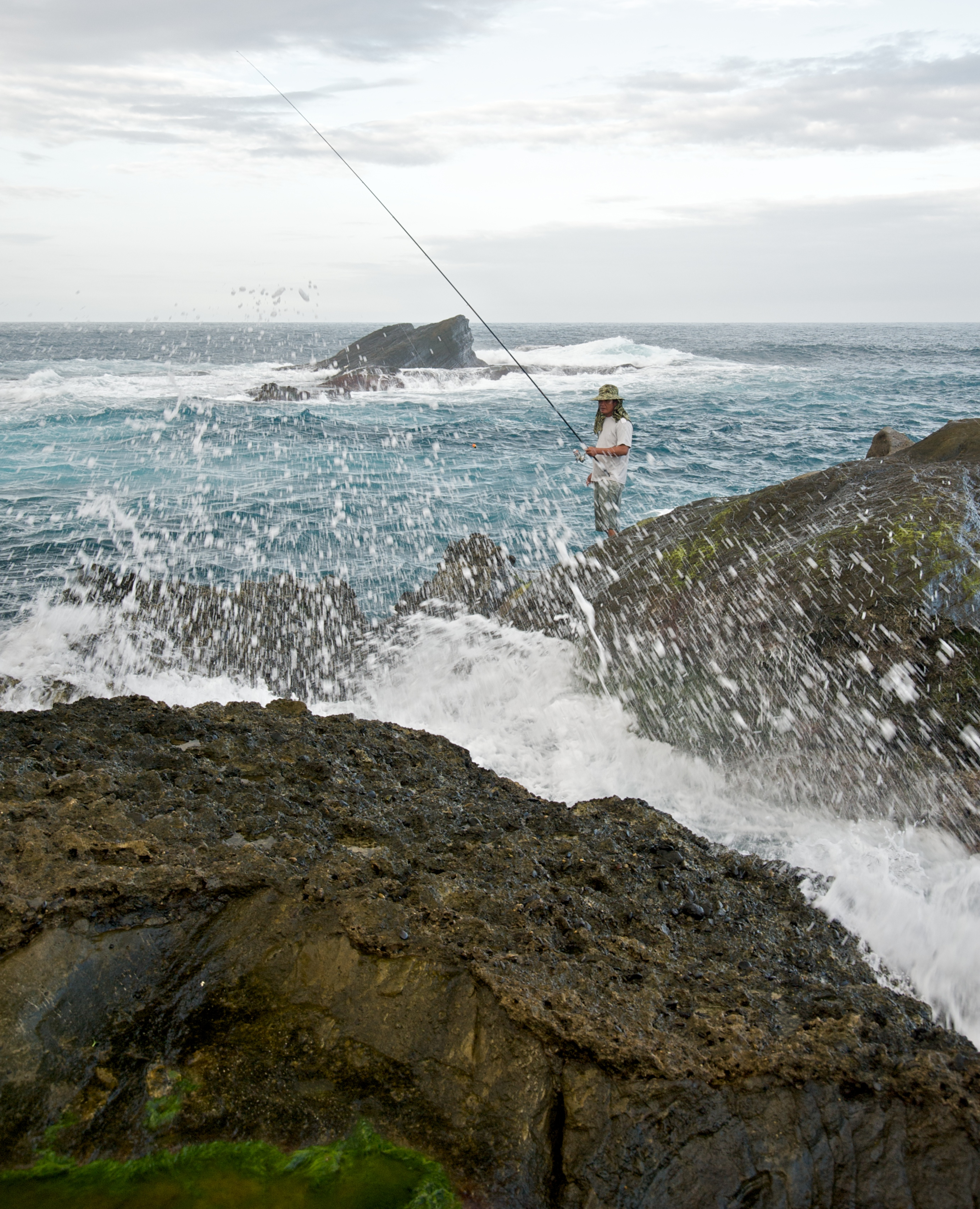
Angling at Shihtiping in Taiwan

Angling is also practiced in fishing tournaments, where contestants compete for prizes based on the total length or weight of a fish, usually of a pre-determined species, caught within a specified time. These contests originated as local fishing contests and have evolved to include large competitive circuits, with professional anglers that are supported by commercial endorsements. Professional anglers may gain cash prizes for placing well in tournaments. Similar competitive fishing exists at the amateur level with fishing derbies. In general, derbies can be distinguished from tournaments; derbies normally require fish to be killed, as opposed to tournaments, where points are normally deducted if fish can not be released alive.

== Motivation ==
A ten-year-long survey of US fishing club members, completed in 1997, indicated that motivations for recreational angling have shifted from personal leisure, outdoor exercise, experiencing nature and thrill of the catch, to the importance of family time and social bonding via recreational fishing. Anglers with higher family incomes went fishing more frequently and were less concerned about obtaining fish as food.

A German study indicated that satisfaction derived from angling was not dependent on the actual catch, but depended more on the angler's expectations of the experience.

A 2006 study by the Louisiana Department of Wildlife and Fisheries tracked the motivations of anglers on the Red River. Among the most often stated responses were the fun of catching fish, the experience, to catch a lot of fish or a very large fish, for challenge, and adventure. Use as food was not investigated as a motive.

== See also ==
- Artisanal fishing – Traditional labor-intensive fishing
- Bamboo fly rods – Fly fishing rod made of split bamboo
- Bibliography of fly fishing – List of English language works on the sport of fly fishing
- Gaff – Hooked pole for pulling fish out of water
- Piscatorial Society – Angling society in England
- Recreational fishing – Fishing as a hobby
- Rock fishing – Sea fishing from rocky outcrops
- Tailrace fishing – Angling below water restrictions
- Trolling (fishing) – Practice of fishing by drawing a baited line or lure behind a boat
- Trout worms – Plastic fishing lure
