= Chumming =

Fishing with chunks of meat

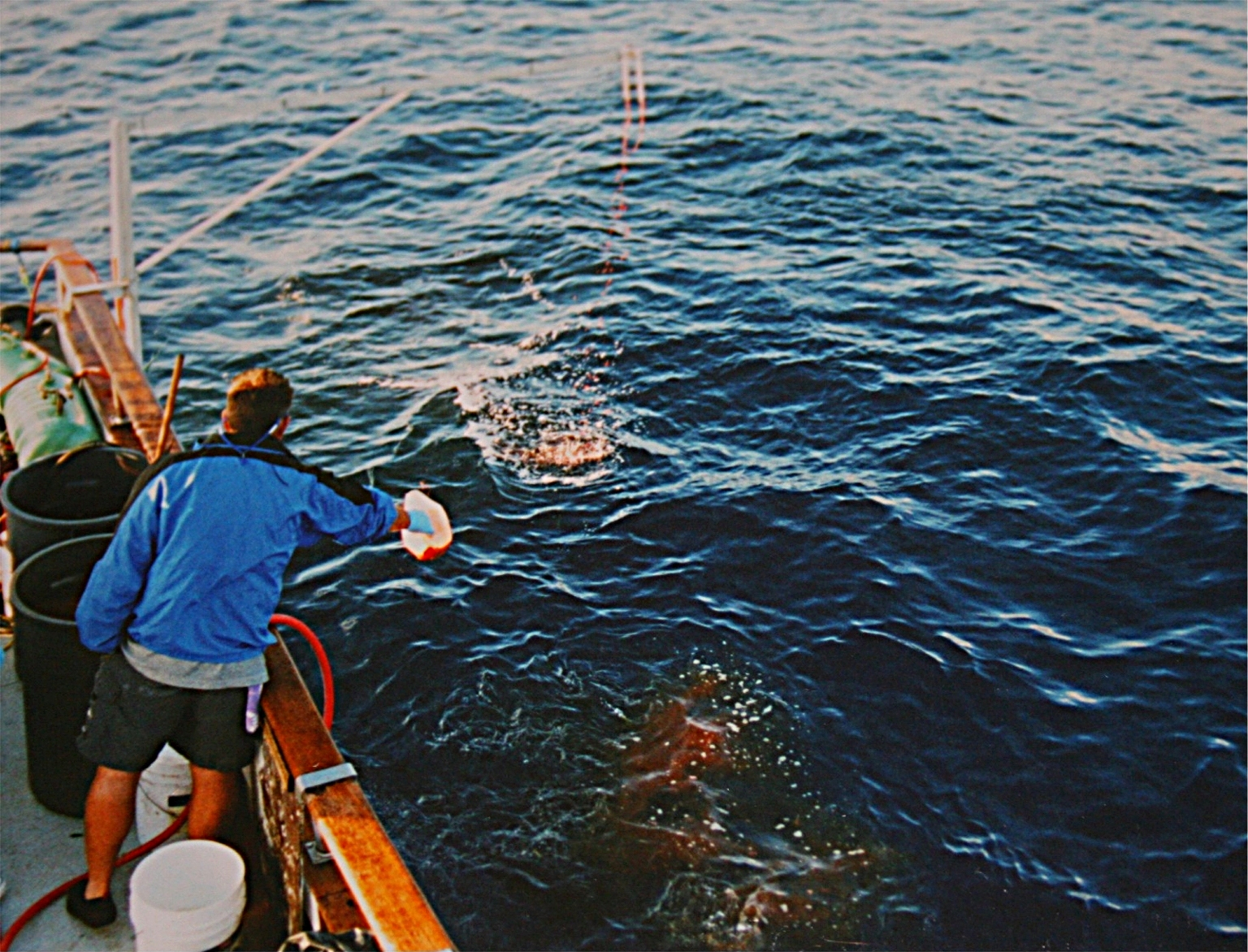
Chumming the water for great white sharks at Guadalupe Island

Chumming (American English from Powhatan) is the blue water fishing practice of throwing meat-based groundbait called "chum" into the water in order to lure various marine animals (usually large game fish) to a designated fishing ground, so the target animals are more easily caught by hooking or spearing. Chums typically consist of fresh chunks of fish meat with bone and blood, the scent of which attracts predatory fish, particularly sharks, billfishes, tunas and groupers. In the past, the chum contents have also been made from "offal", the otherwise rejected or unwanted parts of slaughtered animals such as internal organs.

== Terminology ==
In Australia and New Zealand, chum is referred to as burley, berley or berleying. In the United Kingdom, it is also known as rubby dubby (West Country and Yorkshire).

== Methods ==
Chumming is a common practice seen as effective by fishermen all over the world, typically in open oceans. Multiple forms of chum are available and used by anglers. Bunker consists of fish parts with a fish-enticing aroma. Stink bait contains oily fish parts and blood that releases the scent of dead fish into the water. Sour grain is a commonly used form of chum bait when fishing for catfish in inland waters of the Southern United States.

Native Americans used two methods of chumming. First, they would lie alongside a grasshopper and encourage it to jump into a flowing stream where the fish would consume the grasshopper. The Native Americans would then bait their hook with a grasshopper and hence catch the fish. Additionally, indigenous people would tie a dead animal from a tree above a stream encouraging flies to lay eggs. After weeks, the eggs became maggots and fell into the water, bringing a concentration of fish into the area.

== Legality ==
Chumming is illegal in some parts of the world (such as in the U.S. state of Alabama) because of the danger it can pose by conditioning sharks to associate feeding with human presence. Floridan restrictions for chumming include local laws in saltwater areas. Due to the vast barren sandy bottom structure around most of the state, using chum is a necessity and common practice. The Florida Fish and Wildlife Conservation Commission (FWC) approved changes to shark fishing regulations, including prohibiting chumming when fishing for any species from the beach. The new ruling went into effect July 1, 2019.

== See also ==
- Chum box, a form of internet advertising whose name is derived from the term.
- Groundbait, a means of "appetizer" baiting used in freshwater or coarse fishing.
