= Piscatorial Society =

Angling society in England

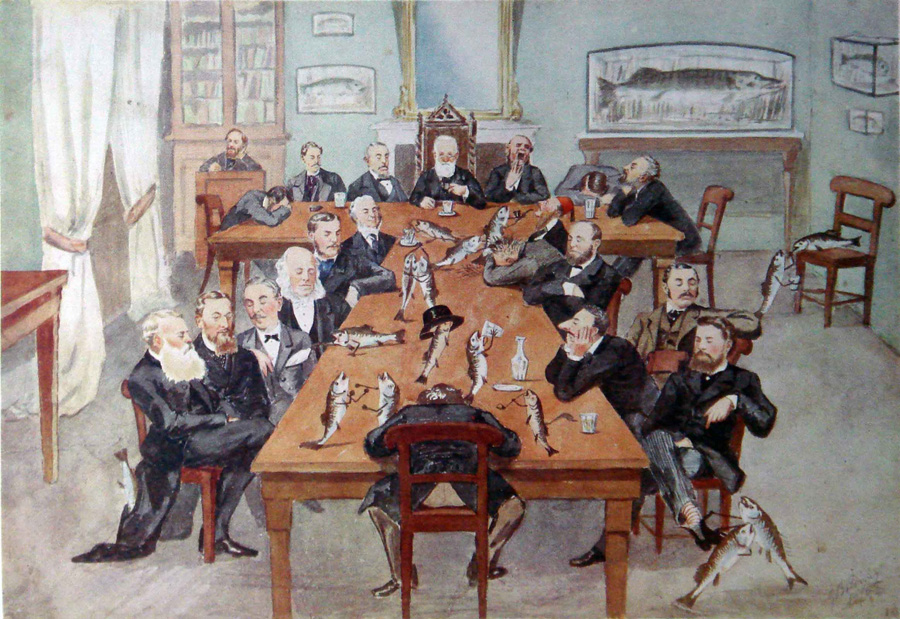
A meeting of the Piscatorial Society in 1878.

The Piscatorial Society is one of the oldest angling societies in England, if not the world. It was founded in 1836 and still flourishes today. It leases fly fishing water on a number of chalk streams in Hampshire and Wiltshire, including the Wylye, the Test, the Itchen and the Hampshire Avon. It no longer has a base in London, but maintains a Rod Room on one of its Wiltshire rivers. Although members originally fished for all sorts of fish (the society's crest still represents the head of a pike), the society now concentrates on fishing for brown trout and grayling with upstream dry fly or unweighted nymph imitations dressed lightly in the style of G. E. M. Skues.

The society has, at its core, three key objectives. First, to maintain a fellowship of fly fishers and the tradition of fly fishing, where possible, for wild or naturalised brown trout and grayling. Secondly, to preserve what remains of the chalk stream environment; unpolluted water, healthy and appropriate weed growth and good fly hatches. Thirdly, to enhance the society's libraries and archives.

== History ==
The first meeting of which the Minutes survive took place on 2 November 1837, and at this meeting it was resolved to have a card engraved for presentation to members. This card bears the inscription:

The Piscatorial Society – Established 16th October, 1837 – For promoting friendly intercourse and mutual information among the lovers of the Art of Angling -Held at the 'Marquis of Granby,' South Audley Street"

The decorated chair in the picture at the head of the table still exists, along with many other original artefacts and books. The club secretary is Ingrid Burt.
