= Groundbait =

Fishing bait thrown into the water

External videos
- Mixing groundbait for carp – GoFishingOnline
- Groundbait Part 1 Part 2 Part 3 – GoFishingOnline

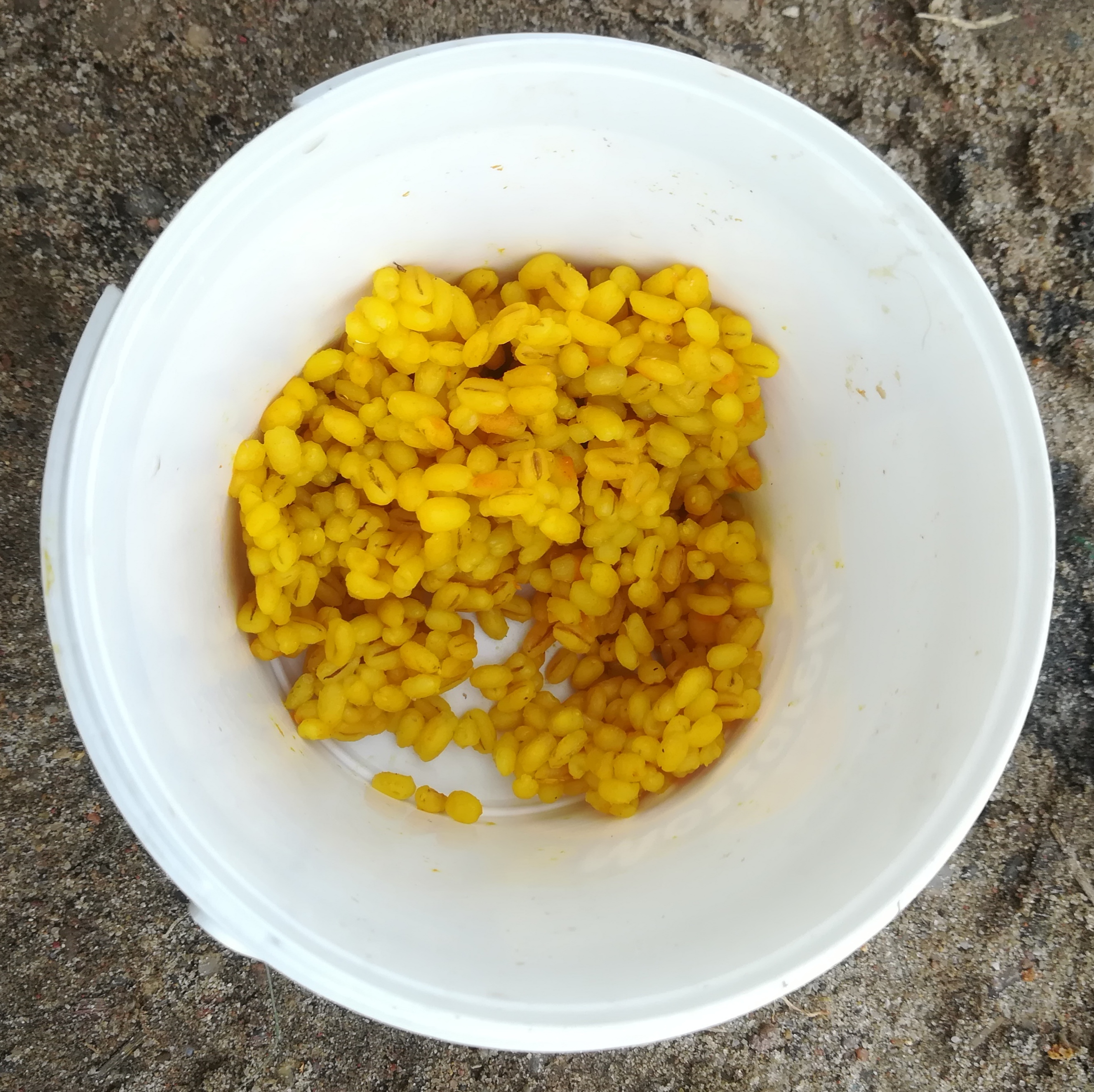
Baked beans used as groundbait

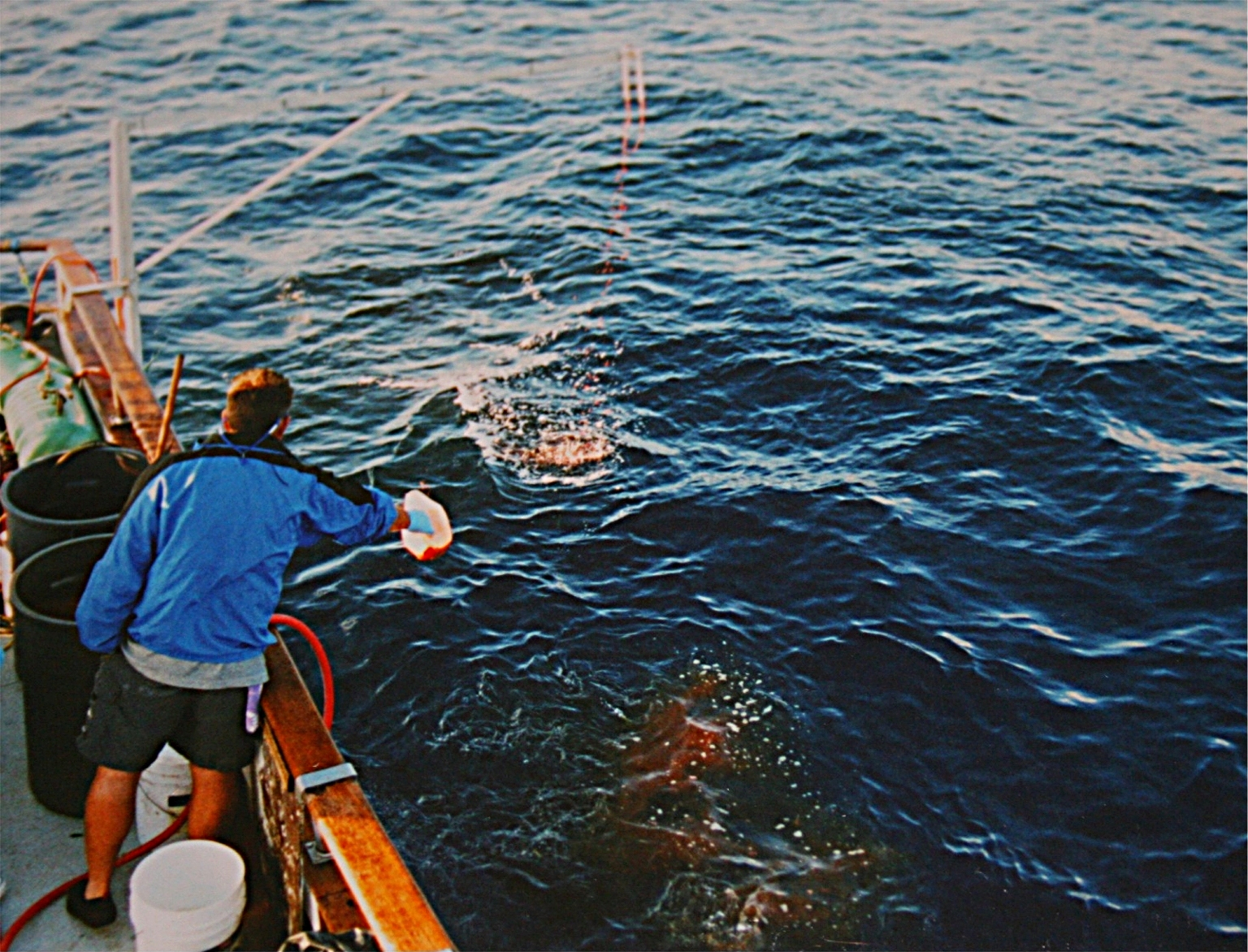
Chumming for sharks with meat-based groundbaits

Groundbait is a fishing bait that is either thrown or "balled" into the water as an "appetizer" in order to olfactorily attract more fish to a designated area (i.e. fishing ground) for more efficient catching via angling, netting, trapping, or even spearing and shooting. Groundbaits are typically scattered separately from the hook and usually before even casting any rod or net, although in bottom fishing they can be deployed synchronously with hookbaits while contained inside a gradual-release device also attached to the fishing line known as a method feeder.

Groundbaits are often used in freshwater coarse fishing (where the target fish are commonly omnivorous or algivorous and might not be easily drawn to the hookbait), and can be custom-made personally by the angler or bulk-purchased from dedicated manufacturers. There are many different recipes of groundbaits that can be used to target specific species of fish. Groundbait can differ by the sizes of the crumbs, type of seed, colour and smell. The angler can also mix additives to the groundbait to alter its firmness in order to control the rate of bait release or breakdown once in the water.

Groundbaits used in blue water fishing are known as "chums", which consist of freshly cut parts of a slaughtered fish often added with blood and offals, in order to attract large predatory fishes.

== Technique ==
The ground-bait

You shall take a peck, or a peck and a half, according to the greatness of the stream and deepness of the water, where you mean to angle, of sweet gross-ground barley-malt; and boil it in a kettle, one or two warms is enough: then strain it through a bag into a tub, the liquor whereof hath often done my horse much good; and when the bag and malt is near cold, take it down to the water-side, about eight or nine of the clock in the evening, and not before: cast in two parts of your ground-bait, squeezed hard between both your hands; it will sink presently to the bottom; and be sure it may rest in the very place where you mean to angle: if the stream run hard, or move a little, cast your malt in handfuls a little the higher, upwards the stream. You may, between your hands, close the malt so fast in handfuls, that the water will hardly part it with the fall.

Your ground thus baited, and tackling fitted, leave your bag, with the rest of your tackling and ground-bait, near the sporting-place all night; and in the morning, about three or four of the clock, visit the water-side, but not too near, for they have a cunning watchman, and are watchful themselves too.

Then, gently take one of your three rods, and bait your hook; casting it over your ground-bait, and gently and secretly draw it to you till the lead rests about the middle of the ground-bait...

— Izaak Walton 1676

Groundbait is a mixture of various natural ingredients, for example fishmeal, bread crumbs, vanilla sugar, hemp seeds or oil, maize and other ingredients, which are then moistened with water and formed into bait balls, which are then cast into the water at the fishing spot as an "appetizer". Depending on the groundbait mixture, the balls may break up quickly and create a "cloud" of particles in the water attractive for mid-water feeding fish, or sink to the bottom where they slowly release scents to attract bottom feeder species.

The amount of groundbait is optimized to draw as many fish as possible to the fishing place, enticing them to freely consume without overfeeding, which will otherwise stop the fish from biting the actual hookbait. Anglers may use groundbait at the fishing site (or swim) for several days before fishing to stimulate the taste of the fish, and then cease groundbaiting for a brief period to allow the fish to regain their appetite before the actual fishing begins.

One method of focusing the fish-drawing is to simply squeeze a ball of groundbait onto the line just above the hook. This way, any fish attracted by the groundbait will be at close proximity to the hook and therefore more likely to also swallow the hookbait.

=== Method feeder ===
Another method of distributing groundbait close to the hookbait is by using a method feeder (or just "feeder" for short), which is a cage/wire container mounted adjacent to the hookbait on the fishing line. Feeders hold compact, moistened groundbait and other particle baits that are gradually released in the water. When the line is cast out, the feeder disperses its contents right near the bait, attracting fish from a wider area specifically towards the hook location. The feeder enclosure also prevents the groundbaits from rapid depletion by a feeding frenzy, which would otherwise cause the fish to become satious from overconsuming the groundbait and thus no longer interested in swallowing the actual hookbait.

The combined mass of the feeder and its contents also serves the function of a sinker, as well as adding momentum to the terminal tackles and hence allowing a greater casting distance.

== Regulation ==
Due to concerns about the ecological impact of introducing nutrients to a water, acting as fertilizer, angling in some waters is affected by regulations on groundbait use. Where groundbait is banned, soil or loam is sometimes used as a substitute.

== Other uses ==
The BBC have used the term to describe popular TV shows, placed immediately before newscasts or broadcasts of a socially pertinent nature, to draw in viewers.

In Austria, the German term Anfüttern is used to mean a way of bribing, particularly in regard to political corruption.

== See also ==
- Chumming
- Fishing bait
