= Fishing float =

Angling equipment

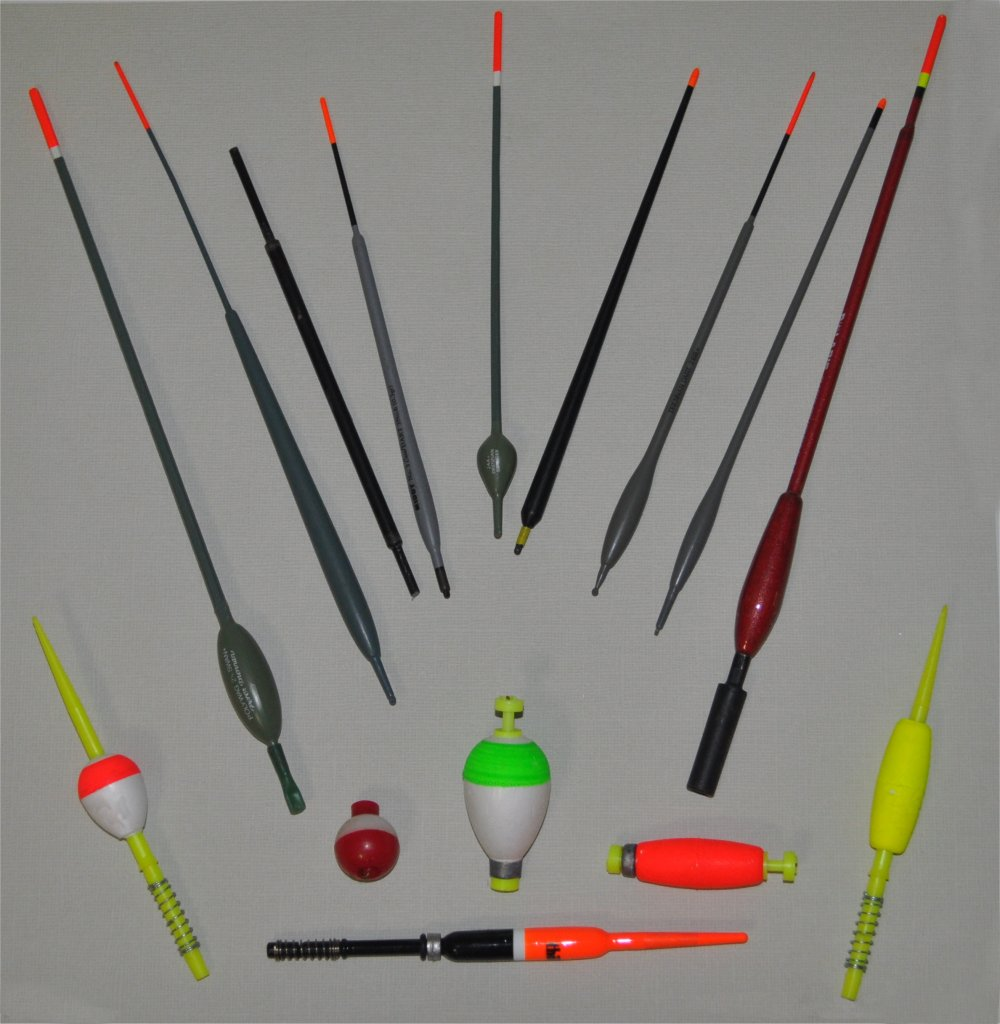
Selection of UK (top) and US (bottom) fishing floats

A fishing float or bobber is a lightweight buoy used in angling, usually attached to a fishing line. Angling with a float is sometimes called float fishing.

A float can serve several purposes:

- firstly, it serves as a visual bite indicator that helps the angler assess underwater status of the baited hook and decide whether to start retrieving the line;
- secondly, it can suspend the hook and bait at a predetermined depth, which helps the angler target fish in specific depths;
- thirdly, as a terminal tackle, it adds mass and allows the hook and bait to be cast further against air resistance;
- and lastly, due to its buoyancy, it can carry the baited hook to otherwise inaccessible areas of water by drifting along the prevailing current.

== Design and functions ==
A typical float consists of a body with lower specific gravity than water, which provides the buoyancy to remain afloat at the water surface; a brightly colored rod at the top, which makes it easier to be seen from afar; and an attachment at the bottom that suspends the hook. A small counterweight is sometimes placed at the bottom to help the float to stay upright against wind and waves.

The float is used to enable the angler to cast out a bait away from the shore or boat while maintaining a reference point to where the bait is unlike bottom or leger fishing. The angler will select an appropriate float after taking into account the strength of the current (if any), the wind speed, the size of the bait, the depth the angler wishes to present that bait at and the distance the bait is to be cast. The line between the float and hook will usually have small weights attached, ensuring that the float sits vertically in the water with only a brightly coloured tip remaining visible. The rest of the float is typically finished in a dull neutral colour to render it as inconspicuous as possible to the fish. Each float style is designed to be used in certain types of conditions such as slow or fast rivers, windy or still water or small confined waters like canals.

== History ==
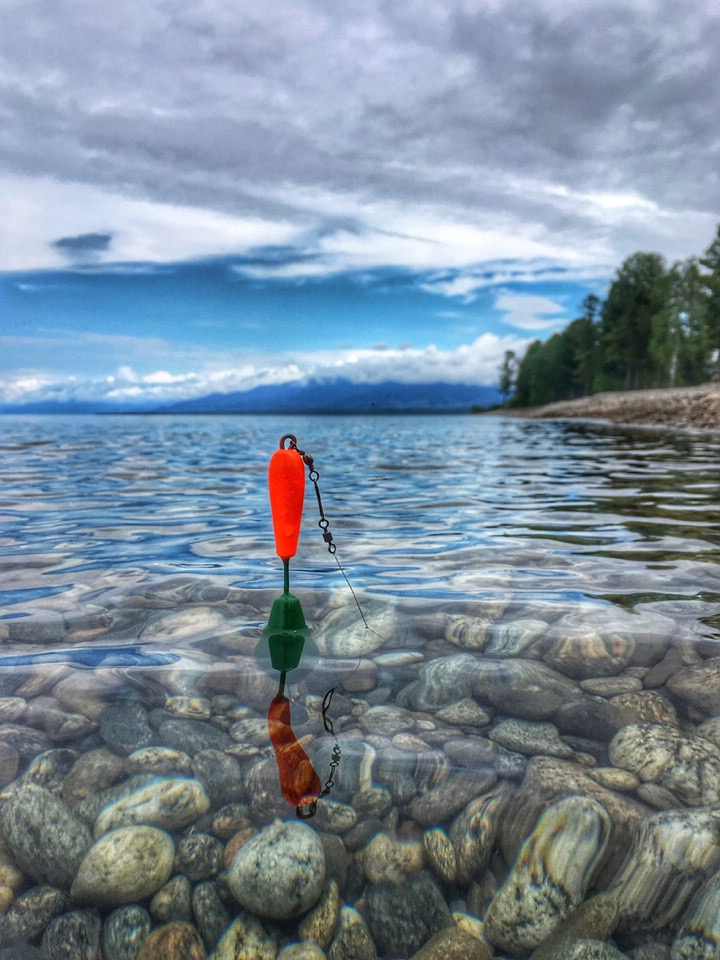
Fishing rod float. Lake Baikal. Eastern Siberia

It is impossible to determine with any degree of accuracy who first used a float for sensing a fish had taken the bait, but it can be said with some certainty that people used pieces of twig, bird feather quills or rolled leaves as bite indicators, many years before documented evidence. The first known mention of using a float appears in the book "Treatyse of fysshynge wyth an Angle" written by Juliana Berners in 1496:

All maner lynes that be not for the grounde must haue flotes, and the rennyng ground lyne must haue a flote, the lyeng ground lyne must haue a flote.

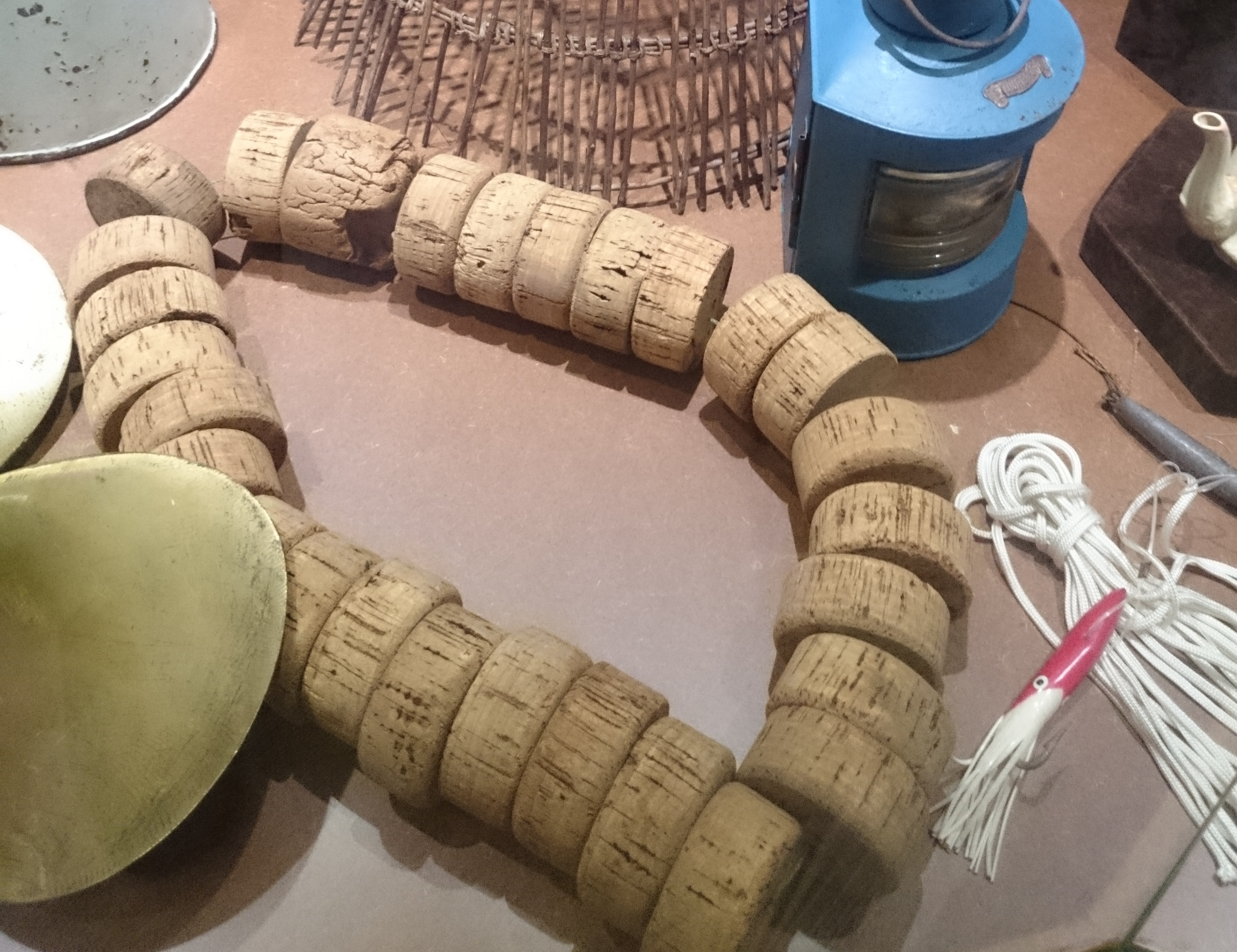
Cork fishing floats

The method described, involved boring a hole through a cork so the line could be passed through and trapped with a quill. Later books such as "the Arte of Angling", a 1577 text edited by Gerald Eades Bentley in 1956, and the classic work "The Compleat Angler" first published in 1653, written by Isaak Walton, gave greater detail on fishing and using floats.

Prior to about 1800, anglers made their own floats, a practice that many still continue today. As angling became more popular, companies started to make floats in different styles to supply the growing demand. By 1921, companies such as Wadhams had at least 250 mainly celluloid floats in their catalog.

Since those early days, the fishing float has become the subject of much practical and theoretical change. English anglers such as Peter Drennan (Drennan International) and Kenneth Middleton (Middy Tackle) and American fishermen like Chicago's ex World Champion Mick Thill (Thill Floats) have built up large companies designing and marketing fishing floats. The English companies have been supported by major league anglers such as Ivan Marks, Benny Ashurst and Billy Lane.

== Types ==
Floats come in different sizes and shapes, and can be made from various materials, such as foam, balsa wood, cork, plastic, Indian sarkanda reed, or even bird/porcupine quills.

=== Avon ===
The Avon float is a straight float with a body at the top. It was designed to cope with the fast flow conditions of the English River Avon. Many early floats were Avon style having a cork body pushed onto a crow quill. It is attached to the line top and bottom.

=== Bubble ===
Bubble floats are small hollow balls which are used to control the fishing line. They may have the facility to be partially filled with water to control how much float is above the water. They are used in situations where a normal float cannot be cast, such as working close to the edge of reeds or heavy surface plant growth. The bubble float can be allowed to drift into the area without tangling.

=== Dink ===
The Dink Float is most commonly made of a cylinder of dark foam with a smaller cylinder of cork on the top painted for indicator. The line is run through the top, wrapped around the cylinder and through the bottom. The primary advantage is that the float does not need a stopper on the main line. The wrap of line between the top and bottom of the float will hold it in place.

=== Popper ===
A popper float, commonly called a 'popping cork', is designed to mimic a large fish feeding at the surface with rod action. There are different styles of popper floats. Some use a metal wire with beads at each end to make a clicking noise when pulled through the water, while more modern floats use a concave top, which makes a deep chugging sound when pulled through the water, imitating the sound of large predator fish feeding at the surface. Some popping corks also have pellets inside, designed to mimic bait fish jumping at the surface when rattled.

=== Quill ===
The quill is one of the earliest floats. It was originally a bird feather quill, but with the opening up of new worlds, porcupine quills from Africa became a standard for the float. It is fished in the same way as a stick float.

=== Self-cocking ===
Self-cocking floats can be of many styles, but they are all weighted so that in the water they automatically stand upright without the use of shot or weights on the fishing line.

=== Stick ===
The Stick Float is a straight float with a taper. It is always attached to the line both top and bottom. They are made from two different materials, a light, buoyant top section of balsa wood and a heavy stem of hard grade cane, non-buoyant hardwood, or plastic. Unlike the Avon float, the stick has no body; it is just a tapered rod.

=== Waggler ===
A waggler float is the term given to any float which is attached only at the bottom to the line. They come in two different types, straight or bodied. These two types can come both with and without inserts (antennas). They are made from a variety of materials including quills (such as peacock), balsa wood, cane, plastic and reed.

=== With direction control ===
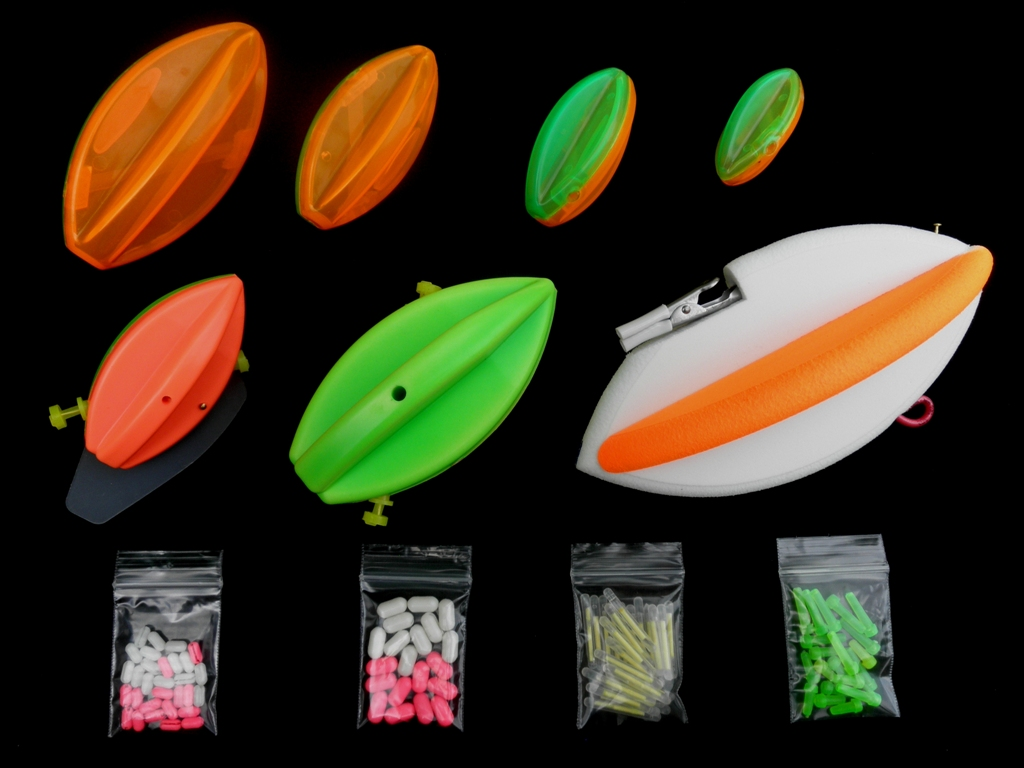
Fishing floats with direction control

Floats with direction control change direction by planing or moving to one side when given a tug.

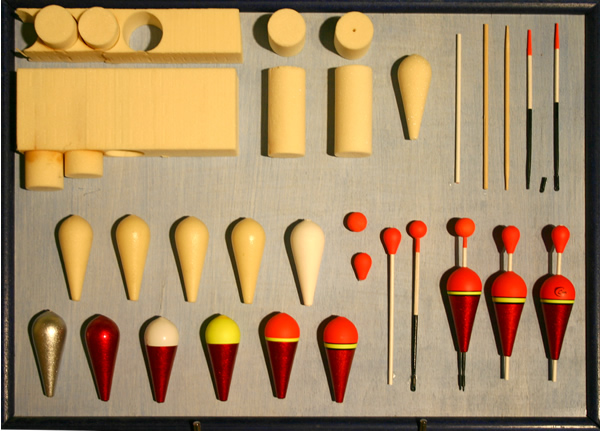
Stages of manufacturing a fishing float

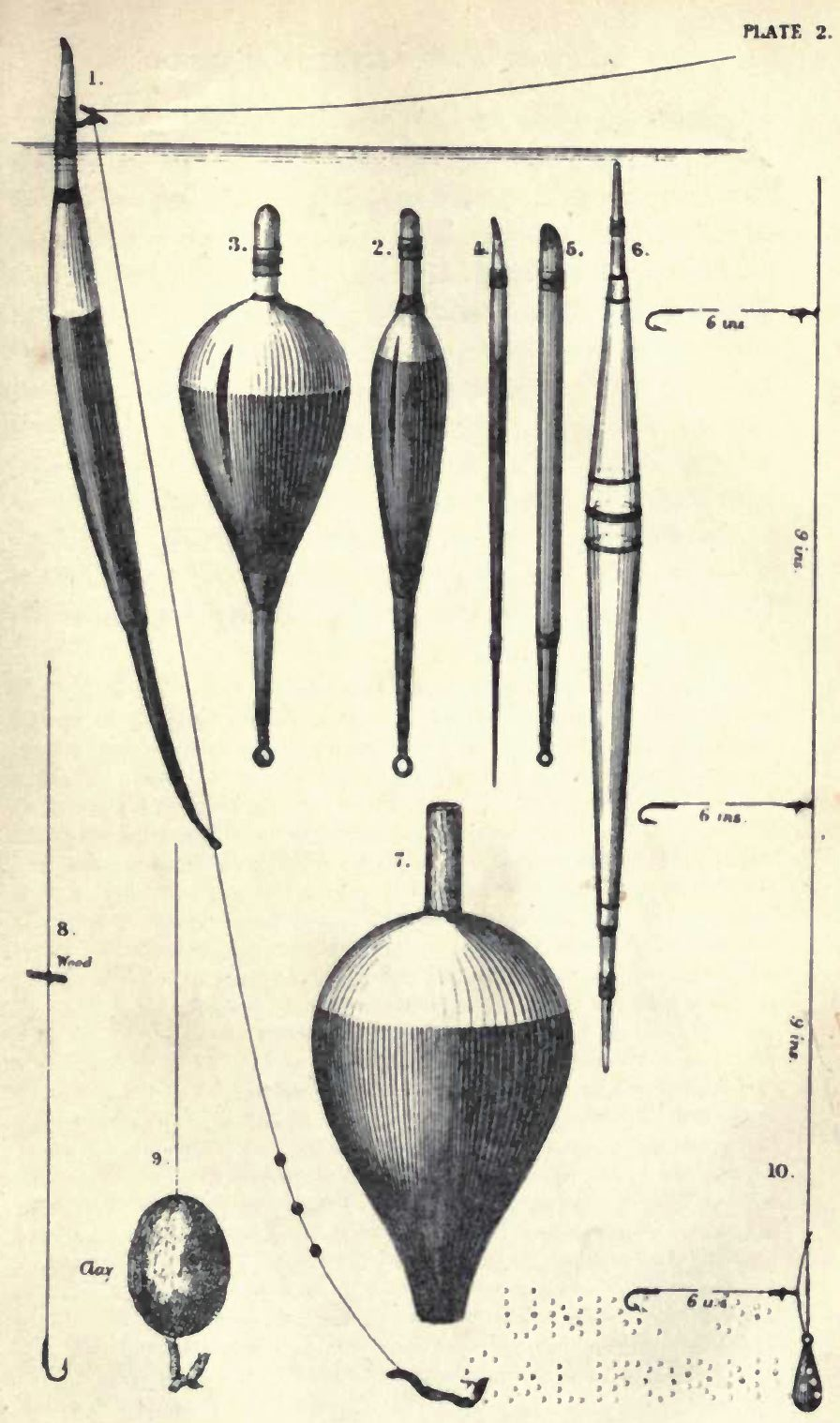
The slider and other floats, from A Book on Angling by Francis Francis, 1876

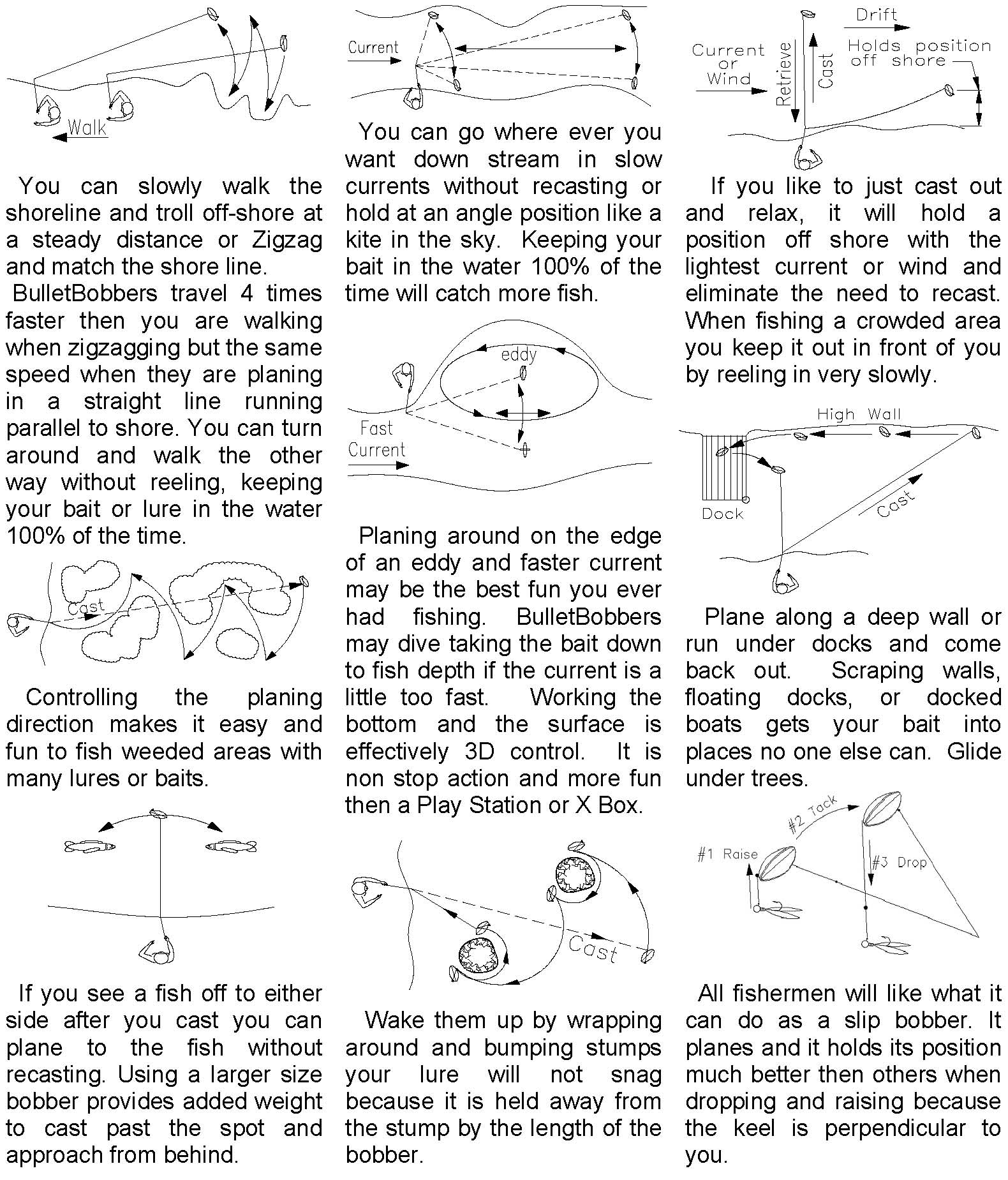
Techniques for using fishing floats with direction control
