= Casting (fishing) =

Act of launching fishing tackles into water

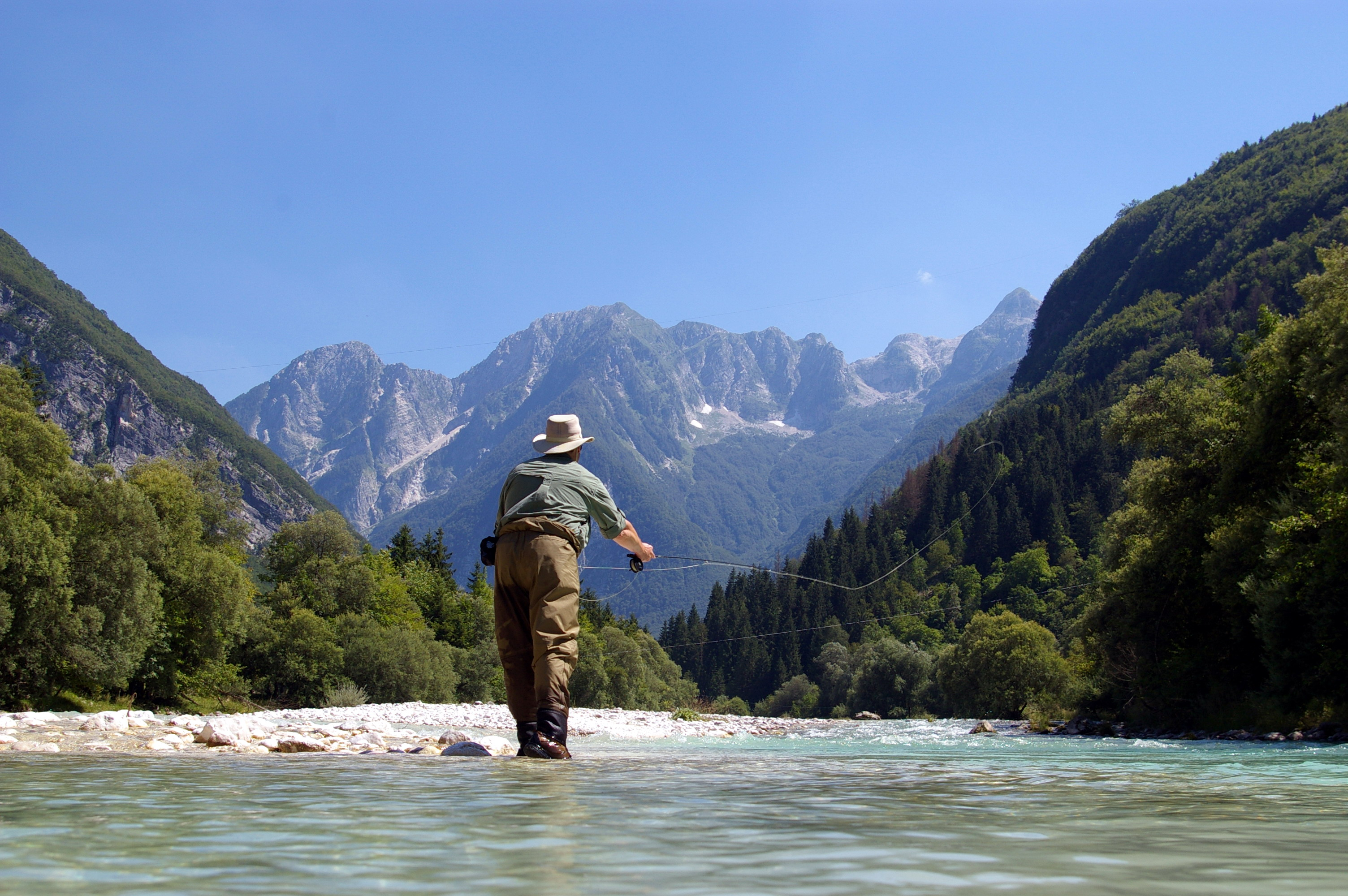
A fly fisherman casting his lure on Soca River, Slovenia

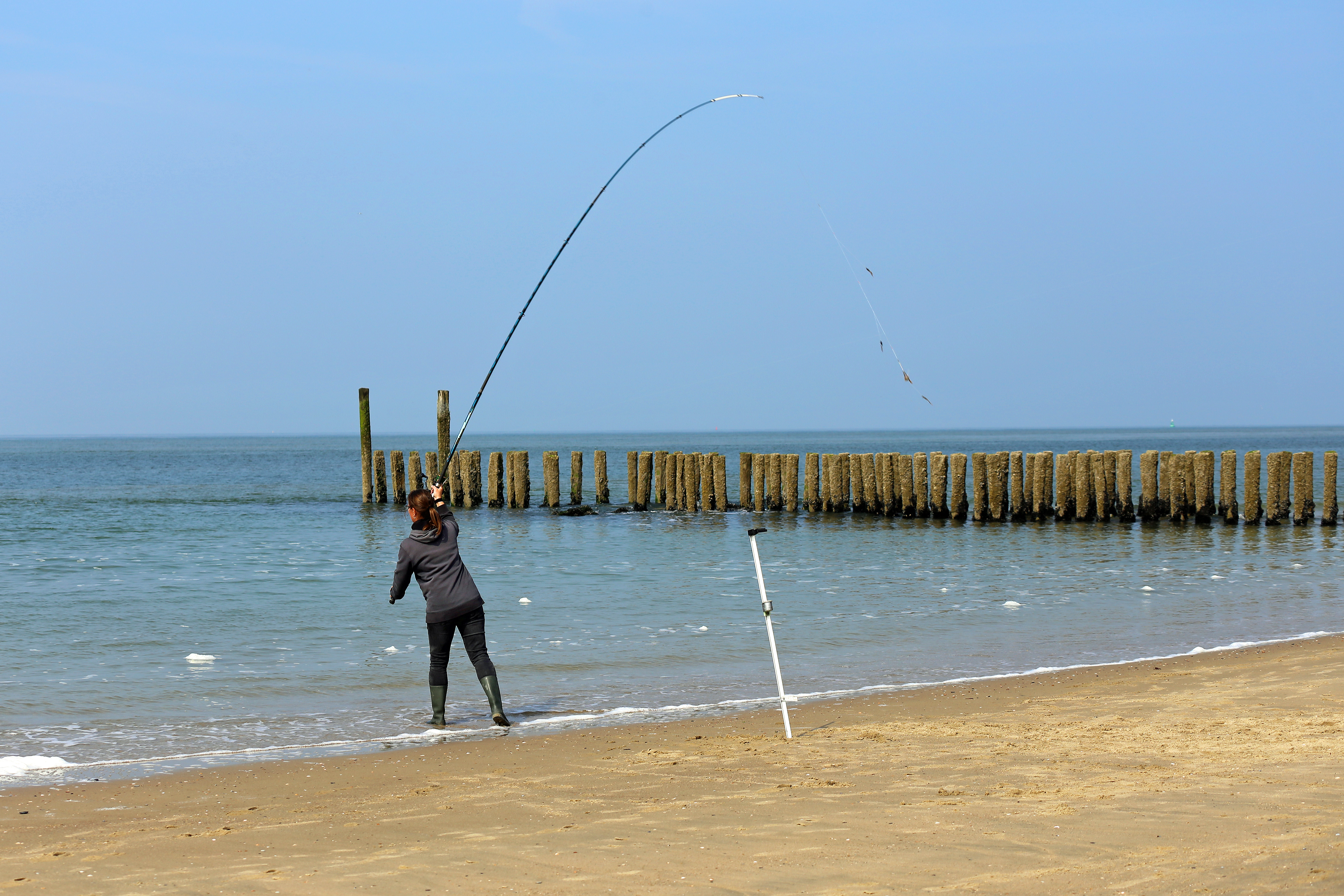
An angler beach-casting a multi-lure rig

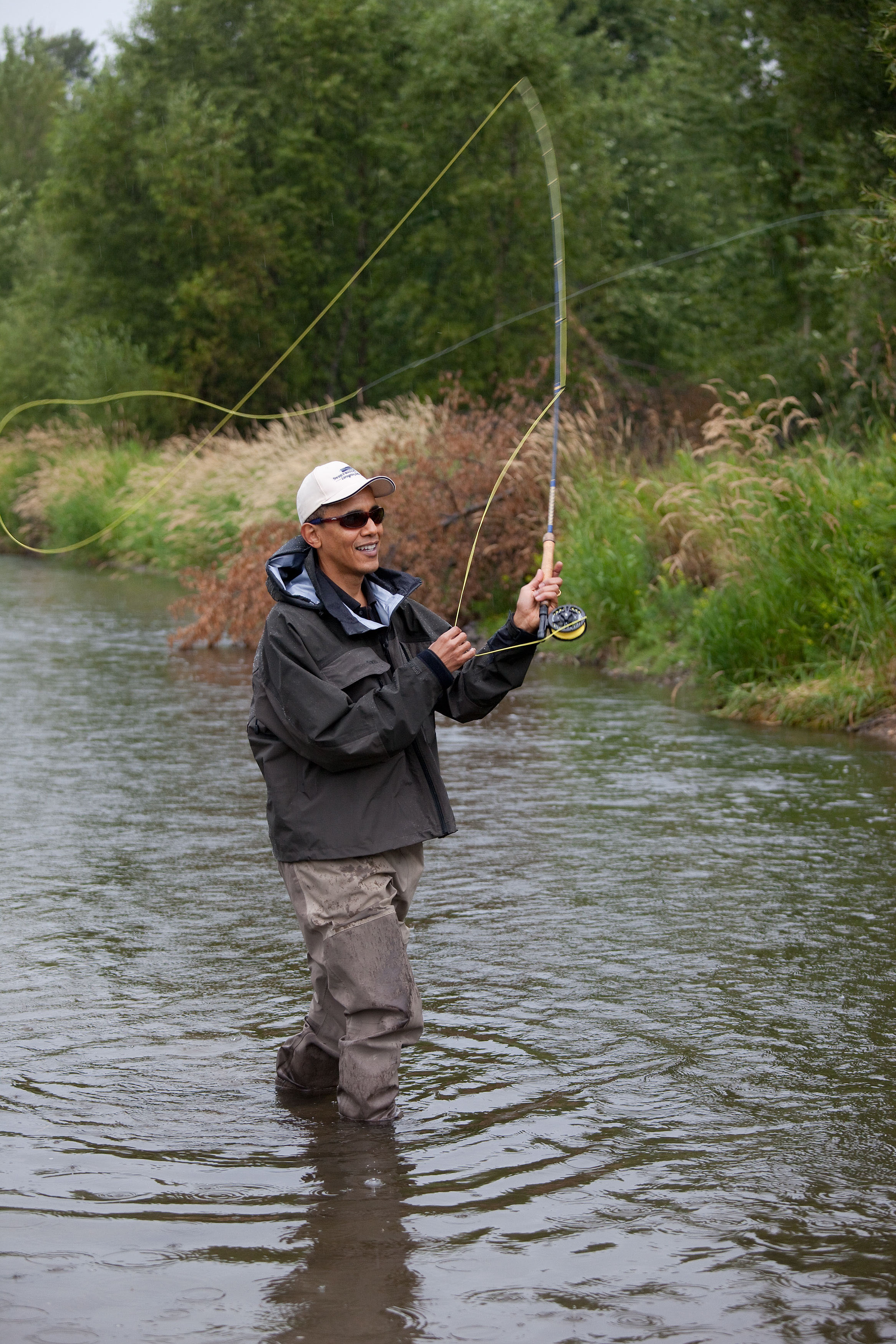
Barack Obama casting while fly-fishing for trout on the East Gallatin River near Belgrade, Montana

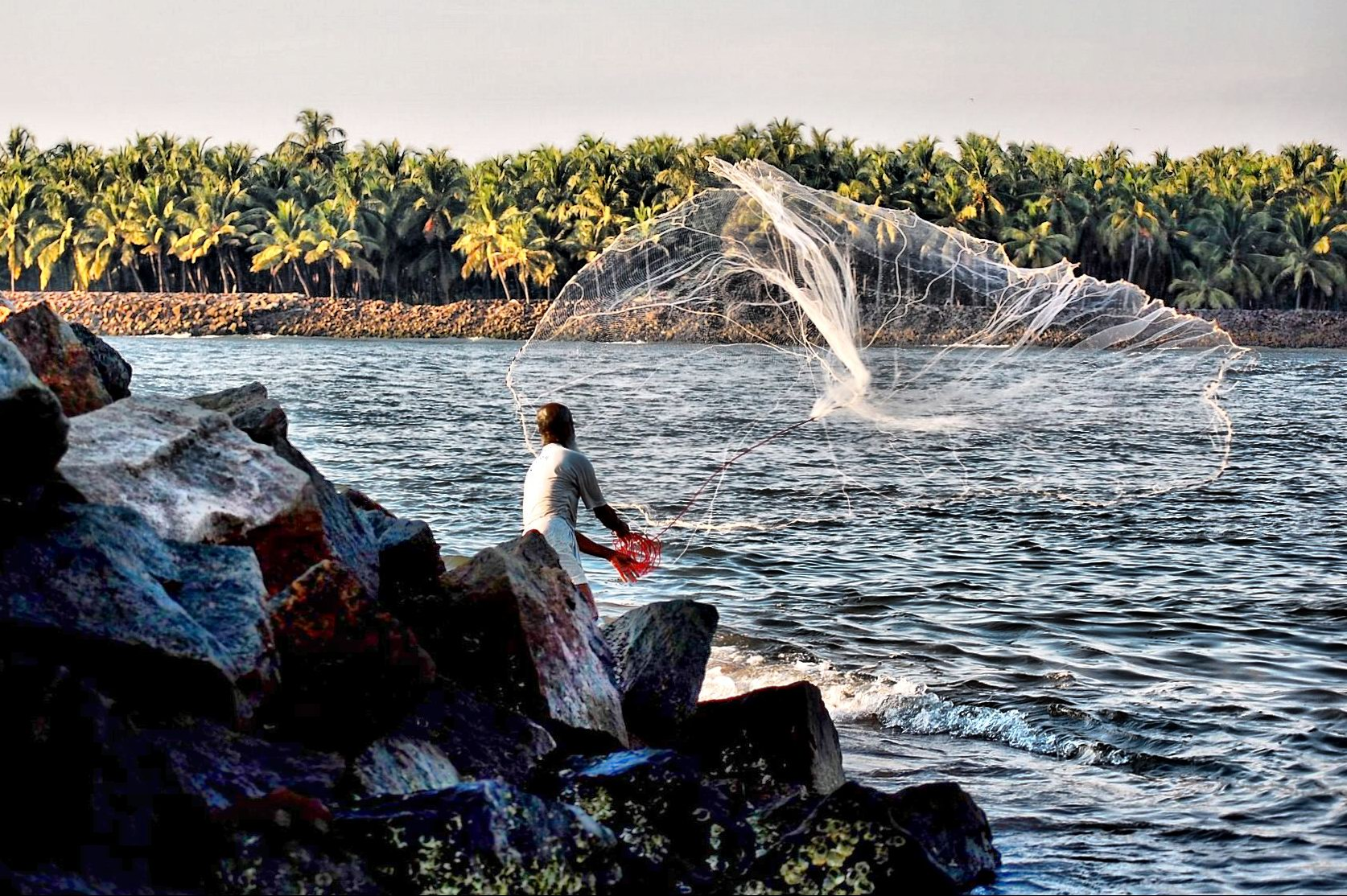
Net casting from rocks by a fisherman

In fishing, casting is the act of the throwing a fishing tackle or rig into the water in order to deploy it. In recreational fishing, the term most commonly describes an angler launching a baited hook (or a lure) as well as other attached terminal tackles (e.g. float or sinker) out far over the water, typically by slinging a line manipulated by a long, elastic rod. The term is also used for scattering groundbaits/chums, manually throwing a hook when handlining, and setting out a net during artisanal fishing.

The basic casting technique in angling is to flick/swing the rod forward towards the water, with the lagging inertia of the tackles bending the rod backward (i.e. "loading" the rod), and then use the "springing" (elastic rebound) of the rod to "hurl" and rapidly sling the line forward, which in turn will launch out the hook and bait. There are several methods anglers can use to cast further, the most prominent of which is the shifting of body weight towards the front foot in kinematic synchrony to the forward swinging of the rod. That, combined with using a longer rod, stopping the rod swing at 45 degrees, and using correctly weighted and more aerodynamic terminal tackles, will help anglers cast further. There are also variation techniques the anglers can use to cast the tackles more accurately to an exact location on the water or to get past potential obstacles.

== Casting techniques ==
Casting techniques vary with the type and style of angling involved. Separate casting techniques are also used by different anglers according to personal preferences and proficiency, and each technique is named uniquely. In the single-hand sidearm cast, the angler first points the rod towards the targeted area, and then swings it back and quickly forward like a tennis stroke, creating a cast with a relatively flat trajectory. Drop-casting, on the other hand, is all about fast sinking, and the angler must bring the rod high before releasing the finger grip on the line and drop the cast into the water with full force. The double-handed overhead cast, used more for distance, utilizes a kendo-like overhead swing to throw the line as far as possible.

Freshwater anglers typically use lightweight, faster-action rods and for panfishing or finesse fishing for popular mid-sized game fishes such as black bass or trout, while sturdier, heavier rods are used for larger, stronger and feistier fish. When casting light rods, sidearm casting techniques are typically used. If long distance is needed, an overhead cast is more common. For smaller, weed-rich bodies of water (like ponds, rivers/creeks and wetlands), where casting accuracy is more important than distance, anglers sometimes use a swinging technique known as flipping or pitching, an elastic technique known as a slingshot cast, or a softball pitch technique that can make the bait/lure skim the water known as a roll cast.

Saltwater anglers typically use heavier rods and lines, as they often use baits and lures that are larger and heavier than those used on freshwater. Heavier again are the rods and lines used in surfcasting, and specialized two-handed casting techniques are used to provide the added distances required for the baits/lures to get past the surfs and reach inshore fish feeding near the upwellings. In these casts, the angler utilizes the entire body, rather than just the arms, to deliver the momentum of the cast, which may travel many hundreds of meters/feet.

Fly fishermen use ultralight artificial flies as a lure and thus use flexible lightweight rods to cast heavy lines. The technique often involves swinging the line in circles multiple times to build up momentum, before releasing the hand hold on the line and pointing the rod towards the intended direction, so the line creates a loop that propagates like a wave and carries the fly out to the far end with great accuracy. Once on or in the water, the fly can mimic aquatic insects or other invertebrates and attract insectivorous fish such as trout and anadromous salmon.

== Casting as a sport ==
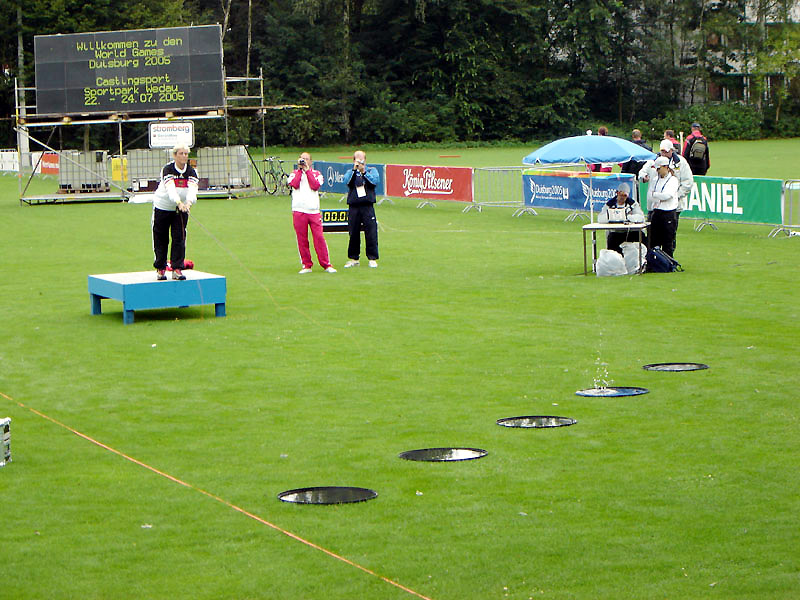
A competitor, Jana Maisel, casts her fly into one of the goal pools at the 2005 World Games in Duisburg.

Casting (known as Casting Sport) is also a sport adjunct to fishing, much like shooting is to hunting. The sport is supervised by the International Casting Sport Federation (ICSF) which was founded in 1955 and as of April 2014 has member associations in 31 countries.

The ICSF sponsors tournaments and recognizes world records for accuracy and distance. This sport uses plastic weights or hookless flies, and can be held on water or on athletic fields. There are competitive divisions for almost all types of fly, fixed spool and revolving spool tackle, and competitor classes. It has been included in the World Games (see photo) and has been considered for the Olympics.

The American Casting Association held its 100th Annual Casting Championships in 2008 at the Golden Gate Angling & Casting Club.

== See also ==
- Fly fishing
- Fly casting
- Net casting
- Reach cast
- Spey casting
- Surf fishing or beach casting
