= Fishing techniques =

Methods for catching sea creatures, especially fish

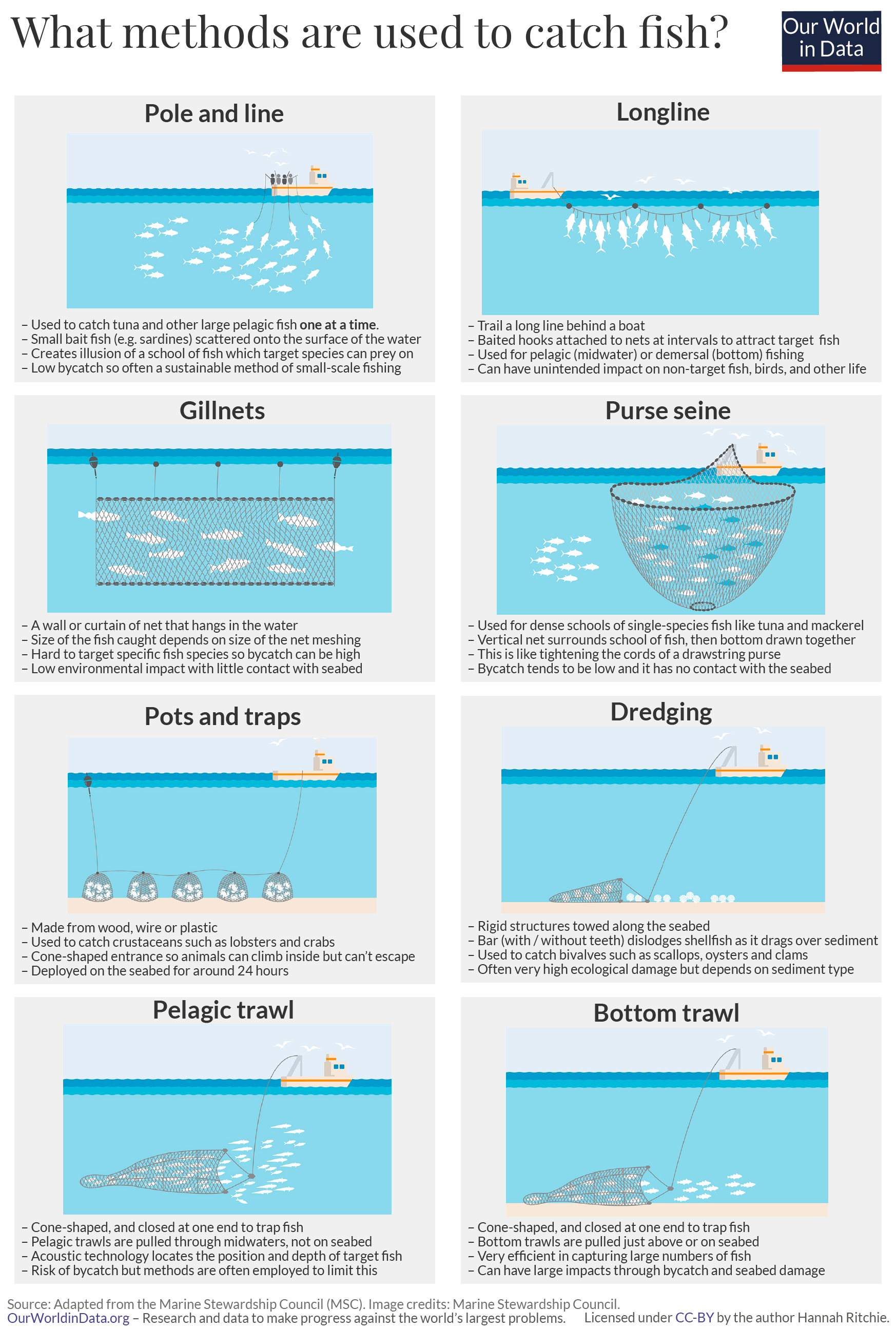
Major fishing techniques.

Wild fish catch by gear type, World. Among the major fishing techniques bottom trawling is a destructive one.

Fishing techniques are methods for catching fish. The term may also be applied to catching other aquatic animals such as molluscs (shellfish, squid, octopus) and edible marine invertebrates.

Fishing techniques include hand-gathering, spearfishing, netting, angling and trapping. Recreational, commercial and artisanal fishers use different techniques, and also, sometimes, the same techniques. Recreational fishers fish for pleasure or sport, while commercial fishers fish for profit. Artisanal fishers use traditional, low-tech methods, for survival in developing countries, and as a cultural heritage in other countries. Mostly, recreational fishers use angling methods and commercial fishers use netting methods.

There is an intricate link between various fishing techniques and knowledge about the fish and their behaviour including migration, foraging and habitat. The effective use of fishing techniques often depends on this additional knowledge. Which techniques are appropriate is dictated mainly by the target species and by its habitat.

Fishing techniques can be contrasted with fishing tackle. Fishing tackle refers to the physical equipment that is used when fishing, whereas fishing techniques refers to the manner in which the tackle is used when fishing.

== Hand-gathering ==
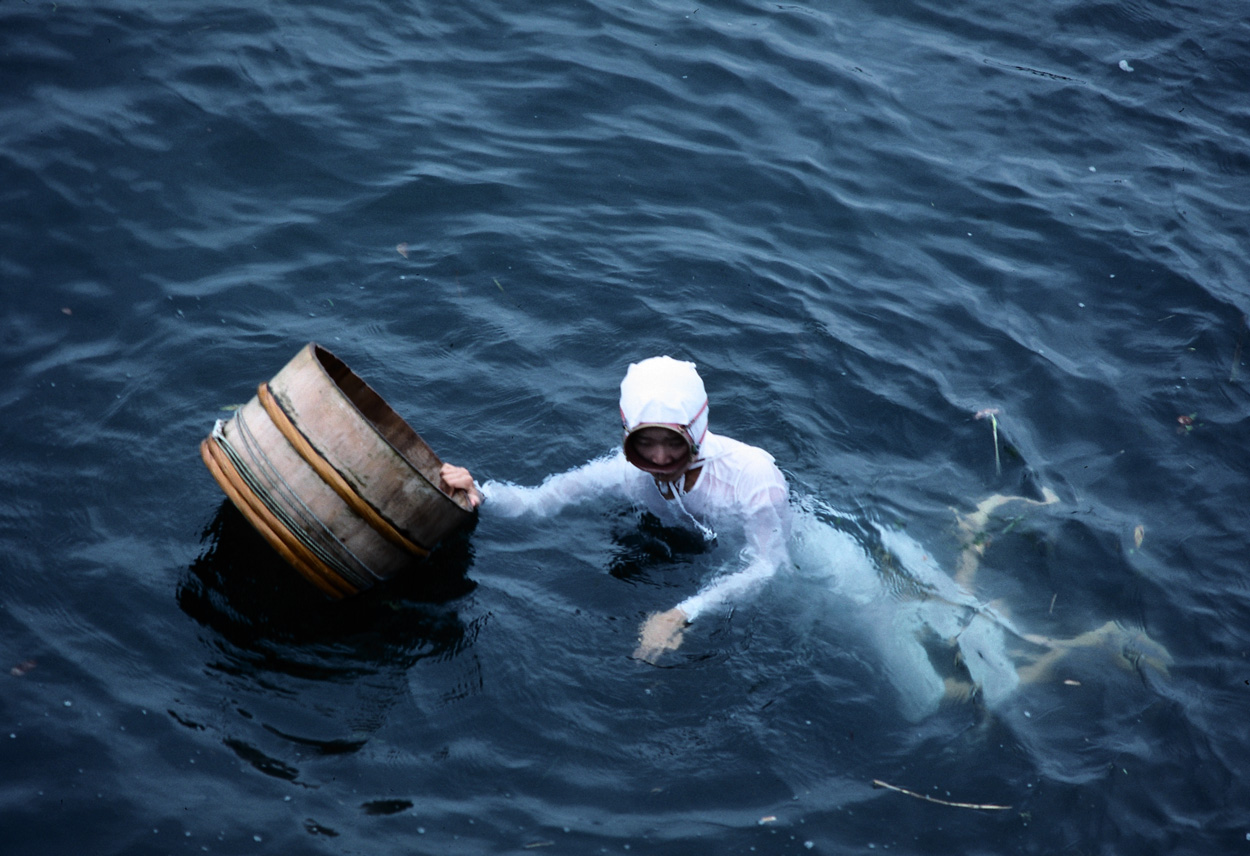
Ama diver in Japan

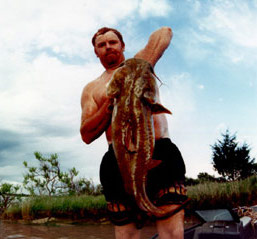
Noodling for catfish in southern USA

It is possible to harvest many sea foods with minimal equipment by using the hands. Gathering seafood by hand can be as easy as picking shellfish or kelp up off the beach, or doing some digging for clams or crabs. The earliest evidence for shellfish gathering dates back to a 300,000-year-old site in France called Terra Amata. This is a hominid site as modern Homo sapiens did not appear in Europe until around 50,000 years ago.

- Flounder tramping - Every August, the small Scottish village of Palnackie hosts the world flounder tramping championships where flounder are captured by stepping on them.
- Noodling: Practiced in the United States, mostly in the South. The noodler places his hand inside a catfish hole. If all goes as planned, the catfish swims forward and latches onto the noodler's hand, and can then be dragged out of the hole, albeit with risk of injury to the noodler.
- Pearl divers - traditionally harvested oysters by free-diving to depths of thirty metres. Today, free-diving recreational fishers catch lobster and abalone by hand.
- Trout tickling - In the British Isles, the practice of catching trout by hand is known as trout tickling; it is an art mentioned several times in the plays of Shakespeare.

== Spearfishing ==
Spearfishing is an ancient method of fishing conducted with an ordinary spear or a specialized variant such as a harpoon, trident, arrow or eel spear. Some fishing spears use slings (or rubber loops) to propel the spear.

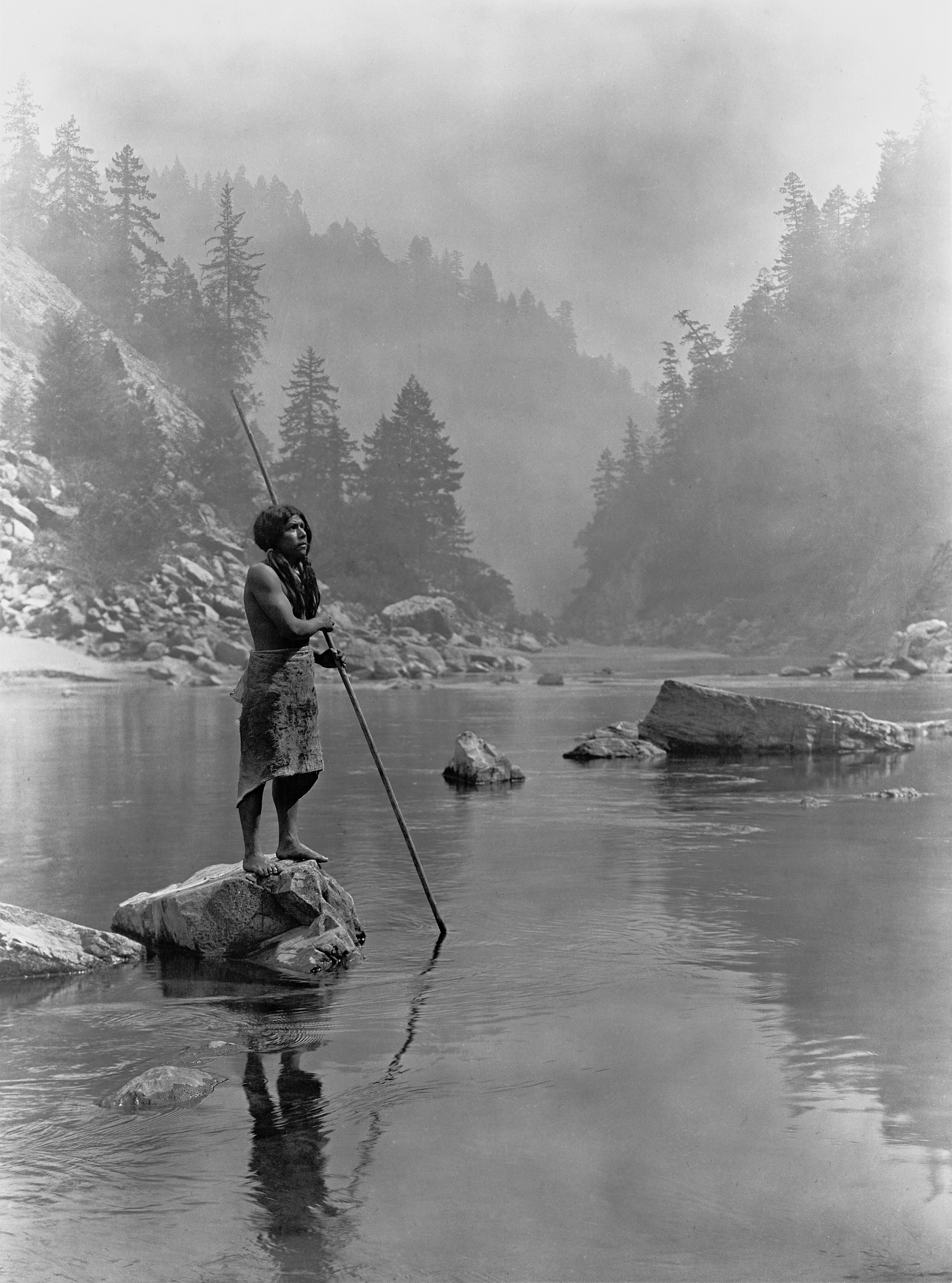
A Hupa man with his spear

- Bowfishing - uses a bow and arrow to kill fish in shallow water from above.
- Gigging - uses small trident type spears with long handles for gigging bullfrogs with a bright light at night, or for gigging suckers and other rough fish in shallow water. Gigging is popular in the American South and Midwest.
- Hawaiian slings - have a sling separate from the spear, in the manner of an underwater bow and arrow.
- Harpoons - A spearfishing technique that was widely used not just for river, pond, lake or stream fishing; it was used also for whaling in open oceans. Evidence has been found of harpoons made out of bone in Brazil that are 5000 years old that may have been used to go hunt whales from the Arctic.
- Pike pole fishing and gaff fishing - Use handheld poles with sharp spikes to hit and impale fish.
- Polespears - have a sling attached to the spear.
- Modern spearguns - traditional spearfishing is restricted to shallow waters, but the development of the speargun has made the method much more efficient. With practice, divers are able to hold their breath for up to four minutes and sometimes longer. Of course, a diver with underwater breathing equipment can dive for much longer periods.
- Tridents - are three-pronged spears. They are also called leisters or gigs. They are used for spear fishing and were formerly also a military weapon. They feature widely in early mythology and history.

== Netting ==
Fishing nets are meshes usually formed by knotting a relatively thin thread. About 180 AD the Greek author Oppian wrote the Halieutica, a didactic poem about fishing. He described various means of fishing including the use of nets cast from boats, scoop nets held open by a hoop, and various traps "which work while their masters sleep".

Netting is the principal method of commercial fishing, though longlining, trolling, dredging and traps are also used.

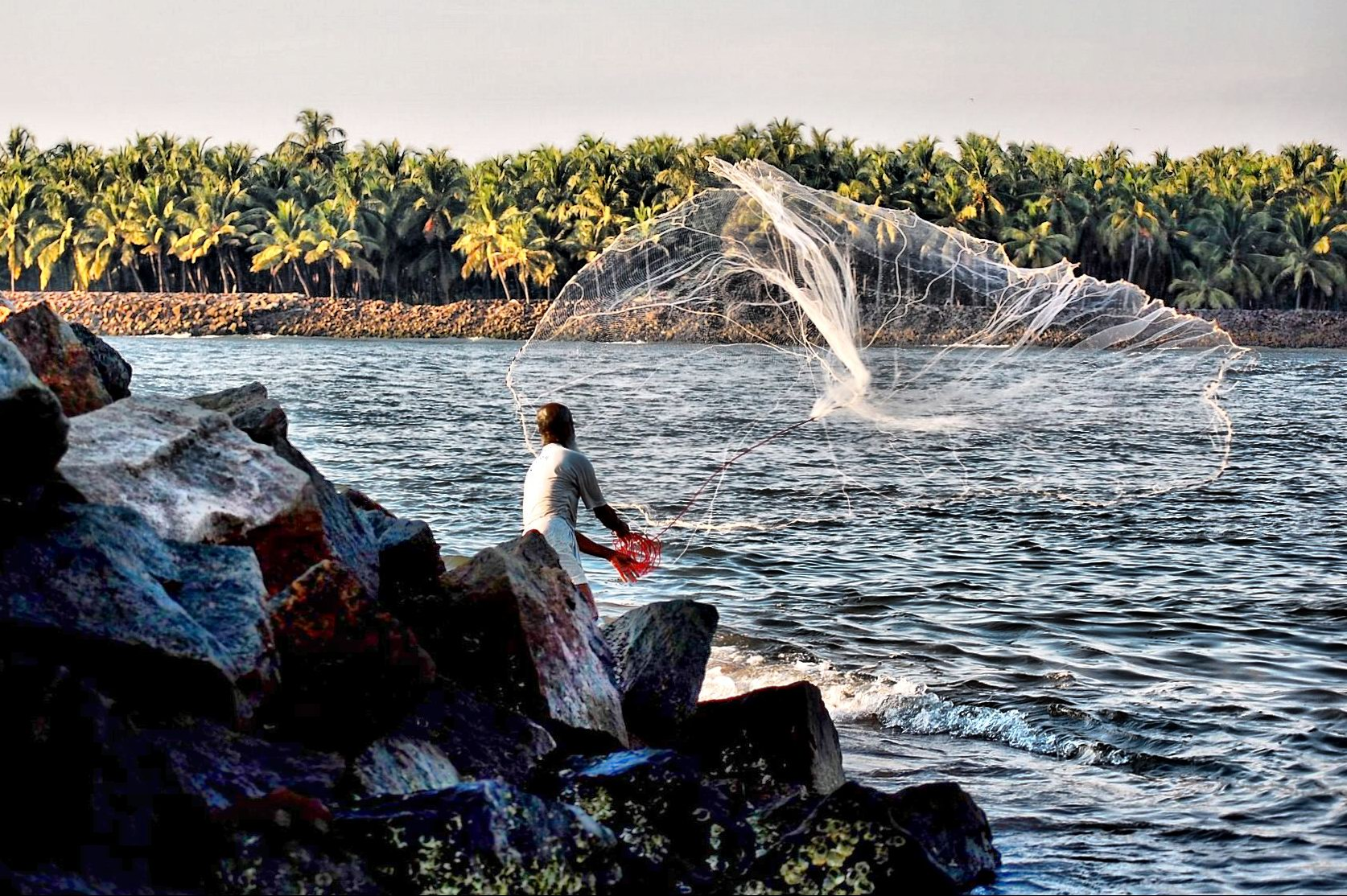
A fisherman casting a net in Kerala, India

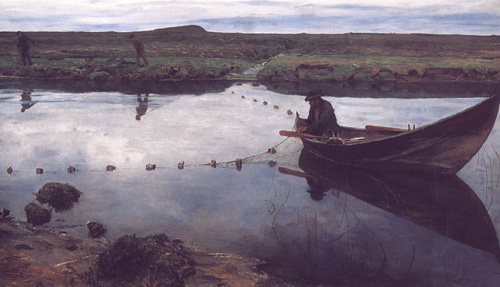
Oil painting of gillnetting, The salmon fisher by Eilif Peterssen

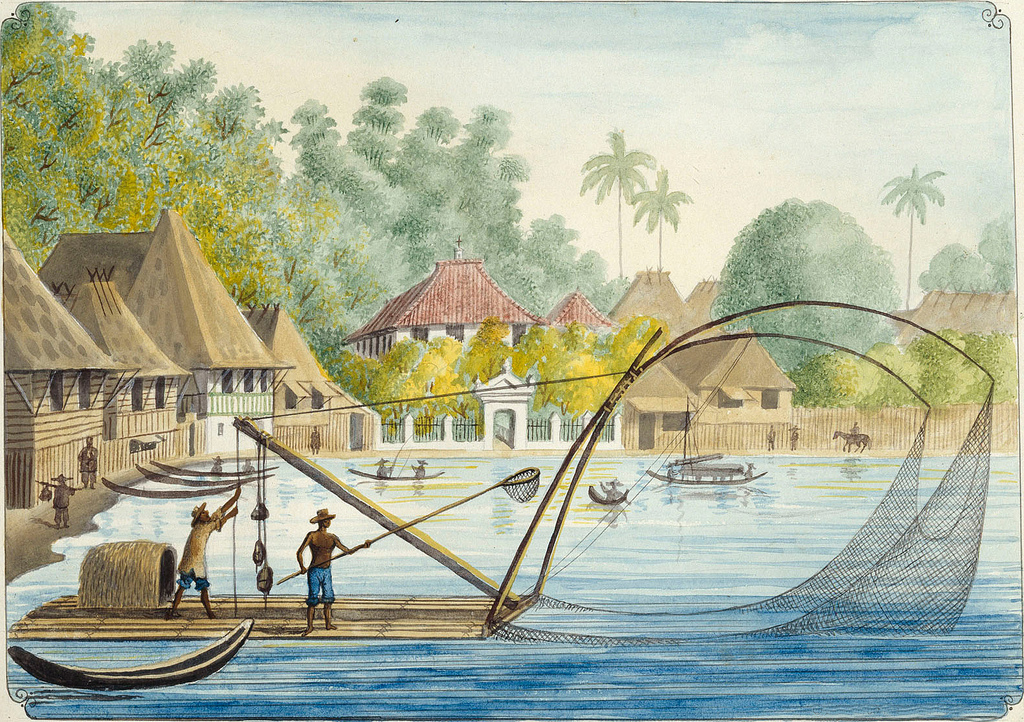
Pesca con el Sarambao (1847), a painting of salambáw fishermen in the Philippines

- Cast nets - are round nets with small weights distributed around the edge. They are also called throw nets. The net is cast or thrown by hand in such a manner that it spreads out on the water and sinks. Fish are caught as the net is hauled back in. This simple device has been in use, with various modifications, for thousands of years.
- Drift nets - are nets which are not anchored. They are usually gillnets, and are commonly used in the coastal waters of many countries. Their use on the high seas is prohibited, but still occurs.
- Ghost nets - are nets that have been lost at sea. They can be a menace to marine life for many years.
- Gillnets - catch fish which try to pass through by snagging on the gill covers. Trapped, the fish can neither advance through the net nor retreat.
- Haaf nets - mainly used in the Solway Firth forming part of the border between England and Scotland. Brought to Great Britain by the Vikings a thousand years ago, the technique involves the fisherman wading out to deep waters with a large rectangular net and waiting for salmon to swim into it. The fish is then scooped up by the raising of the net.
- Hand nets - are small nets held open by a hoop. They have been used since antiquity. They are also called scoop nets, and are used for scooping up fish near the surface of the water. They may or may not have a handle–if they have a long handle they are called dip nets. When used by anglers to help land fish they are called landing nets. Because hand netting is not destructive to fish, hand nets are used for tag and release, or capturing aquarium fish.
- Lift nets - are a method of fishing using nets that are submerged to a certain depth and then lifted out of the water vertically. The nets can be flat or shaped like a bag, a rectangle, a pyramid, or a cone. Lift nets can be hand-operated, boat-operated, or shore-operated. They typically use bait or a light-source as a fish-attractor.
  - Cheena vala - are shore operated lift nets from India. Huge mechanical contrivances hold out horizontal nets with diameters of twenty metres or more. The nets are dipped into the water and raised again, but otherwise cannot be moved. Its name means "Chinese fishing net", though it originates from Southeast Asia.
  - Salambaw - a type of traditional raft or barge-operated large lift nets from the Philippines. It utilizes a tall upright pole or a tower structure (timba) around 15 to 20 m (49 to 66 ft) in height. At the top of the pole are two large curving spars crossed with each other. A large square net is attached to the ends of these spars. The pole acts as a crane, it can be tilted to submerge the net using a weighted lever mechanism. The operator either pushes or pulls the lever, or climbs on it to bring it down with their body weight, thus raising the pole. A variation of the salambaw operated from large outrigger boats is known as basnigan.
- Seine nets - are large fishing nets that can be arranged in different ways. In purse seining fishing the net hangs vertically in the water by attaching weights along the bottom edge and floats along the top. Danish seining is a method which has some similarities with trawling. A simple and commonly used fishing technique is beach seining, where the seine net is operated from the shore.
- Surrounding nets -
- Tangle nets - also known as tooth nets, are similar to gillnets except they have a smaller mesh size designed to catch fish by the teeth or upper jaw bone instead of by the gills.
- Trawl nets - are large nets, conical in shape, designed to be towed in the sea or along the sea bottom. The trawl is pulled through the water by one or more boats, called trawlers. The activity of pulling the trawl through the water is called trawling.

== Angling ==
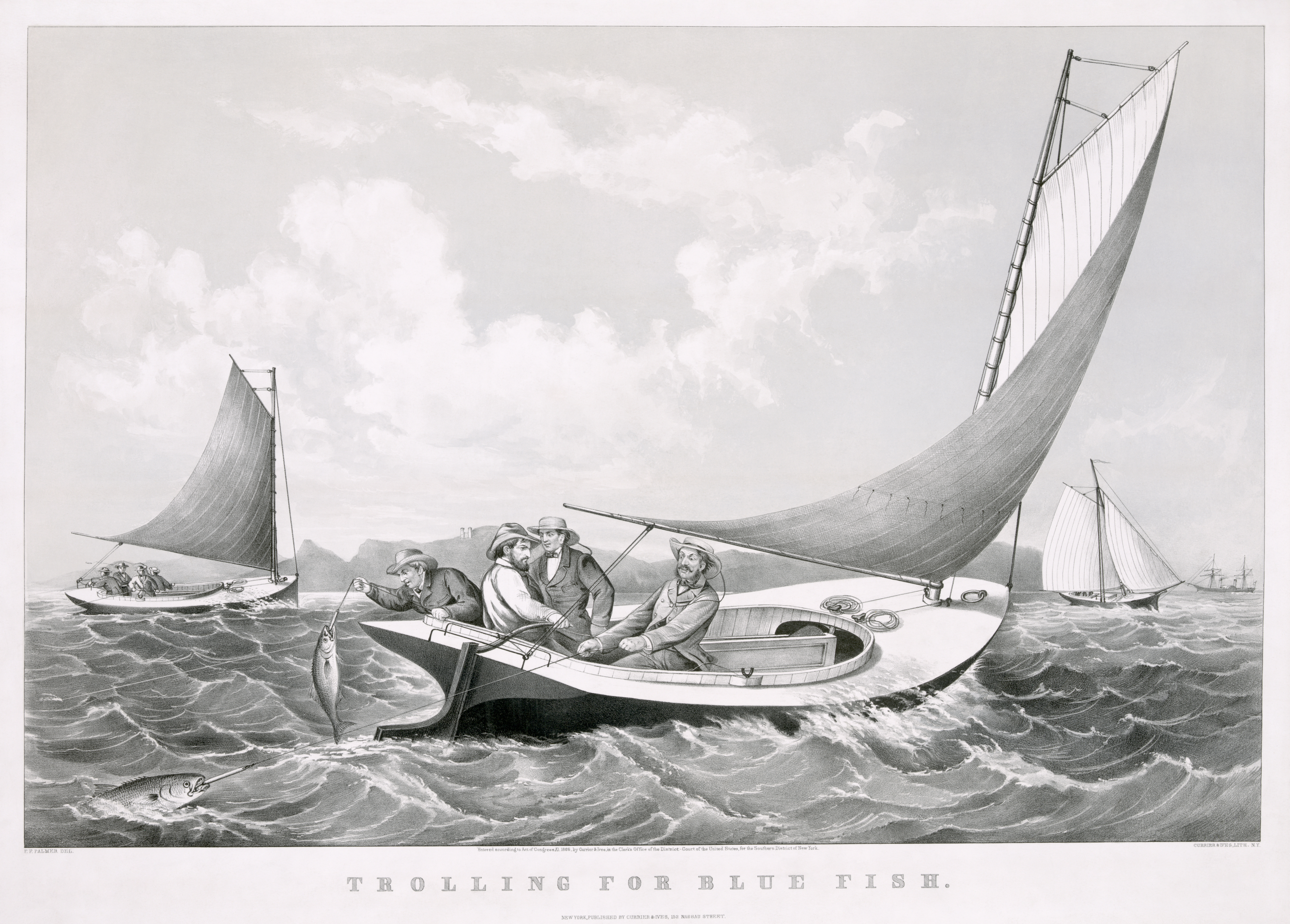
"Trolling for blue fish" lithograph by Currier & Ives, 1866

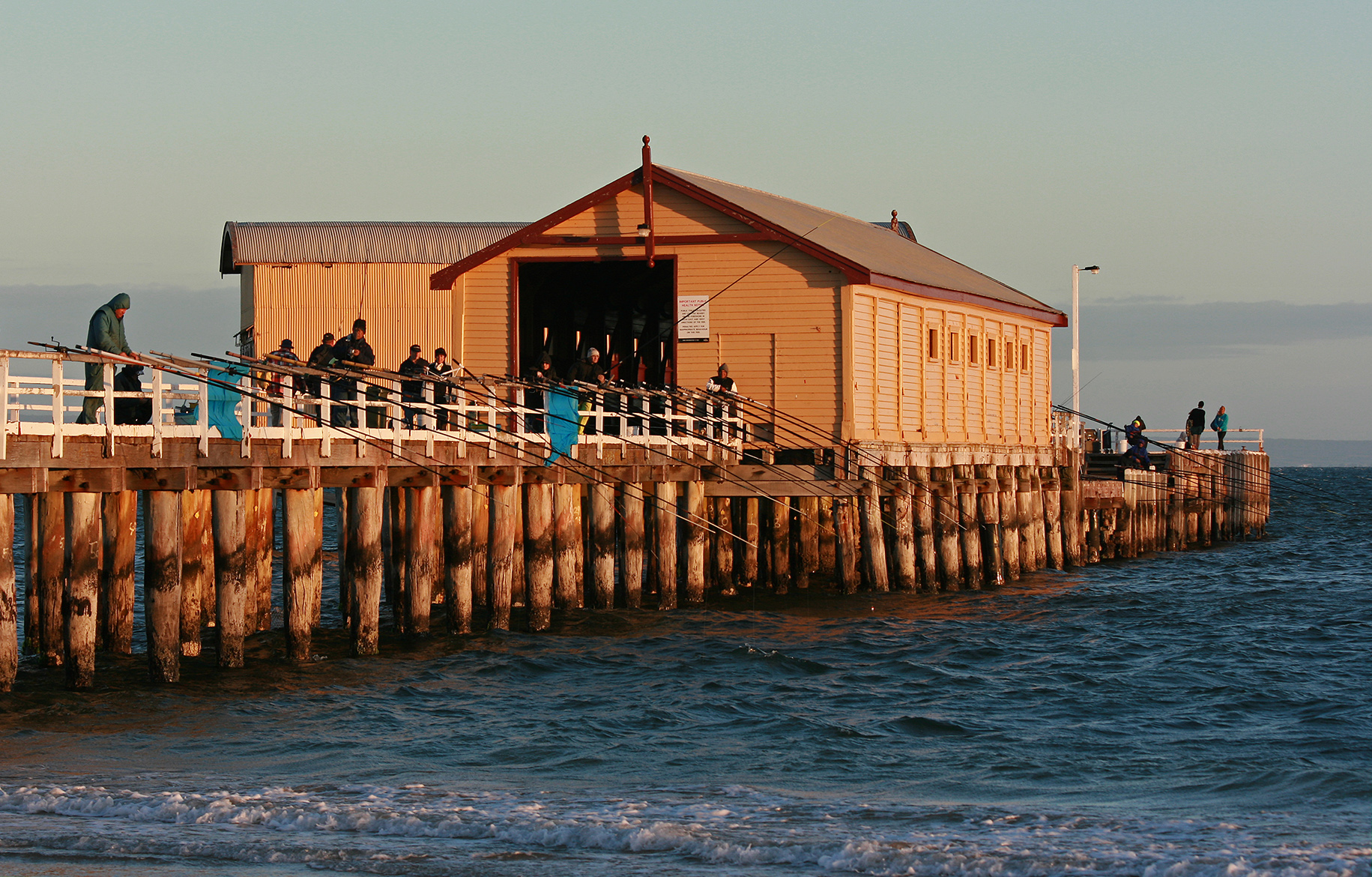
Fishermen using jiggerpoles for jigging from the Queenscliff pier

Angling is a method of fishing by means of an "angle" (fish hook). The hook is attached to a line, and is sometimes weighed down by a sinker so it sinks deeper in the water. This is the classic "hook, line and sinker" arrangement, used in angling since prehistoric times. The hook is usually dressed with lures or baits such as earthworm, doughball and bait fish.

Additional arrangements include the use of a fishing rod, which can be fitted with a reel, and functions as a delivery mechanism for casting the line. Other delivery methods for projecting the line include fishing kites and cannons, kontiki rafts and remote controlled devices. Floats can also be used to help set the line or function as bite indicators. The hook can be dressed with lures or bait. Angling is the principal method of sport fishing, but commercial fisheries also use angling methods involving multiple hooks, such as longlining or commercial trolling.

=== Line fishing ===
Line fishing is fishing with a fishing line, but not using rods. A fishing line is any cord made for fishing. Important parameters of a fishing line are its length, material, and weight (thicker, sturdier lines are more visible to fish). Factors that may determine what line an angler chooses for a given fishing environment include breaking strength, knot strength, UV resistance, castability, limpness, stretch, abrasion resistance, and visibility.

Modern fishing lines are usually made from artificial substances. The most common type is monofilament, made of a single strand. There are also braided fishing lines and thermally fused superlines.

- Droplining - a dropline consists of a long fishing line set vertically down into the water, with a series of baited hooks. Droplines have a weight at the bottom and a float at the top. They are not usually as long as longlines and have fewer hooks.
- Handlining - is fishing with a single fishing line, baited with lures or bait fish, which is held in the hands. Handlining can be done from boats or from the shore. It is used mainly to catch groundfish and squid, but smaller pelagic fish can also be caught.
- Pahila - is a traditional method of shoreline trolling in the Philippines. It uniquely uses baited hooks tied to a laterally flattened float called palyaw shaped like a small outrigger boat, a catamaran, or a fish. A long line is attached to the float. It is set unto the water's edge and dragged by someone running or walking along the beach. The combination of the water resistance and the diagonal pull forces the float outwards into deeper waters, like a kite. Once it reaches its maximum line length, it moves rapidly parallel to the person pulling it along the beach. It is pulled back to the shore intermittently to check for catches. Pahila literally means "pulled". It is also called subid-subid, sibid-sibid, paguyod, pahinas, hilada, or saliwsiw, among other names, in other Philippine languages.
- Jiggerpole - is a method of fishing for bass. It is built on using a cane pole with the line of at least 30lb. test, tied well down at the pole of about three quarters length in the typical cane pole manner, and then securely at the tip with about a foot to foot and a half length to drop in the water. Place a swivel on the end of the line. The trick is to linger the lure in a specific area going back and forth, maneuvering the tip of the cane pole in the water causing a noise to attract a bass to see a jig getting after a ripple of water the pole tip is causing.
- Jigging - is the practice of fishing with a jig, a type of fishing lure. A jig consists of a lead sinker with a hook molded into it and usually covered by a soft body to attract fish. Jigs are intended to create a jerky, vertical motion, as opposed to spinnerbaits which move through the water horizontally.
- Longlining - is a commercial technique that uses a long heavy fishing line with a series of hundreds or even thousands of baited hooks hanging from the main line by means of branch lines called "snoods". Longlines are usually operated from specialised boats called longliners. They use a special winch to haul in the line, and can operate in deeper waters targeting pelagic species such as swordfish, tuna, halibut and sablefish.
- Deadline - is the practice of leaving the baited line without a rod (usually over night) and returning for the fish later.

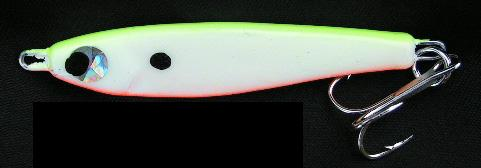
Slab

- Slabbing: is a bass fishing technique, that involves repetitively lifting and dropping a flat lure, usually made of 1 to 2.5 oz of lead painted to look like a baitfish (or heavy slabs of metal), through a school of actively feeding fish that the angler has located on a fishfinder. Used on white and striped bass in the reservoirs of the southern USA.
- Trolling - is fishing with one or more baited lines which are drawn through the water. This may be done by pulling the line behind a slow moving boat, or by slowly winding the line in when fishing from the land. Trolling is used to catch pelagic fish such as mackerel and kingfish.

External images
- Pelagic longline
- Dropline
- Trotline for catfish

- Trotlining - a trotline is like a dropline, except that a dropline has a series of hooks suspended vertically in the water, while a trotline has a series of hooks suspended horizontally in the water. Trotlines can be physically set in many ways, such as tying each end to something fixed, and adjusting the set of the rest of the line with weights and floats. They are used for catching crabs or fish, such as catfish, particularly across rivers.

=== Rod fishing ===
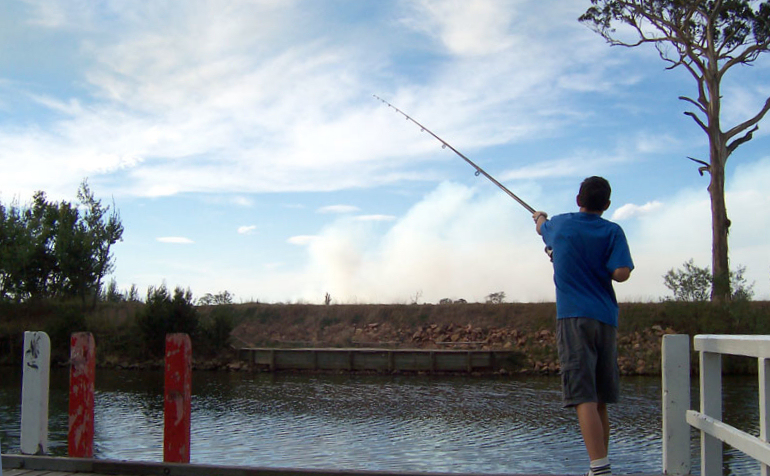
Angling with a rod.

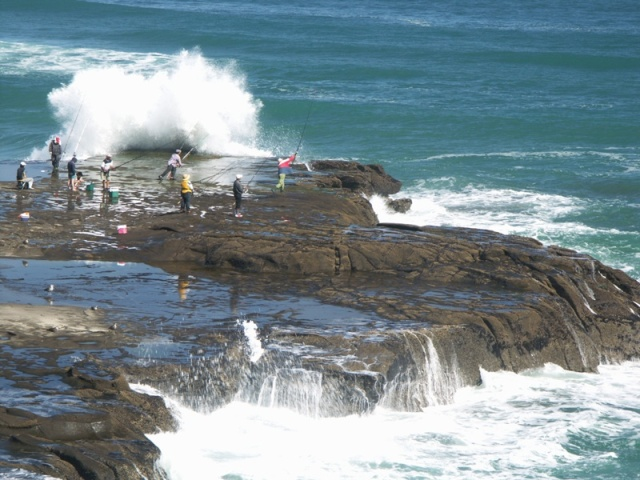
Extreme rock fishing off Muriwai Beach, New Zealand

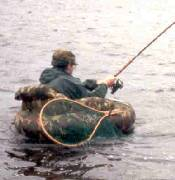
An angler in his float tube plays a hooked pike.

Angling with fishing rods give more control of the fishing line, and allows the bait/lure to be launched much farther than hand-throwing can reach. The rod is usually fitted with a fishing reel which functions as a mechanism for storing, retrieving and paying out the line. Floats may also be used, and can function as bite indicators. The hook can be dressed with lures or baits.

- Bank fishing - fishing from river banks and similar shorelines. Bank fishing is usually performed with a fishing rod and reel, although nets, traps, and spears can also be used. People who fish from a boat can sometimes access more areas in prime locations with greater ease than bank fishermen. However, many people do not own boats and find fishing from the bank has its own advantages. Bank fishing has its own requirements, and many things come into play for success, such as local knowledge, water depth, bank structure, location, time of day, and the type of bait and lures.
- Casting - the act of throwing the fishing line out over the water using a flexible fishing rod. The usual technique is for the angler to quickly flick the rod from behind toward the water. Casting is also a sport adjunct to fishing, much as shooting is to hunting. The sport is supervised by the International Casting Sport Federation, which sponsors tournaments and recognizes world records for accuracy and distance. Some variations of the technique exist, such as Surf fishing, the Reach cast, and Spey casting.
- Float tubes - small doughnut-shaped boats with an underwater seat in the "hole". Float tubes are used for fly fishing and enable the angler to reach deeper water without splashing and disturbing stillwater fish.
- Fly fishing - the use of artificial flies as lures. These are cast with specially constructed fly rods and fly lines. The fly line (today, almost always coated with plastic) is heavy enough cast in order to send the fly to the target. Artificial flies vary dramatically in size, weight and colour. Fly fishing is a distinct and ancient angling method, most renowned as a method for catching trout and salmon, but employed today for a wide variety of species including pike, bass, panfish, and carp, as well as marine species, such as redfish, snook, tarpon, bonefish and striped bass. There is a growing population of anglers whose aim is to catch as many different species as possible with the fly.
- Tenkara fishing - Tenkara is a form of fly fishing that originated in Japan over 200 years ago. It was originally done with a bamboo pole between 12' and 20' with the line tied directly on the tip of the rod requiring no reel. Modern tenkara rods are usually made of graphite and are telescopic. Unlike western style fly fishing tenkara uses either a tapered line or a level line and forgoes the PVC coated fly fishing line. Typical target species include trout and char but most smaller freshwater species can be caught by this method.
- Rock fishing - fishing from rocky outcrops into the sea. It is a popular pastime in Australia and New Zealand. It can be a dangerous pastime and claims many lives each year.
- Pitch Fishing - also known as “pitching” or “pitch fishing,” is a technique designed to deliver the lure quietly and at a distance over the water. The lure will fly high and far out over the water, landing in a loud splash. Pitch fishing involves sending the lure out a lower angle, and thus making a smaller splash but still loud as noted in the previous sentence, which will hopefully not scare the fish.
- Surfcasting - fishing from a shoreline using a rod to cast into the surf. With few exceptions, surf fishing is done in saltwater, often from a beach. The basic idea of most surfcasting is to cast a bait or lure as far out into the water as is necessary to reach the target fish from the shore. This may or may not require long casting distances and muscular techniques. Basic surf fishing can be done with a surfcasting rod between seven and twelve feet long, with an extended butt section, equipped with an appropriate spinning or conventional casting reel. Dedicated surfcasters usually possess an array of terminal and other tackle, with rods and reels of different lengths and actions, and lures and baits of different weights and capabilities. Depending on fishing conditions and the fish they are targeting, such surfcasters tailor bait and terminal tackle to rod and reel and the size and species of the fish. Reels and other equipment need to be constructed so they resist the corrosive and abrasive effects of salt and sand.

=== Other angling ===
- Bottom fishing - is fishing the bottom of a body of water. In the United Kingdom it is called "ledgering". A common rig for fishing on the bottom is a weight tied to the end of the line, with a hook about an inch up line from the weight. The method can be used both with hand lines and rods. There are fishing rods specialized for bottom fishing, called "donkas". The weight is used to cast or throw the line an appropriate distance. Bottom fishing can be done both from boats and from the land. It targets groundfish such as sucker fish, bream, catfish, and crappie.
- Ice fishing - is the practice of catching fish with lines and hooks through an opening in the ice on a frozen body of water. It is practised by hunter-gatherers such as the Inuit and by anglers in other cold or continental climates.
- Kayak fishing - has a long history, and has gained popularity in recent times. Many of the techniques used are the same as those used on other fishing boats, apart from difference is in the set-up, how each piece of equipment is fitted to the kayak, and how each activity is carried out on such a small craft.
- Kite fishing has long been used in China and by the people of New Guinea and other Pacific Islands. Kites can provide the fishermen access to waters that would otherwise be available only with boats. Similarly, for boat owners, kites provide a way to fish in areas where it is not safe to navigate such as shallows or coral reefs where fish may be plentiful. Kites can also be used for trolling a lure through the water. Suitable kites may be of very simple construction. Those of Tobi Island are a large leaf stiffened by the ribs of the fronds of the coconut palm. The fishing line may be made from coconut fibre and the lure made from spiders webs. Modern kitefishing is popular in New Zealand, where large delta kites of synthetic materials are used to fish from beaches, taking a line and hooks far out past the breakers. Kite fishing is also emerging in Melbourne where sled kites are becoming popular, both off beaches and off boats and in freshwater areas. The disabled community are increasingly using the kites for fishing as they allow mobility impaired people to cast the bait further out than they would otherwise be able to.
- Kontiki Fishing - is the practice of using either a Kontiki sailing raft, or a modern motorised torpedo device to pull a longline (up to 25 hooks) from the beach up to two thousand metres offshore. This method of fishing is very popular on the surf beaches of New Zealand. The electric kontikis can also be used to pull surfcasting lines and baits offshore, before releasing them to fish. Modern electric kontikis use electric trolling motors, lithium batteries and GPS controlled autopilots, and electric winches are used to retrieve the line, hooks and kontiki back to shore.
- Boat anglers - Fishing is usually done either from a boat or from a shoreline or river bank. When fishing from a boat, pretty much any fishing technique can be used, from nets to fish traps, but some form of angling is by far the most common. Compared to fishing from the land, fishing from a boat allows more access to different fishing grounds and different species of fish. Some tackle is specialised for boat anglers, such as sea rods.
- Remote control fishing - Fishing can also be done using a remote controlled boat. This type of fishing is commonly referred to as RC fishing. The boat is usually one to three feet long and runs on a small DC battery. A radio transmitter controls the boat. The fisherman connects the fishing line/bait to the boat; drives it; navigating the water by manipulating the remote controller. The technique is growing in popularity.
- Drone fishing - Rod fishing assisted by a drone, the drone can be a flying type or underwater type, it can be remote controlled by a human, computer, AI or a combination of the three simultaneously. The drone is used to scout for fish via camera, carry the hook to a far off location, cast the hook, reel in the fish and return. The degree of assistance is adjustable based on the model and configuration of drone used. This technique can be used to catch fish normally requiring a boat. Several US states, including Michigan and Oregon, have banned fishing with drones.

== Trapping ==
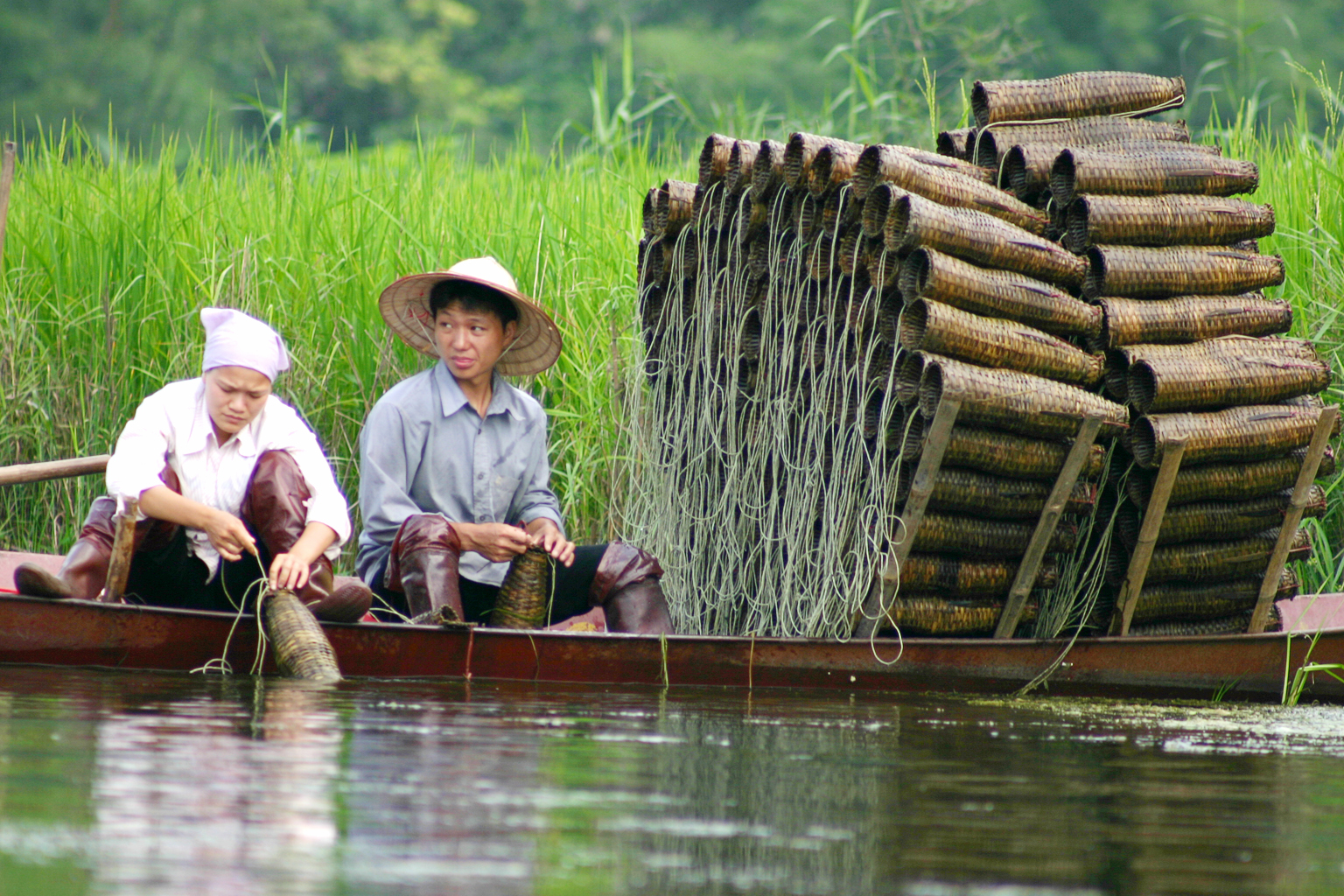
Fishermen with traditional fish traps, Hà Tây, Vietnam

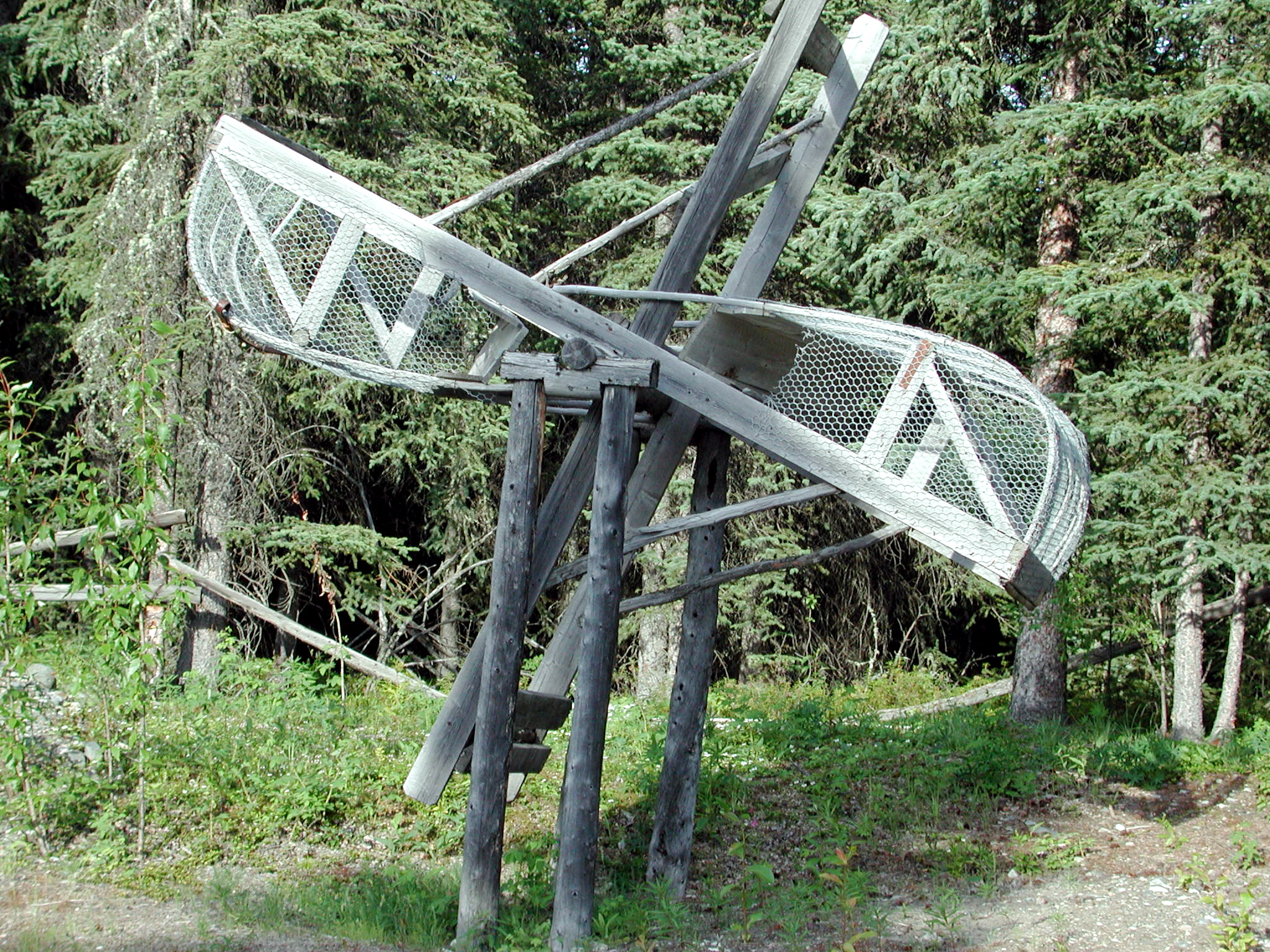
A typical wooden fish wheel

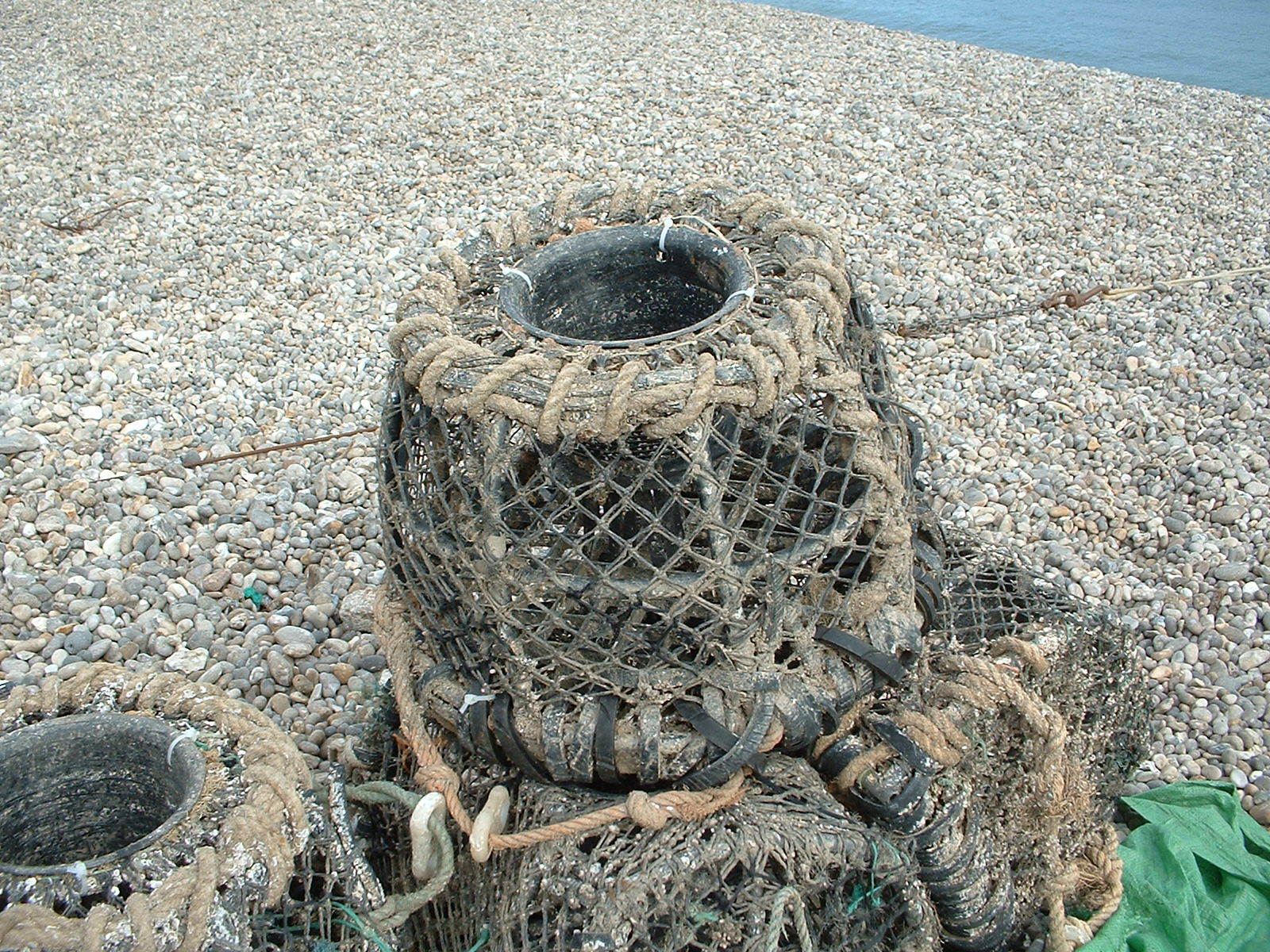
Lobster pots on the beach at Beer, Devon

Traps are culturally almost universal and seem to have been independently invented many times. There are essentially two types of trap, a permanent or semi-permanent structure placed in a river or tidal area and pot-traps that are baited to attract prey and periodically lifted.

- Artisanal techniques
  - Dam fishing - An artisanal technique called dam fishing is used by the Baka pygmies. This involves the construction of a temporary dam resulting in a drop in the water levels downstream—allowing fish to be easily collected.
- Basket weir fish traps - were widely used in ancient times. They are shown in medieval illustrations and surviving examples have been found. Basket weirs are about 2 m long and comprise two wicker cones, one inside the other—easy to get into and hard to get out.
- Fishing weir - In medieval Europe, large fishing weir structures were constructed from wood posts and wattle fences. V-shaped structures in rivers could be as long as 60 metres and worked by directing fish towards fish traps or nets. Such fish traps were evidently controversial in medieval England. Magna Carta includes a clause requiring that they be removed: "All fish-weirs shall be removed from the Thames, the Medway, and throughout the whole of England, except on the sea coast".
- Fish wheels - operate alongside streams, much as a water-powered mill wheel. A wheel complete with baskets and paddles is attached to a floating dock. The wheel rotates due to the current of the stream. The baskets on the wheel capture fish travelling upstream and transfer them into a holding tank. When the holding tank is full, the fish are removed.
- Lobster traps - also called lobster pots, are traps used to catch lobsters. They resemble fish traps, yet are usually smaller and consist of several sections. Lobster traps are also used to catch other crustaceans, such as crabs and crayfish. They can be constructed in various shapes, but the design strategy is to make the entry into the trap much easier than exit. The pots are baited and lowered into the water and checked frequently. Historically lobster pots were constructed with wood or metal. Today most traps are made from checkered wire and mesh. It is common for the trap to be weighted down with bricks. A bait bag is hung in the middle of the trap. In theory the lobster walks up the mesh and then falls into the wire trap. Bait varies from captain to captain but it is common to use herring. In commercial lobstering five to ten of these traps will be connected with line. A buoy marks each end of the string of pots. Two buoys are important to make retrieval easier and so captains do not set their traps over each other. Each buoy is painted differently so the various captains can identify their traps.

== Animals ==
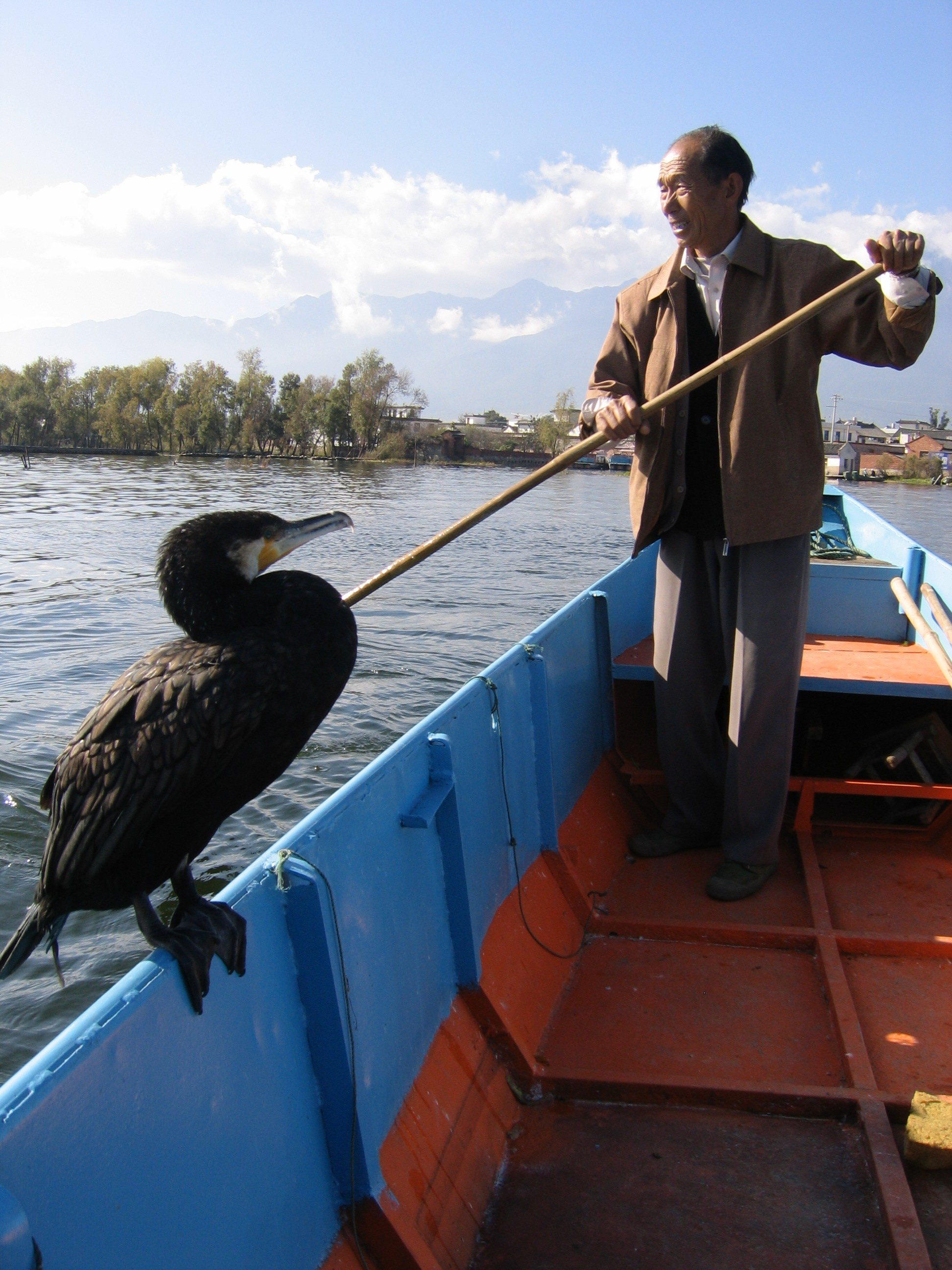
Chinese man with fishing cormorant.

- Cooperative human-dolphin fisheries date back to the ancient Roman author and natural philosopher Pliny the Elder. A modern human-dolphin fishery still takes place in Laguna, Santa Catarina, Brazil and a few other places in the world. In Laguna, men stand in shallow waters of the lagoon, or sit in canoes, forming a line, and waiting for the dolphins to appear. One or more resident dolphins drives fish towards the waiting fishermen. Then at a critical moment when the dolphins are close enough to the fishermen, one dolphin emerges from the water for an average duration of 1.4 seconds, performing a unique sequence of movements not otherwise seen in the wild. This sequence serves as a signal to the fishermen to cast their throw nets. The dolphins then feed off the fish that manage to escape the nets. In this unique form of fishing, the dolphins gain because the fish are disoriented and because the fish cannot escape to shallow waters where the larger dolphins cannot reach them. Likewise, studies show that fishermen casting their nets following the unique signal catch more fish than when fishing alone, without the involvement of the dolphins.
- Cormorant fishing - In China and Japan, the practice of cormorant fishing is thought to date back some 1300 years. Fishermen use the natural fish-hunting instincts of the cormorants to catch fish, but a metal ring placed round the bird's neck prevents large, valuable fish from being swallowed. The fish are instead collected by the fisherman.
- Frigatebirds fishing - The people of Nauru used trained frigatebirds to fish on reefs.
- Portuguese Water Dogs - Dating from the 16th century in Portugal, Portuguese Water Dogs were used by fishermen to send messages between boats, to retrieve fish and articles from the water, and to guard the fishing boats. Labrador Retrievers have been used by fishermen to assist in bringing nets to shore; the dog would grab the floating corks on the ends of the nets and pull them to shore.
- Remora fishing - The practice of tethering a remora, a sucking fish, to a fishing line and using the remora to capture sea turtles probably originated in the Indian Ocean. The earliest surviving records of the practice are Peter Martyr d'Anghera's 1511 accounts of the second voyage of Columbus to the New World (1494). However, these accounts are probably apocryphal, and based on earlier, no longer extant accounts from the Indian Ocean region.

== Other techniques ==
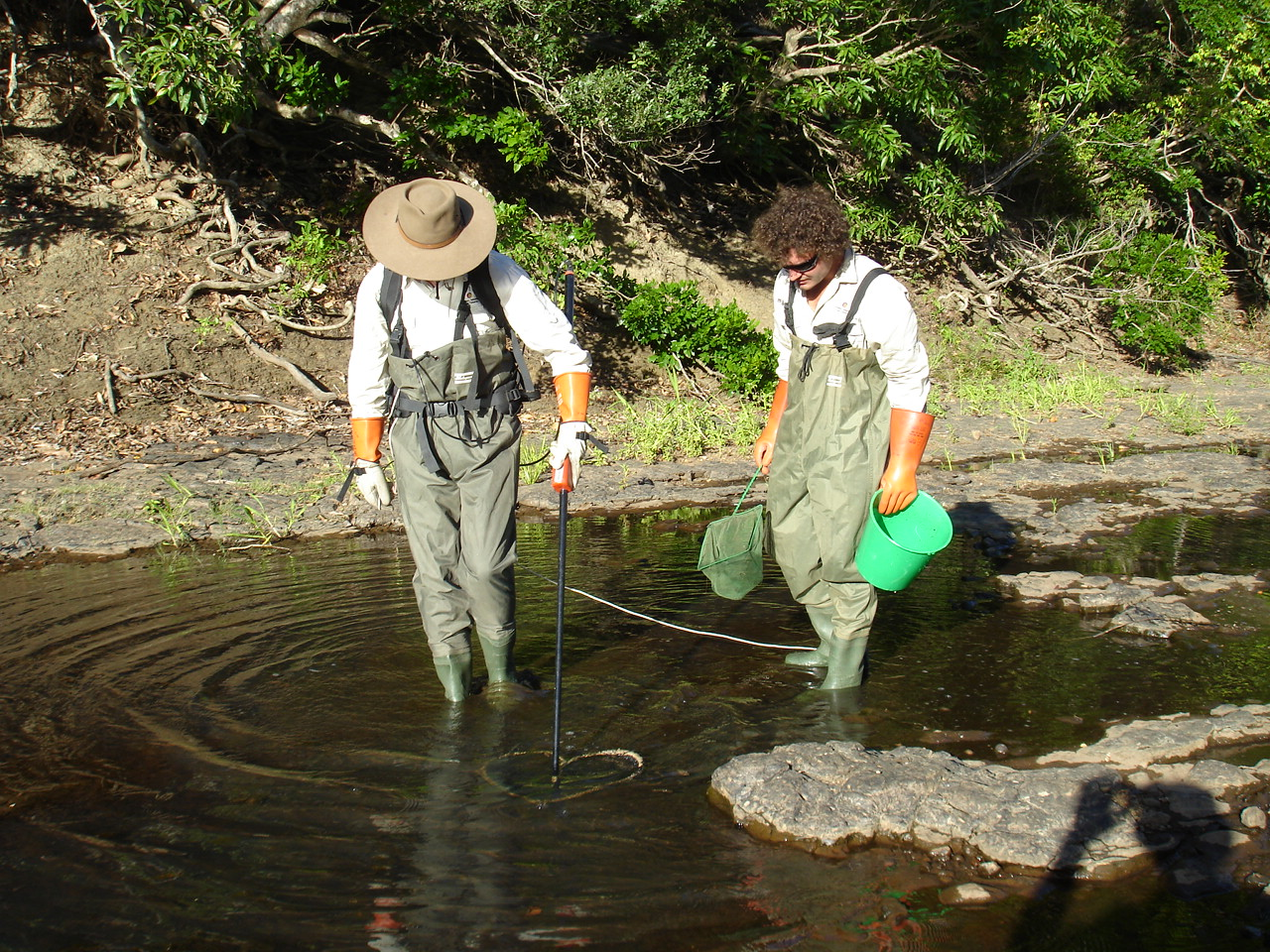
Scientists carrying out a population and species survey using electrofishing equipment

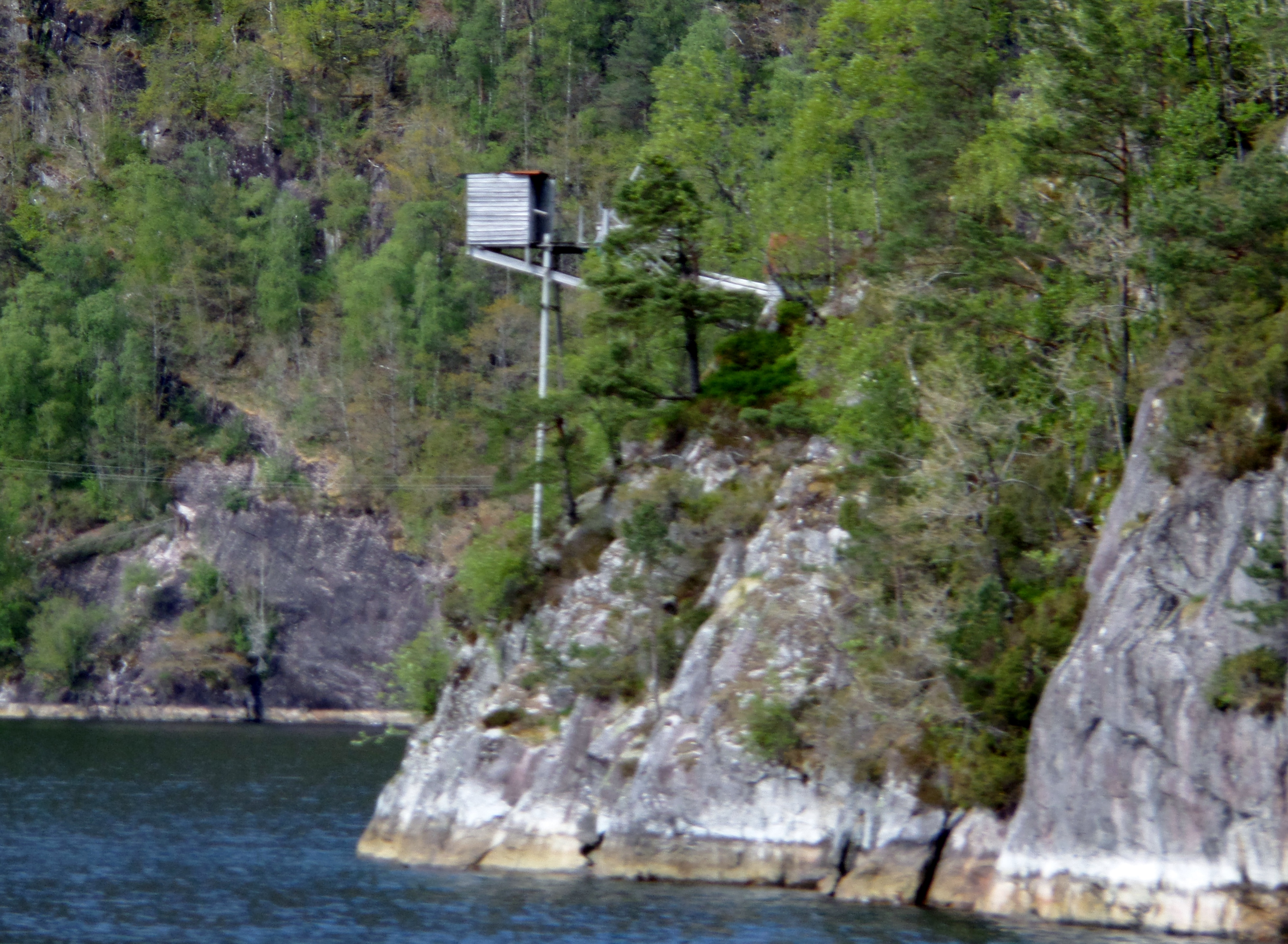
A laksegiljer in Osterfjord, Norway

- Basnig - a traditional method of fishing in the Philippines that combines the use of bag nets and attracting fish with high-powered lamps. Specialized outrigger boats known as basnigan are used.
- Electrofishing - is another recently developed technique, primarily used in freshwater by fisheries scientists. Electrofishing uses electricity to stun fish so they can be caught. It is commonly used in scientific surveys, sampling fish populations for abundance, density, and species composition. When performed correctly, electrofishing results in no permanent harm to fish, which return to their natural state a few minutes after being stunned.
- Fish aggregating devices - are man-made objects used to attract pelagic fish such as marlin, tuna and mahi-mahi (dolphin fish). They usually consist of buoys or floats tethered to the ocean floor with concrete blocks.
  - Lampuki nets - are an example of a traditional artisanal use of nets. Since Roman times, Maltese fishers have cut the larger, lower fronds from palm trees which they then weave into large flat rafts. The rafts are pulled out to sea by a luzzu, a small traditional fishing boat. In the middle of the day, lampuki fish (the Maltese name for mahi-mahi) school underneath the rafts, seeking the shade, and are caught by the fishers using large mesh nets.
- Dredging - There are types of dredges used for collecting scallops, oysters or sea cucumbers from the seabed. They have the form of a scoop made of chain mesh and they are towed by a fishing boat. Dredging can be destructive to the seabed, because the marine life is unable to survive the weight of the dredge. It is extremely detrimental to coral beds since they take centuries to rebuild themselves. Unmonitored dredging can be compared to unmonitored forest clearing, where it can wipe out ecosystems. Nowadays, this method of fishing is often replaced by mariculture or by scuba diving.
- Fish finders - are electronic sonar devices which indicate the presence of fish and fish schools. They are widely used by recreational fishermen. Commercially, they are used with other electronic locating and positioning devices.
- Fishing light attractors - use lights attached (above or underwater) to some structure to attract fish and bait fish. Fishing light attractor are operated every night. After a while, fish discover the increased concentration of bait surrounding the light. Once located, the fish return regularly, and can be harvested.
- Flossing - also called bottom bouncing. A method of angling usually used for salmon. It uses a hook and bait attached to a weighted bouncer dragged along the bottom of a stream or river.
- Harvesting machines - have recently been developed for commercial fishing. Harvesting machines use pumps to pump fish out of the sea. Dredges have also been mechanized so that they directly transfer mollusks to the surface as are dredged.
- Payaos - a type of fish aggregating device used in Southeast Asia, particularly in the Philippines. Payaos were traditionally bamboo rafts for handline fishing before World War II, but modern steel payaos use fish lights and fish location sonar to increase yields. While payaos fishing is sustainable on a small scale, the large scale, modern applications have been linked to adverse impacts on fish stocks.
- Shrimp baiting - is a method used by recreational fisherman for of catching shrimp. It uses a cast net, bait and long poles. The poles are used to mark a specific location and then bait is thrown in the water near the pole. After several minutes the cast net is thrown as close to the bait as possible and shrimp are caught in the net. In the 1980s the sport became popular in the southeastern coastal states of the US.
- Snagging, also known as snatching, jagging (in Australian English) or foul hooking, uses large, sharp, multi-pointed hooks tethered by a fishing line to pierce and grapple the fish externally. This is achieved by pulling the line out of the water very rapidly as soon as any movement is felt on the line, with the intention of impaling the hook point directly through the fish's skin and "clawing" firmly into the flesh like a gaff.
- Laksegiljer - small cabins standing on stilts where a fisherman sits. This method of fishing entails a net where the opening is controlled by a line tied to a rock. Under the cabin on the seabed is a white plank. When a salmon swims across the plank, the fisherman sees it and throws the rock into the water so the line closes the opening of the net, trapping the salmon. In Norway this method of fishing is banned, but in Osterfjord locals can obtain a special permit to use this method in order to maintain the old traditions.

== Destructive techniques ==
Destructive fishing practices are practices that easily result in irreversible damage to aquatic habitats and ecosystems. Many fishing techniques can be destructive if used inappropriately, but some practices are particularly likely to result in irreversible damage. These practices are mostly, though not always, illegal. Where they are illegal, they are often inadequately enforced. Some examples are:

=== Blast fishing ===
Dynamite or blast fishing is done easily and cheaply with dynamite or homemade bombs made from locally available materials. Fish are killed by the shock from the blast and are then skimmed from the surface or collected from the bottom. The explosions indiscriminately kill large numbers of fish and other marine organisms in the vicinity and can damage or destroy the physical environment. Explosions are particularly harmful to coral reefs. Blast fishing is also illegal in many waterways around the world.

=== Bottom trawling ===
Bottom trawling is trawling (towing a trawl, which is a fishing net) along the sea floor. It is also referred to as "dragging". The scientific community divides bottom trawling into benthic trawling and demersal trawling. Benthic trawling is towing a net at the very bottom of the ocean and demersal trawling is towing a net just above the benthic zone. Bottom trawling targets both bottom-living fish (groundfish) and semi-pelagic species such as cod, squid, shrimp, and rockfish.

Bottom fishing has operated for over a century on heavily fished grounds such as the North Sea and Grand Banks. While overfishing has long been recognised as causing major ecological changes to the fish community on the Grand Banks, concern has been raised more recently about the damage which benthic trawling inflicts upon seabed communities. A species of particular concern is the slow growing, deep water coral Lophelia pertusa. This species is home to a diverse community of deep sea organisms, but is easily damaged by fishing gear. On 17 November 2004, the United Nations General Assembly urged nations to consider temporary bans on high seas bottom trawling.

=== Cyanide fishing ===
Cyanide fishing is a method of collecting live fish mainly for use in aquariums, which involves spraying a sodium cyanide mixture into the desired fish's habitat in order to stun the fish. The practice hurts not only the target population, but also many other marine organisms, including coral and thus coral reefs.

Recent studies have shown that the combination of cyanide use and stress of post capture handling results in mortality of up to 75% of the organisms within less than 48 hours of capture. With such high mortality numbers, a greater number of fish must be caught in order to offset post-catch death.

=== Muro-ami ===
Muro-ami is a destructive artisan fishing method employed on coral reefs in Southeast Asia, traditionally in Myanmar. An encircling net is used with pounding devices, such as large stones fitted on ropes that are pounded onto the coral reefs. They can also consist of large heavy blocks of cement suspended above the sea by a crane fitted to the vessel. The pounding devices are repeatedly lowered into the area encircled by the net, smashing the coral into small fragments in order to scare the fish out of their coral refuges. The "crushing" effect on the coral heads has been described as having long-lasting and practically totally destructive effects.

== History ==
Ancient remains of spears, hooks and fish net have been found in ruins of the Stone Age. The people of the early civilization drew pictures of nets and fishing lines in their arts (Parker 2002). Early hooks were made from the upper bills of eagles and from bones, shells, horns and plant thorns. Spears were tipped with the same materials, or sometimes with flints. Lines and nets were made from leaves, plant stalk and cocoon silk. Literature on the indigenous fishing practices is very scanty. Baines (1992) documented traditional fisheries in the Solomon Islands. Use of the herbal fish poisons in catching fishes from fresh water and sea documented from New Caledonia (Dahl 1985). John (1998) documented fishing techniques and overall life style of the Mukkuvar fishing Community of Kanyakumari district of Tamil Nadu, India. Tribal people using various plants for medicinal and various purposes (Rai et al. 2000; Singh et al. 1997; Lin 2005) extends the use notion for herbal fish stupefying plants. Use of the fish poisons is very old practice in the history of human kind. In 1212, King Frederick II prohibited the use of certain plant piscicides, and by the 15th century similar laws had been decreed in other European countries as well (Wilhelm 1974). All over the globe, indigenous people use various fish poisons to kill the fishes, documented in America (Jeremy 2002) and among Tarahumara Indian (Gajdusek 1954).
