= Payao =

Payao is not to be confused with the Thai town of Phayao. Payao may refer to:

- Payao, the term the locals use for the Banaue Rice Terraces
- Payao, Zamboanga Sibugay, a municipality in the Province of Zamboanga Sibugay
- Payao (fishing), a traditional fish aggregating device from the Philippines
