= Bouncing Betty (disambiguation) =

Bouncing Betty is the Allied nickname for an S-mine, a German bounding mine used in the 1930s and 1940s.

Bouncing Betty may also refer to:

- Bouncing Betty, a fictional character in the X-Men story arc "X-Men: Nation X"
- Bouncing Betty Records, a punk-rock label whose catalog includes The Scarred
- Bouncing betty (angling), a type of lead weight used by a flosser

== See also ==
- "The Bouncing Betty Caper", an episode of the radio series The Adventures of Sam Spade
- The Case of the Bouncing Betty, a 1957 novel by Michael Avallone in the Ace mystery double series
- Bouncing Bet or Common Soapwort, a vespertine flower
