= Snagging =

Fishing technique

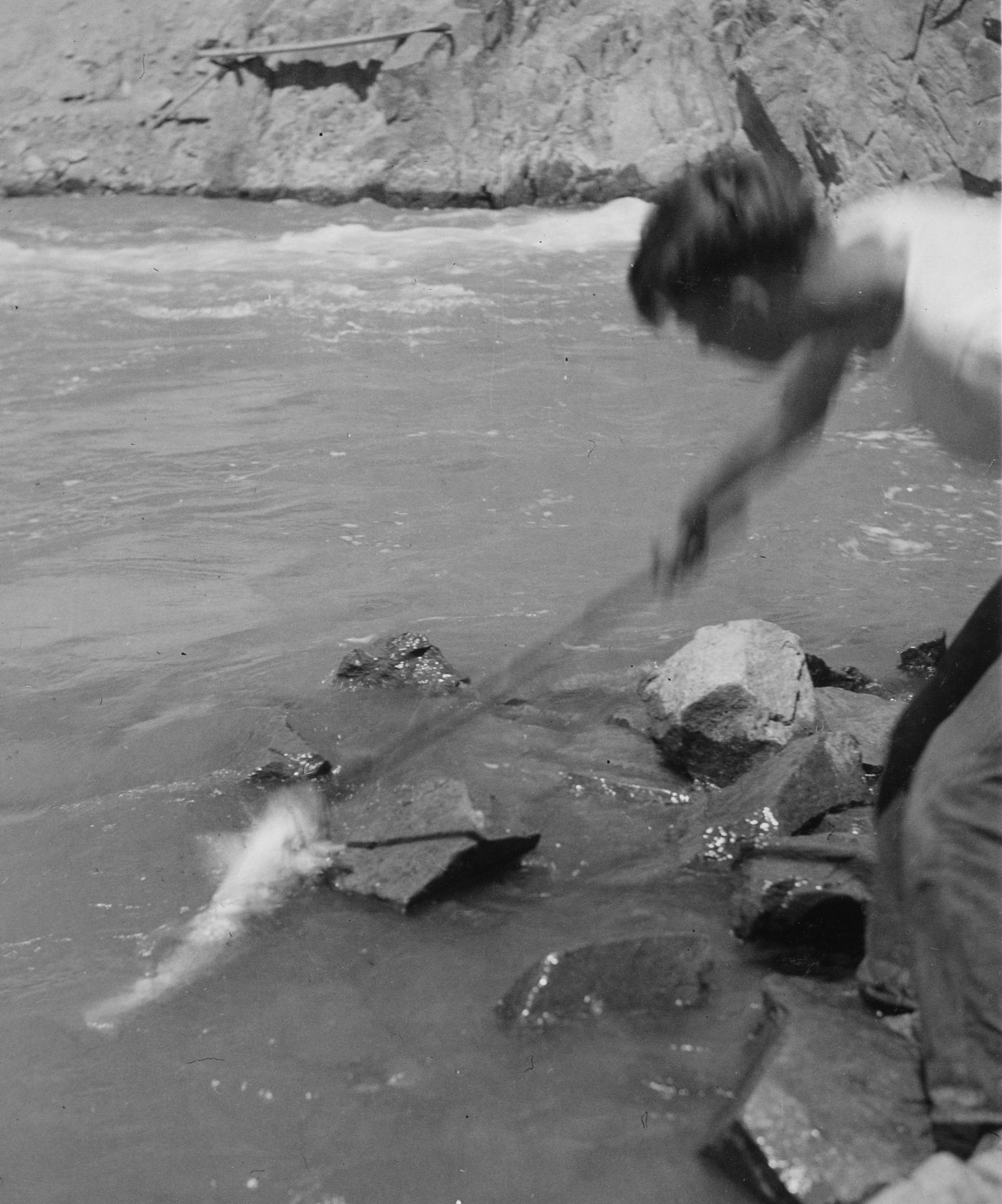
Snagging chinook salmon

Snagging, also known as snag fishing, snatching, snatch fishing, jagging (Australia and New Zealand), or foul hooking, is a fishing technique for catching fish that uses sharp grappling hooks tethered to a fishing line to externally impale (i.e. "snag") into the flesh of the fish, without needing the fish to swallow any hook with its mouth like in angling. This is achieved by suddenly and vigorously pulling the line (either by handlining or with a rod) when movement is felt, causing the snag hook to "claw" into and grapple any nearby fish like a gaff. Weighted multi-hook rigs can be used to increase chances of success, and modern technologies such as underwater video camera can also be used to visually aid and time the snagging.

Some herbivorous/algaevorous fish species, such as paddlefish, are not attracted to normal angling baits or lures as they primarily filter-feed on plankton. While these fish can be caught using nets, spears or pole hooks, snagging is also used as a less strenuous and more versatile technique. There are also some species of salmon that can be legally harvested by snagging, and are targeted as they migrate upstream to spawn, making them easier to target, and at a time when the fish are at the end of their life cycle.

For fish species that can be enticed easily with angling baits or lures, snagging techniques are often discouraged or prohibited as it causes far more mutilating injuries to the fish (especially to the gills and vital internal organs), which causes significant bleeding and infection risks that diminish the fish's chance of survival even after catch and release. Snagging, especially if using underwater video guidance, is viewed in many recreational fishing communities as an unethical practice violating the principle of fair chase, and has been associated with overfishing (especially with multi-hook snag rigs) and other social controversies concerning animal cruelty. In certain countries and regions, the technique is deemed illegal by local fisheries law.

== Technique ==
After first casting a hook into the water, a snagger will wait until a fish is sighted, at which time they will reel in the hook until it is positioned above the fish. Once the fish is in line with the hook, the snagger then yanks on the line to "snag" the fish before attempting to reel it in. When fishing in a clear river, most snaggers will be able to observe their target's shadow or wake in the water to determine where their hooks need to be and when. To keep view of the hook, some snaggers use a brightly colored ribbon or cloth near the hook.

== Legality ==
=== United States ===
Snagging, like other methods of fishing, is controlled by the wildlife regulating agency of each state. A list of the legality for each state follows.

State	Status
Alabama	Prohibited, with exceptions
Alaska	Prohibited, with exceptions
Arizona	Prohibited, with exceptions
Arkansas	Prohibited, with exceptions
California	Prohibited, with exceptions
Colorado	Prohibited, with exceptions
Connecticut	Prohibited, with exceptions
Delaware	Prohibited, with exceptions
District of Columbia	Illegal
Florida	Permitted for certain species, except in certain areas
Georgia	Illegal
Hawaii	Legal, but prohibited in certain areas
Idaho	Illegal
Illinois	Legal for some species during certain seasons
Indiana	Illegal
Iowa	Prohibited, with exceptions
Kansas	Legal for paddlefish
Kentucky	Legal for some species
Louisiana	Prohibited, with exceptions
Maine	Prohibited, with exceptions
Maryland	Illegal
Massachusetts	Illegal
Michigan	Illegal
Minnesota	Illegal
Mississippi	Unknown
Missouri	Prohibited, with exceptions
Montana	Prohibited, with exceptions
Nebraska	Prohibited, with exceptions
Nevada	Prohibited, with exceptions
New Hampshire	Prohibited in freshwater
New Jersey	Prohibited, with exceptions
New Mexico	Prohibited, with exceptions
New York	Prohibited, with exceptions
North Carolina	Illegal
North Dakota	Prohibited, with exceptions
Ohio	Prohibited, with exceptions
Oklahoma	Prohibited, with exceptions
Oregon	Prohibited, with exceptions
Pennsylvania	Illegal
Rhode Island	Illegal
South Carolina	Legal, but prohibited in certain areas
South Dakota	Prohibited, with exceptions
Tennessee	Prohibited, with exceptions
Texas	Illegal
Utah	Illegal
Vermont	Illegal
Virginia	Illegal
Washington	Illegal
West Virginia	Permitted for certain species
Wisconsin	Illegal
Wyoming	Illegal

=== United Kingdom ===
In the United Kingdom, the use of a stroke-haul or snatch, which includes any device designed to foul-hook salmon, trout or other freshwater fish, is prohibited by Section 1 of the Salmon and Freshwater Fisheries Act 1975. However, this legislation rationalised a number of previous Acts of Parliament, and the use of such devices was originally banned in 1851, although at the time it only applied to the taking of salmon and trout, but was subsequently extended to include all freshwater fish. The logic behind this was that foul-hooking was not a method that was legitimate either for commercial or sporting purposes, but was used by poachers, and this was reiterated by the Bledisloe Report published in 1961.

== See also ==
- Flossing
