= Dropline =

Commercial fishing device

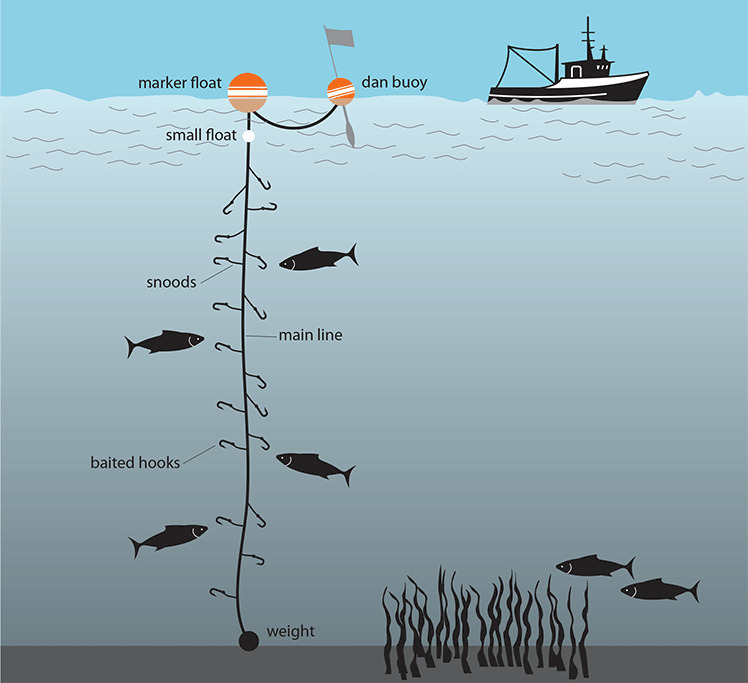
Droplining

A dropline is a commercial fishing rig consisting of a long fishing line set vertically down into the water, with a series of baited hooks attached to the ends of side-branching secondary lines called snoods. Dropline fishing, or droplining, is a specialized angling technique.

Droplines may be set either down underwater trenches or just into the open water column. They have a weight at the bottom of the line and are fixed to the water surface at least one float at the top. They are usually not as long as longlines and have fewer hooks.

Droplines can be contrasted with trotlines. Whereas a dropline has a series of hooks suspended sideways off a vertical mainline, a trotline has a series of hooks suspended vertically off a horizontal mainline.

== Conservation impacts ==
A concern for marine conservation is that droplines are able to access areas that are otherwise natural fish refuges, such as deep sea canyons and seamounts.

The Australian Marine Conservation Society rates dropline fishing as having a "moderate impact" on wildlife and a "low impact" on marine habitats.

Droplines have the potential to interact with orcas (killer whales). There is predation by orcas on commercial longline and dropline fish catches, including around Tasmania, Bering Sea and Prince William Sound areas, causing significant financial loss to commercial fishers, and threat to orcas, which can become caught or entangled, exposed to ship strikes when moving or migrating, or suffer retaliation from fishers. Retaliation in response to predation on fish catches in previous decades has included shooting and harpooning of orcas.
