= Remote control fishing =

Remote control fishing is a fishing technique accomplished by using a remote control boat. The remote control fishing boats are almost exclusively battery operated, since batteries provide several benefits when compared with glow engines: less noise during operation, consume no power during idle time, requires no oxygen, easier to maintain, finer power and speed control, etc.

== Remote Control Fishing Boats ==
Remote control fishing boats are either modified RC boats or custom build RC fishing boats. Theoretically, as long as a fishing line can be attached to the remote control boat, any remote control boat can be used. But, good electric RC fishing boat should be:

- water tight up to a certain depth - if pulled down by larger fish, it should stay operational after being submerged,

- visible from long distances - if fishermen lose the RC boat out of sight, it is very hard to bring it back again,

- have enclosed propellers or small jets - fishing lines, sea-grass and various debris can get entangled around unprotected propellers and can prevent the RC boat from operating normally,

- rudder should be omitted or should be enclosed with propellers - if two electric engines are used, rudder can be omitted and boat steering is done using electric motors,

- have low center of gravity - boat is stable and can handle bad weather, waves and wind,

- should be mono-hull - mono-hull RC boats with low center of gravity always position them properly (even after being fully upside down) and, if they are water tight, can resume operation right away. Catamaran RC fishing boats are very stable boats, but when turned upside-down due to wind, waves, fish etc., they are unable to return to proper position on their own. Regardless of hull type, hulls should be strong, durable and water tight and should be able to withstand hits and impacts with boats, debris, rocks etc.

- batteries should be swapped easily, with minimum tools required. NiMh batteries are common in most RC boats, with NiCd batteries being slowly phased-out due to environmental concerns, battery memory effect, lower capacity and generally being inferior to NiMh batteries. High-end models of RC boats are mostly powered with strong, lightweight and expensive lithium polymer batteries.

- electric motors should be brushless electric motors. Brushless motors are more expensive and require more complex motor controllers, but they require less maintenance and are more reliable than brushed electric motors,

- boat should be able to achieving various (trolling) speeds, not just to have simple motors 'off and on'.

etc.

== Fishing Methods ==
There are several fishing methods that are usually employed:

- A section of fishing line and baited hook are permanently attached to a remote control boat. Using remote control, bait is positioned on desired location and fishermen either wait for a fish to strike or use RC boat for trolling. The limitation of this method is if a big fish is hooked, there is a risk of the fish pulling the remote control boat underwater.

- Attach a line release mechanism to the RC boat and then attach the line/hook and (instead of casting) drive the line out with the RC boat. When a fish strikes, the line disconnects, and the fisherman reels in the fish with a regular fishing pole. This allows the fisherman to catch any size fish.

- Similar to the previous method; RC fishing boat is equipped with line release mechanism and when on desired position, line is released by fishing rod strike or by remote command. After fishing line is released, RC boat is retrieved using remote control or even automatically using some sort of homing system (ultra sound, infra red, GPS, etc.).

RC fishing methods are limited only by imagination of RC fishing boat users.

== Line Release Mechanism ==
Line release mechanism can be attached to any suitable RC boat. Instead of using fast electric RC boats, slower, but stronger and more durable RC boats should be used. Line release mechanism is mounted on the stern of the boat, so that the fishing line stays clear of propellers, rudders, antenna and any other protrusions.

Also, line release mechanism can be improvised using various methods, mostly using ordinary plastic clothespin requiring some testing before such system can be actually used.

== Legal status ==
There is debate about whether RC fishing should be legal. Most states will allow it if the line disconnects when a fish is hooked to the boat, and the fisherman reels in the fish with a fishing pole. When the RC boat is used to pull in the fish, it may be illegal unless on private property.

== See also ==
- Radio-controlled boat
- RC servo
- Model boat
