= Lampuki netting =

Fishing technique

Lampuki is the Maltese name for the dorado or mahi-mahi, a kind of fish that migrates past the Maltese islands during the autumn. The fishing season for lampuki is from 15 August through to the end of December, in accordance with Article 12 of Regulation (EU) No. 1343/2011 of the European Parliament and of the Council of 13 December 2011.

Fishermen cut and gather the larger, lower fronds from palm trees which they then weave into large flat rafts. The rafts are pulled out to sea, usually with the small traditional fishing boats known as luzzu, but can also be pulled out to sea by using larger modern fishing boats. Around midday, lampuki school underneath the rafts, seeking the shade. The fishermen first stay 5–10 metres away from the raft and repeatedly go around the raft pulling a silicone squid jig behind them until they catch something; they then leave the lampuka (dorado, mahi-mahi) hanging off the side of the boat until other fish come and school next to it; then a mesh net is thrown over the schooling fish. This method is known as kannizzati and has not changed significantly since Roman times. The lampuki are used both for local consumption as well as export.

== See also ==
- Fish aggregating device
- Payao (fishing)
