= Fish aggregating device =

Man-made object used to attract ocean-going pelagic fish

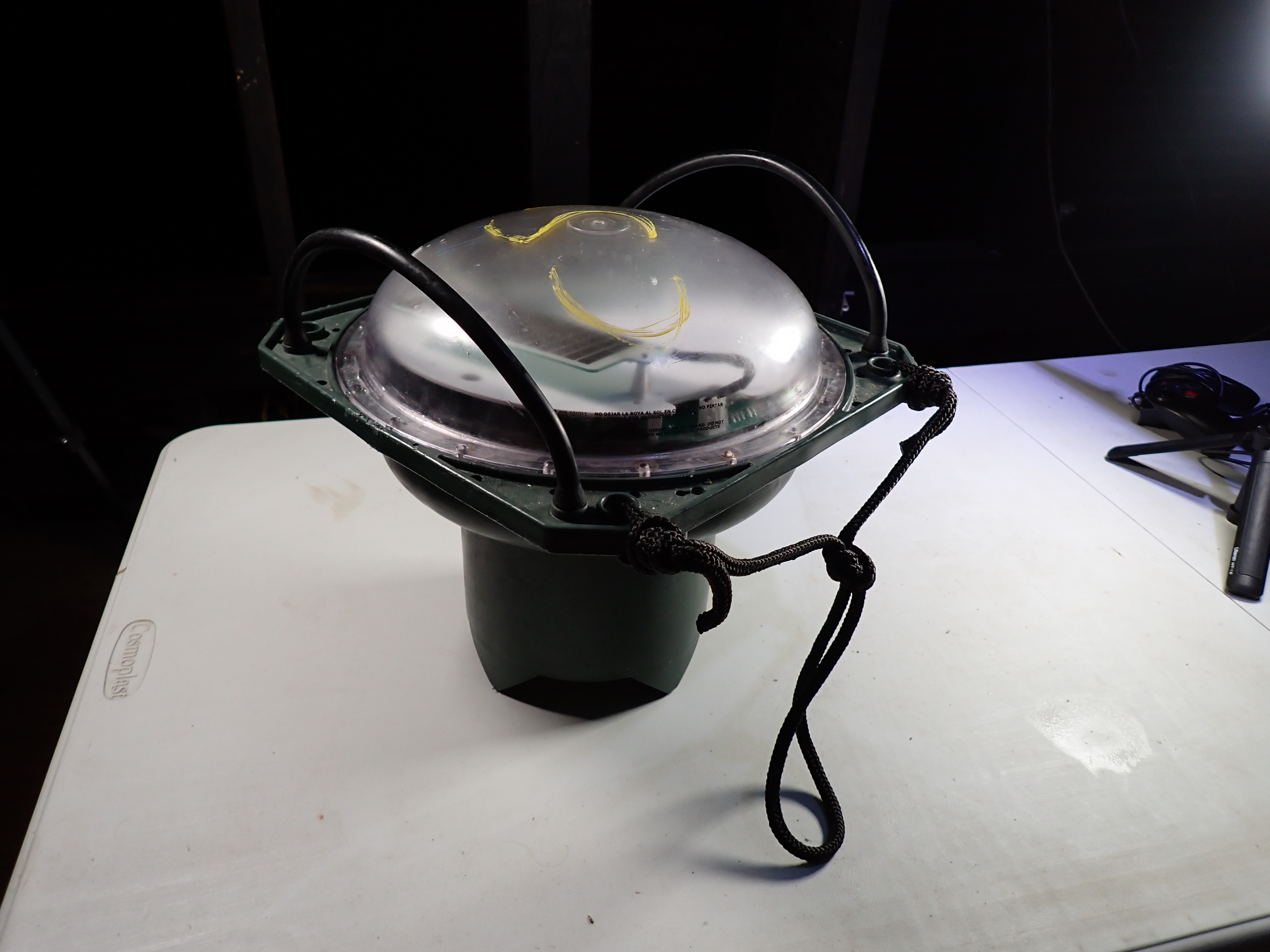
Echo sounder buoy example model 1

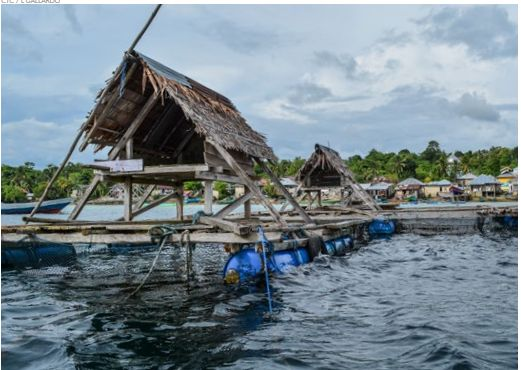
Indonesian rumpon

A fish aggregating (or aggregation) device (FAD) is a man-made object used to attract pelagic fish such as marlin, tuna and mahi-mahi (dolphin fish). They usually consist of buoys or floats tethered to the ocean floor. Various types of FADs have been employed in the traditional fishing cultures of Island Southeast Asia (especially in the Philippines), Japan, and Malta for centuries. Modern FADs are increasingly being used in modern commercial and sport fishing.

== Fish behaviour ==
Fish are fascinated with floating objects, which they use to mark locations for mating activities. They aggregate around objects such as drifting flotsam, rafts, jellyfish and floating seaweed. The objects appear to provide a "visual stimulus in an optical void", and offer refuge for juvenile fish from predators. The juvenile fish, in turn attract predators. A study using sonar in French Polynesia, found large shoals of juvenile bigeye tuna and yellowfin tuna aggregated closest to the devices, at distances of 10 to 50m. Further out, 50 to 150m, a less dense group of larger yellowfin and albacore tuna gathered. Yet further out, to 500m, was a dispersed group of mature tuna. The distribution and density of these groups was variable and overlapped. The FADs were also used by other fish, and the aggregations dispersed after dark.

== Types ==
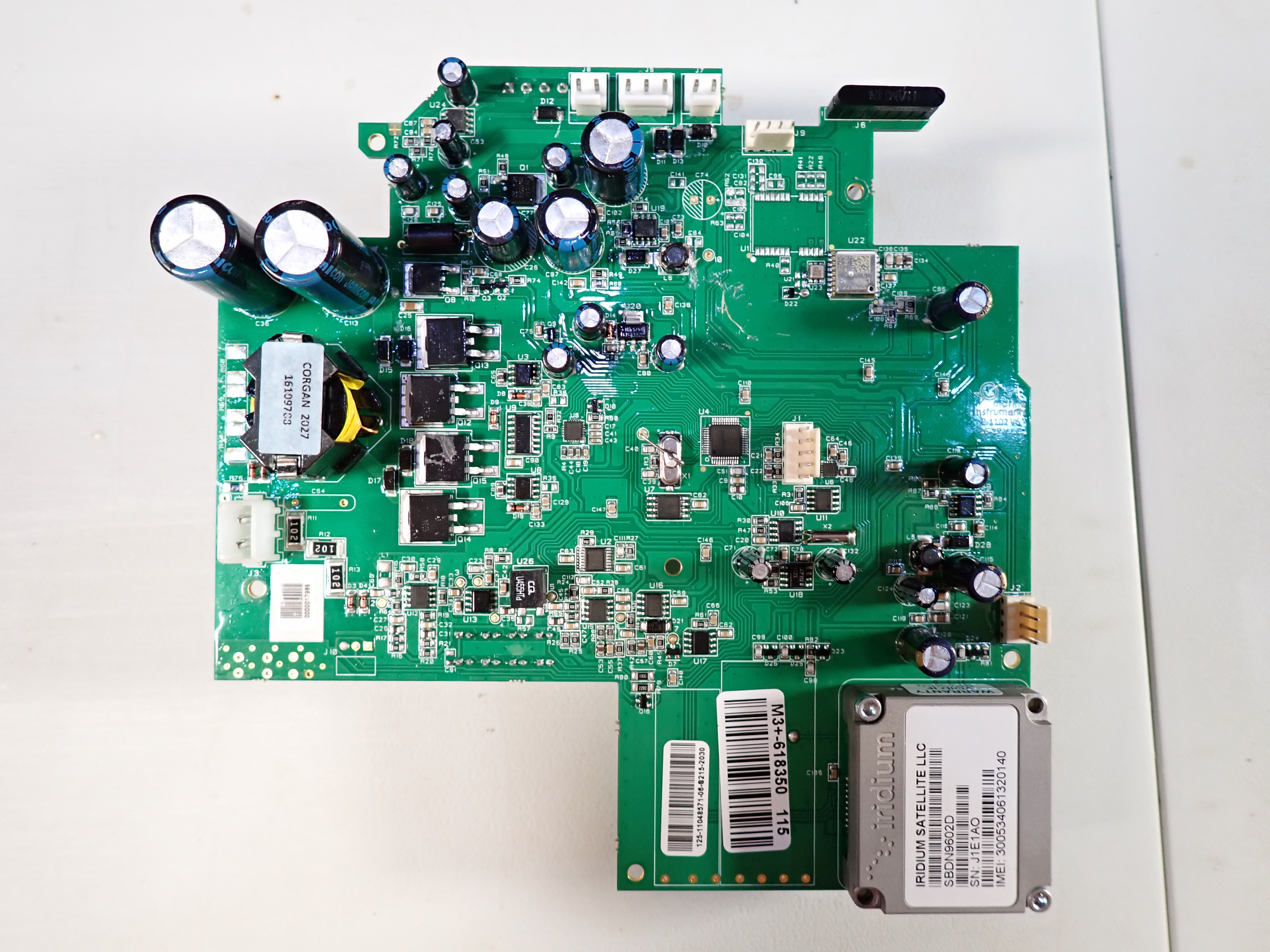
An example echo sounder buoy printed circuit board.

Drifting FADs float with the currents, are not tethered to the bottom and can be man made, or natural objects such as logs or driftwood. They can include sonar and GPS capabilities so that operators can contact it via satellite to assess associated populations.

Moored FADs occupy a fixed location and attach to the sea bottom using a weight such as a concrete block. A rope attaches to the mooring and in turn attaches to a buoy. The buoy can float at the surface (lasting 3–4 years) or lie subsurface to avoid detection and surface hazards such as weather and ship traffic. Subsurface FADs last longer (5–6 years) due to less wear and tear, but can be harder for fishers to locate. In some cases the upper section of rope is made from metal chain so that if the buoy detaches from the rope, the rope sinks and thereby avoids damage to passing ships.

== Traditional FADs ==
Fish aggregating devices have been traditionally used for centuries by fishermen in Island Southeast Asia, Japan, and Malta.

They are most widespread in the Philippines where traditional FADs are known as payao. Payao are semi-permanent bamboo rafts anchored to the seafloor with rocks. They are usually placed in very deep water, but coastal and shallow-water versions also exist. The rafts are around 4 m (13 ft) long, 1.5 m (4.9 ft) wide, and tapering at one end. Beneath the raft are palm fronds (usually coconut or nipa palm) suspended with weights, usually to a depth of 30 m (98 ft). They have several variants, including simple horizontal bamboo bundles or flat bamboo rafts with attached trailing palm fronds (bonbon), to vertical bamboo bundles with palm fronds on the upper end and "roots" on the submerged end (arong), to double-layered rafts where palm fronds are present both underwater and above-water.

Modern payao have cylindrical, bullet-shaped, or rectangular steel floats that can better withstand rough seas, with cement anchors sunk to depths of up to 5,000 m (16,000 ft) deep. They are harvested using handline fishing, surface trolling, or small-scale purse seining. They are traditionally used to catch pelagic fish (like tuna, mackerel scad, and kawakawa). Payaos can produce catches of up to 200 metric tons of fish. There are thousands of payao anchored in dense networks throughout the Philippines. Payao FADs have been introduced to traditional fishermen in Vietnam, Thailand (where it is known as sung), Fiji, the Solomon Islands, the Federated States of Micronesia, Papua New Guinea, and other countries in Oceania.

In Indonesia, Malaysia, Timor-Leste, and among the Moken people of Myanmar, a very similar traditional method is known as rumpon or roempon in Malay. It uses an anchored bamboo raft supporting a lure line with palm leaves or bundles of grass attached along its length. Fish attracted to the rumpon are caught using dip nets or encircling nets.

In Japan, fishermen use drifting rafts of bamboo bundles to attract mahi-mahi, which are then caught by encircling nets. In Malta, a very similar method (known as kannizzati) is also used to catch mahi-mahi and pilot fish, using anchored flat cork rafts that are then harvested by encircling nets, long lines, or trolling. In modern times, kannizzati rafts are often made from polystyrene with attached palm fronds harvested from introduced Canary Island date palms (Phoenix canariensis).

== Applications ==
=== Fisheries ===
Drifting FADs are widespread in the Atlantic, Pacific and Indian Ocean purse seine fisheries. They attract over 1 million tons of tuna (nearly one-third of the global tuna total) and over 100,000 tons of by-catch as of 2005. Skipjack (Katsuwonus pelamis), bigeye tuna (Thunnus obesus) and yellowfin (Thunnus albacares) tuna are the three primary tuna species that FADs target. Other targets include albacore, dolphin fish, wahoo, blue marlin, striped marlin, mako shark, silky shark, whitetip shark, galapagos shark, mackerel, and bonito.

Before FADs, commercial tuna fishing used purse seining to target surface-visible aggregations of birds and dolphins, which were a reliable signal of the presence of tuna schools below. The demand for dolphin-safe tuna was a driving force for FADs. Both recreational and commercial fisheries use FADs.

Increasing FAD since 1990 increased the productivity of the fishing fleet, but has significant side-effects. The average FAD-caught fish is smaller and comes with relatively large bycatch, raising concern about populations of pelagic sharks.

The U.S. state of Hawaiʻi operates 55 surface FADs around its islands to support sport fishing and marine research.

=== Marine Protected Areas ===
Blue water FADs can enhance the effectiveness of marine protected areas by retaining fish within MPAs (where fishing is prohibited) long enough to benefit local fish populations. One study reported that even a small number can meaningfully expand populations.

== Removal ==
In the Indian Ocean some NGOs want to reduce the impact of pollution and coral degradation by removing FADs that have drifted onto and damaging corals. Oceanika, a UN registered NGO, launches regular removal missions.

== See also ==
- Artificial reef
- Biorock
- Marine debris
- Multi-purpose reef
