= Trotline =

Type of heavy fishing line

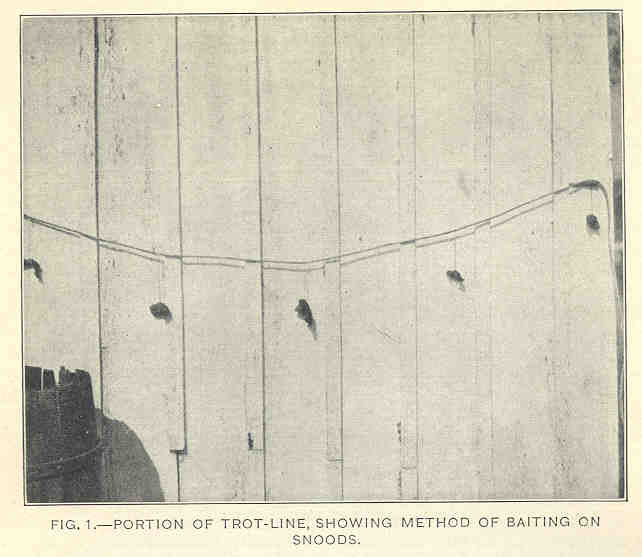
Portion of trotline, showing method of baiting on snoods

A trotline is a heavy fishing line with shorter, baited branch lines commonly referred to as snoods suspending down at intervals using clips or swivels, with a hook at the free end of each snood.

Trotlines are used in commercial angling and can be set up across a channel, river, or stream to cover an entire span of water. There are many ways to set a trotline, with most methods involving weights at the end of snoods to keep them neatly below the water surface. They are used for catching crabs or fish (particularly catfish). Trotlines should be used with caution as they are deemed illegal in many locations.

Trotlines are similar to a longline, but longlines are fixed to a surface vessel at only one end and usually towed along the water, while trotlines are fixed (usually stationarily) to the surface at both ends via anchored boats, buoys or structures. It is also contrasted with droplines, as a trotline's mainline is laid horizontally across water with a series of vertically suspended snood lines, while a dropline's mainline is suspended vertically (using a weight) from a floating buoy with a series of side-branching snoods.

== Variations ==
In its use in the commercial crabbing industry (on the Chesapeake Bay for example), a trotline is used as a variation of a setline. Webster's dictionary defines a setline as being "a long heavy fishing line to which several hooks are attached in series." A trotline is defined as "a comparatively short setline used near shore or along streams." Some other common variations of a setline include limblines, throwlines, and juglines. The Virginia Department of Game & Fisheries defines a trotline as "a line without a rod or reel attached that need not be held in the hand or closely attended."

As used for crabbing, a trotline is nothing more than a long line, resting on the bottom and anchored at both ends, to which a series of baits are attached at intervals of two to six feet. The baits are attached to the main line by simple slipknots or by shorter lines called dropper lines (known as trots or snoods.) Crab trotlines are usually baited with chicken necks, chicken livers, bull lips, eels or other inexpensive baits. Maryland blue crabs are harvested by waterman on small workboats using trotlines and crab pots. When caught by trotlines, the line is set and the workboat moves slowly end to end, bringing the line to the surface where the waterman catches the crab. Crabs on a trotline are not hooked, they are simply netted by the waterman at the surface, with the workboat moving slowly enough through the water that the crab does not discern movement as it eats the bait. The crab having been netted at the surface, the trotline moves back to or toward the bottom with the same bait intact to attract another crab.

Depending on the length of the trotline (usually from at least 100 yards and up to a mile), a commercial waterman can catch anywhere from 4 bushels to 20 bushels of crabs daily.

== Construction ==
Constructing a trotline is quite simple. Basic supplies needed are fishing hooks, clamps, swivels, fishing line, and a durable cord or lightweight rope used for the main line. Before constructing the trotline, it is a good idea to measure the span of the body of water being fished in order to give the main line an appropriate length. Once this is done, drop lines are set along the main line by threading clamps on the line with swivels between them. Fishing line is attached to the swivels and hooks are tied to the end of the fishing line.

Typically, the drop lines are set so that the hook of one line can not touch the hook of another line, to prevent the fish from getting tangled up in multiple lines, or getting tangled in lines with other fish already on the line. This might mean using lines just over 1 foot long and having the lines spaced in 3 foot intervals. It is also typical to avoid setting lines directly over stumps, branches or other obstacles that might cause the fish to get tangled. This is done so that any released fish has a better chance of being in good health.

Weighting the line is a matter of personal preference. In areas along rivers and channels with strong currents, large weights may be added to keep the line from being pulled close to the surface as the water passes over the line. Most weights used on trotlines are homemade as typical weights used by anglers do not weigh enough to keep the line in place. These may be made out of cement, cinder blocks, or even small boat anchors. Other common weights used include old fashioned window weights, chisel plowshares and other similar sized scrap metal.

== Setting the line ==
It is important to make sure that the area where the line is to be set is free of swimmers, boaters, or other people on or near the water as it is difficult to detect where a trotline is while it is underwater. It is easy to get tangled in the line and for hooks to become embedded in a person's skin, making the need for proper marking of the line crucial. A float on each side of a section of channel is a good indication that a trotline has been set.

Setting the line consists of anchoring one end to one side of the channel, then taking the line out to the other side, baiting the hooks while this is being done. Trees or rocks make good anchor points for trotlines, but attention should be given that the line is not tied around rough or sharp edges that might cut through the line.

Once the line is set, the angler need only check the line periodically throughout the day to see if any fish have been caught. While checking the line, one can also replace bait, untangle drop lines, and retrieve any fish on the line. Care is needed when checking or setting the line to make sure that no one is accidentally hooked in any part of the process.

Be sure to check local and state regulations as trotlines are not legal for use in all areas. Additionally, many localities that allow trotlines do not allow the use of live bait fish, particularly in areas with populations of largemouth bass or similar predator fish, as they can be severely injured or killed when attempting to escape. This is why cut bait is the most commonly used bait for attracting catfish.

== See also ==
- Long-line fishing
