= Bite indicator =

Signalling device used in angling

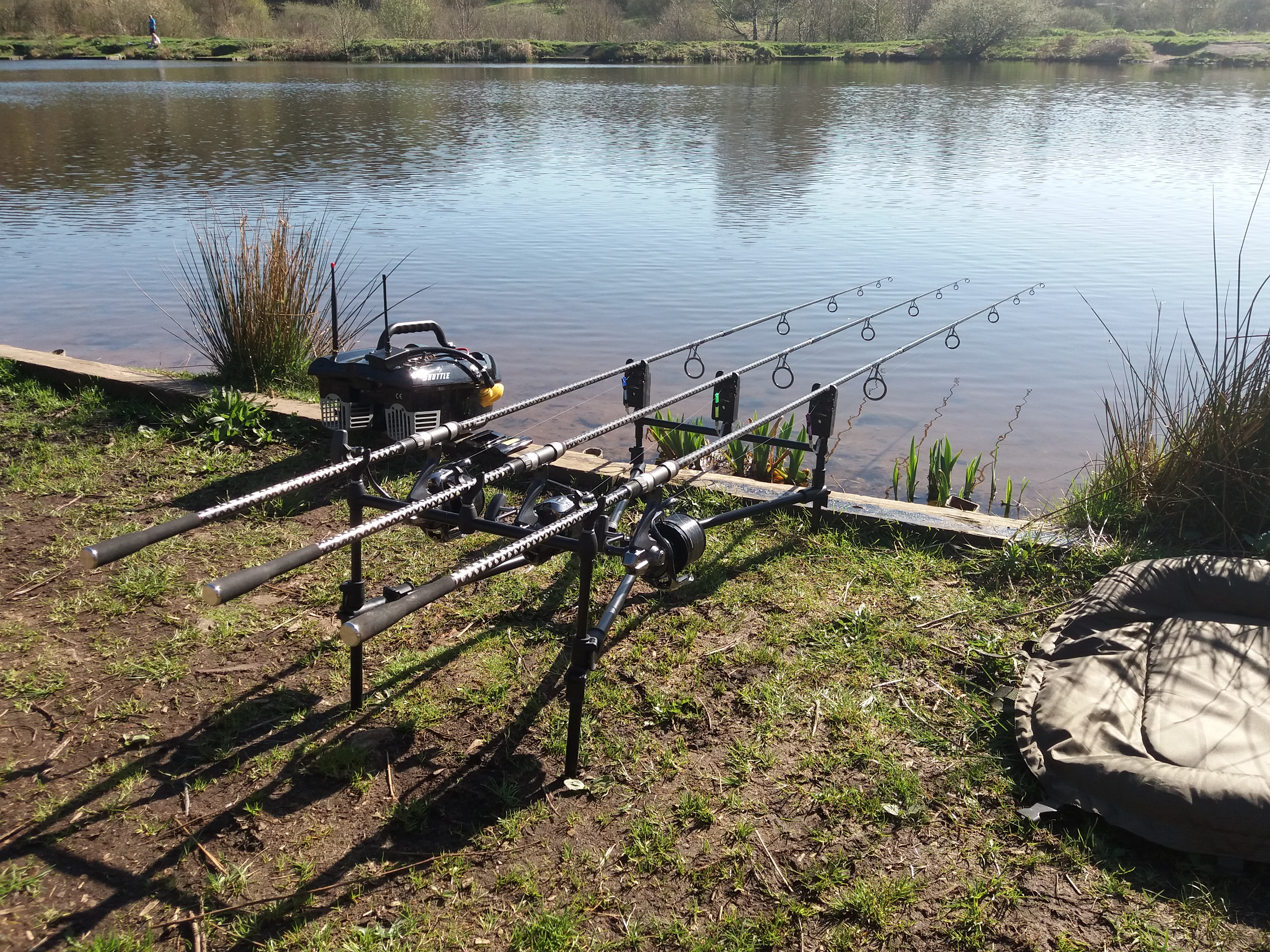
Electronic bite alarms as used by carp anglers

A bite indicator is any signalling device (mechanical or electronic) used in angling which alerts the fisherman of what is happening at the hook end of the fishing line, particularly whether a fish has swallowed (i.e. "bite") the hook. It is the quintessential tackle used in bait fishing, which depends partly on luck and often requires unpredictable periods of time passively waiting for fish to bite the hook.

== Types ==
There are many types of bite indicators. Which ones work best depends on the type of fishing.

- Fishing floats: lightweight buoys widely used as bite indicators. Floats oscillate in and out of the water surface when the hook suspended below is pulled by fish biting the hookbait. They are usually "cocked" by different split shot weights so that just the brightly coloured tip of the float is showing above the surface.

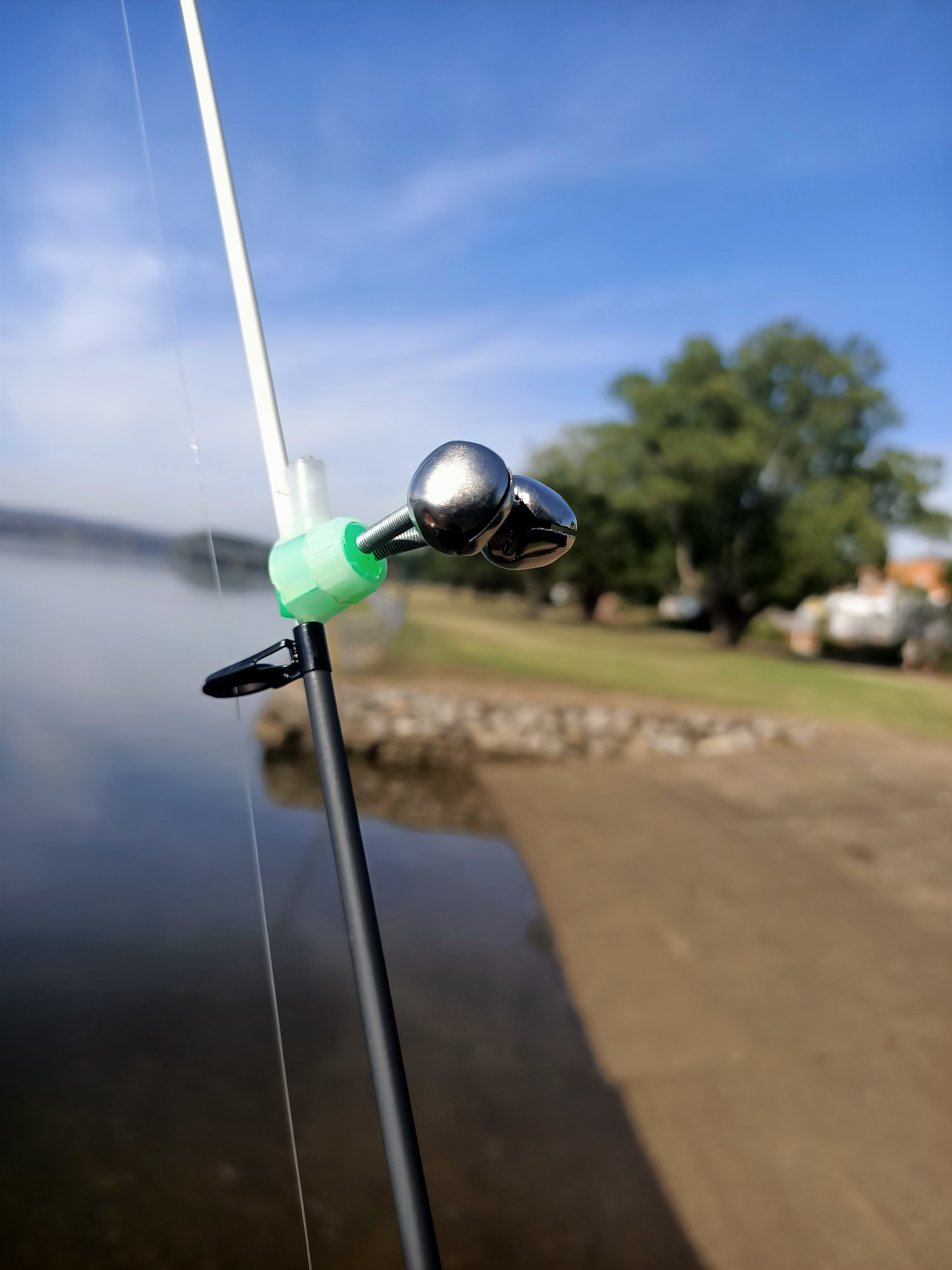
Fishing bells that uses a screw clamp

- Fishing bells: a bulldog clip attached to a pair of small jingle bells. When clipped onto the fishing rod, the bell clip is placed in contact with the fishing line and any vibrations transmitted from the line will cause the bell to rattle, giving off alerting sounds that the angler can hear. Other designs use a screw-tightened clamp instead of a clip, which allows it to be more securely attached to the rod.
- Quiver tips: attached onto the end of the fishing rod. These can be screw in or push in and come in different weights of test curve for sensitivity and application, such as river and stillwater use. It amplifies vibrations transmitted from the line onto the rod, and is typically used in bottom fishing.
- Swing Tip: similar to quiver tips but hang off the tip of the rod and pull up into a horizontal position during a bite. These are usually screw in and are not as common as quiver tips.
- Bite alarms: electronic buzzers which bleep when the line is tugged. The fishing line is wound on a running roller, which is monitored by a sensor that makes a noise when the fishing line moves, thus alerting the angler that a fish might be hooked. They are attached to the fishing rod between the reel and the first eye on the rod, and give an audible alert when there is a simple movement of the line.

Bite alarms can range from simple devices with an on/off switch that do no more than indicate when the line moves over the roller, to more sophisticated devices with volume, tone and sensitivity controls. They are useful when fishing with more than one rod, and are commonly used when coarse fishing for carp. Whereas floats can be used as visual bite detectors, bite alarms are audible bite detectors. Although more expensive than visual devices, audible devices are popular as they do not require constant monitoring. They were invented by Richard Walker.

== See also ==
- Short video: fishing bells reacting to bites
