= Jiggerpole =

Long fishing pole

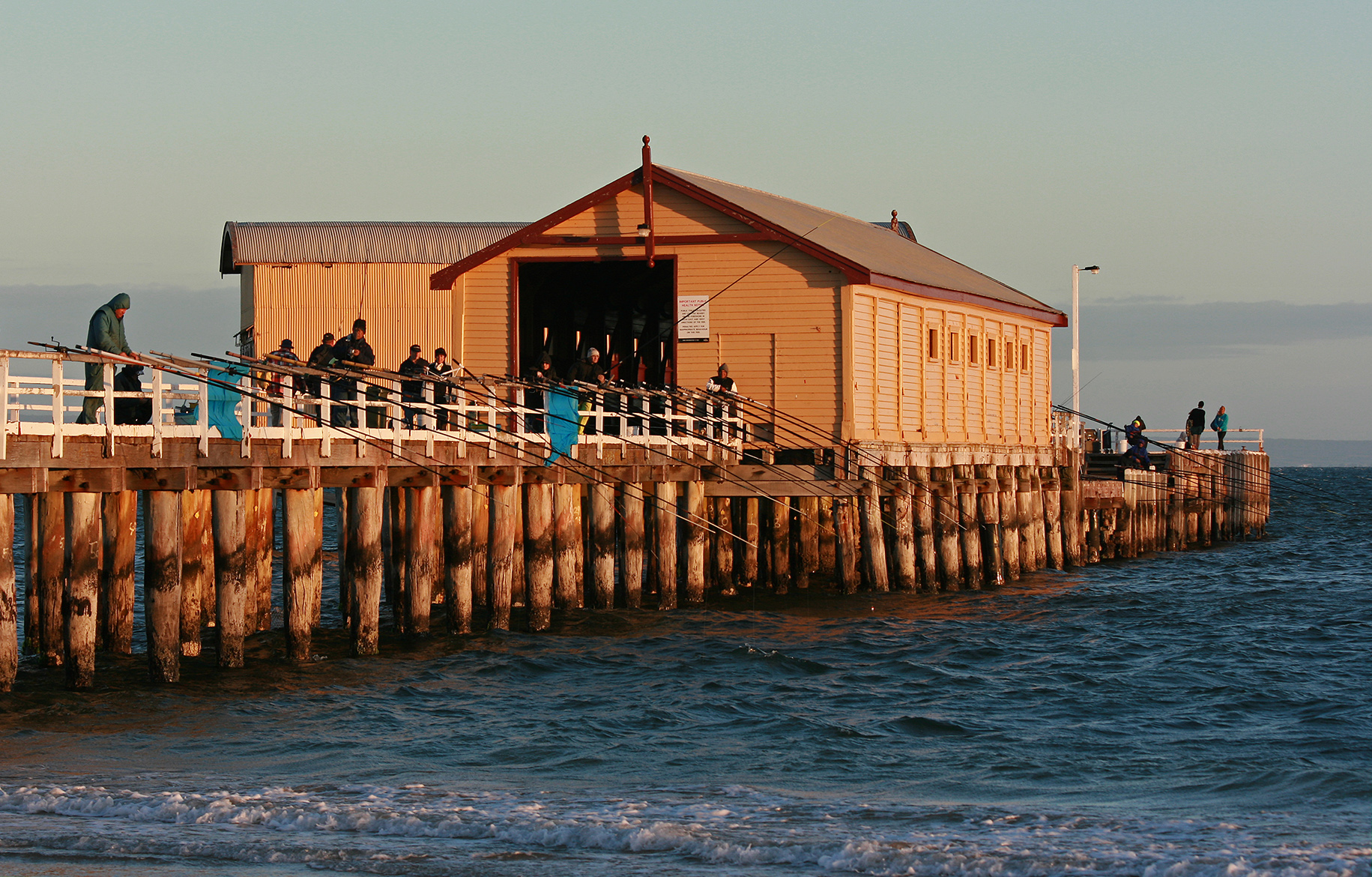
Fishermen using jiggerpoles in Queenscliff, Victoria, Australia

A jiggerpole (or jigger pole) is a long fishing pole that is used with a short and heavy line, usually a foot (0.3 m) or less of 50 lbf (220 N) test or heavier. Then a large lure or bait is attached and manually worked around the shoreline and cover. In deep cover, the lure or bait can be presented by placing the tip of the fishing pole into the water. A jiggerpole may refer to a spar that extends a mast.

== History ==
Fishing with a jiggerpole is perhaps the oldest known method of capturing bass with an artificial lure. "Generations ago, savvy swamp fishermen used long cane poles rigged with short lengths of heavy line and large spinner/lures."
