= Fishing gaff =

Hooked pole for pulling fish out of water

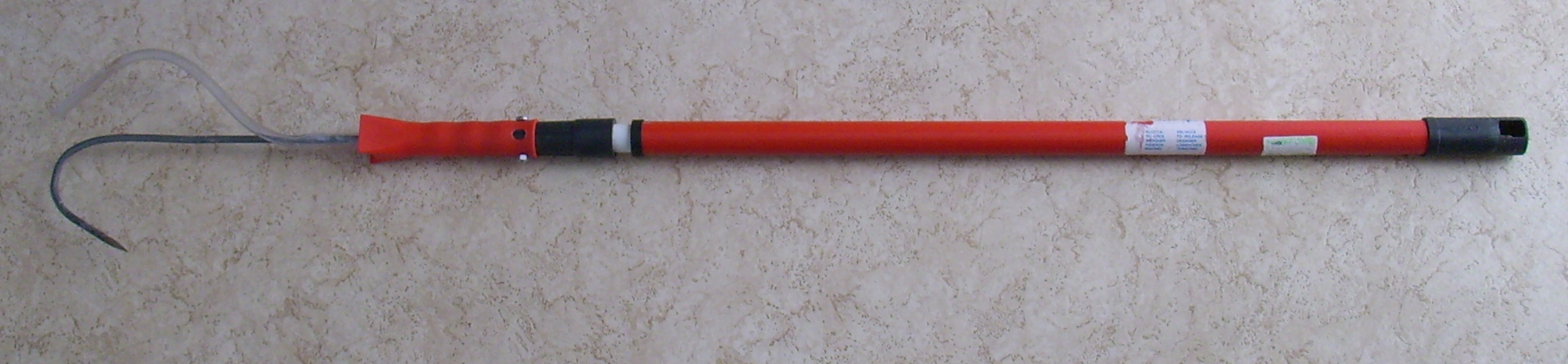
A standard-sized gaff used in angling

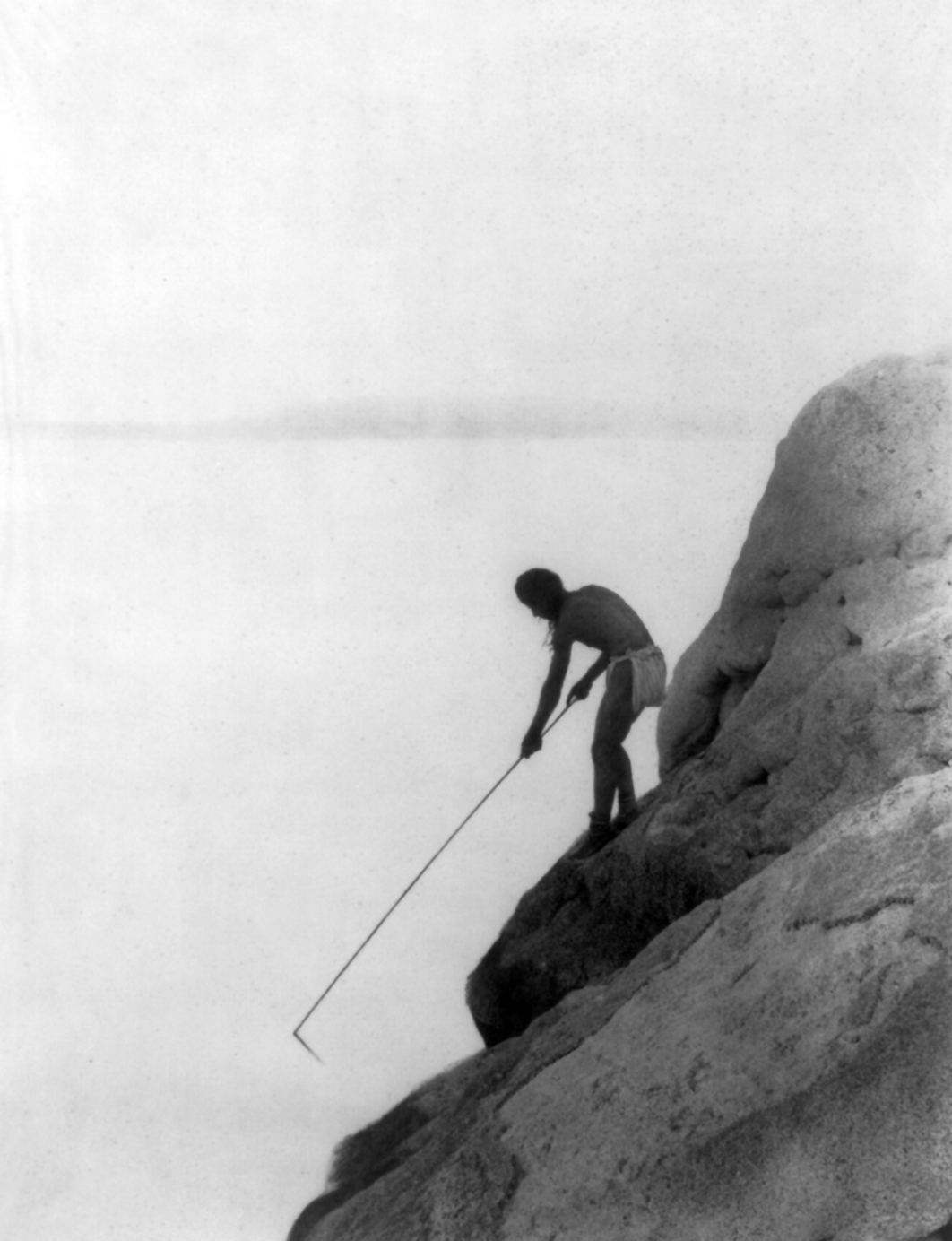
Fishing with a long pole gaff

In fishing, a gaff is a handheld pole with a sharp hook or sideway spike on the distal end, which is used to pull large fish from the water. Fishing activities that are solely done with gaffs are known as gaffing.

Gaffs are used when the size and weight of the target fish exceeds the breaking strength of the fishing line or the fishing rod, and thus typical angling retrieval would be problematic. Like spearfishing, gaffs cannot be used if it is intended to release the fish unharmed after capture, unless the fish is skillfully gaffed right in a non-vital part such as the lip, jaw or lower gill using a thin hook (though very difficult to perform and thus unlikely).

A flying gaff is a specialized type of gaff used for securing and controlling very large, feisty fish. The hook part of the gaff (the head) detaches when excessive force is used, somewhat like a harpoon's dart. The head is secured to the boat with a length of heavy rope or cable, allowing the fish to remain tethered and get fatigued out before eventually retrieved.

== See also ==
- Spearfishing
- Snagging
