= Payao (fishing) =

Fish aggregating device of Southeastern Asia

A payao is a traditional fish aggregating device from the Philippines. Payaos are traditionally floating rafts of bamboo anchored to the seafloor, with submerged weighted palm fronds beneath it. They were harvested using handline fishing, surface trolling, or small-scale purse seining. Modern steel payaos use fish lights and fish location sonar to increase yields. While payao fishing is sustainable on a small scale, the large scale, modern applications have been linked to adverse impacts on fish stocks. Payaos have been introduced to fishermen in Vietnam, Thailand (where it is known as sung), and various countries in Oceania (including the Federated States of Micronesia, Fiji, Papua New Guinea, and the Solomon Islands).

Similar devices are also used traditionally in Indonesia, Malaysia, and Timor-Leste (where they are known as rumpon or roempon in Malay), and among the Moken people of Myanmar.

== Traditional payaos ==
A traditional payao is a bamboo raft anchored to the seafloor with rocks. They are usually placed in very deep water, but coastal and shallow-water versions also exist. The rafts are around 4 m (13 ft) long, 1.5 m (4.9 ft) wide, and tapering at one end. Beneath the raft are palm fronds (usually coconut or nipa palm) suspended with weights, usually to a depth of 30 m (98 ft). They are harvested using handline fishing, surface trolling, or small-scale purse seining. They are used to catch pelagic fish (like tuna, mackerel scad, and kawakawa). Large tuna can be caught in this manner at depths of under 300 meters, far shallower than by contemporary methods like purse seining.

Payao have several different variants, ranging from simple to complex constructions. The bonbon utilizes a horizontal cylindrical bundle of bamboo as the float with palm fronds trailing beneath. The arong utilizes a vertically-oriented bundle of bamboo with branches imitating roots below-water, and leaves arranged above the surface, mimicking a palm tree. The rafts can also be single-layered (where the palm fronds are only present on the underside), or double-layered (where standing poles with palm fronds are placed on the surface).

Before World War II anchored and drifting payaos were deployed in all Philippines regional waters barring the east, where strong currents prohibited it. Payaos are frequently anchored in the coastal waters, passively fishing for migrating fish.

The chronic overfishing of regional Philippine waters, combined with the low impact of shallow-water payao fishing, has led to the establishment of the Tuna Productivity Project in Davao Gulf. This will encourage traditional and environmentally sound fishing, and aims to decrease the catch of juvenile fish.

== Modern payao ==
Modern payao have cylindrical, bullet-shaped, or rectangular steel floats that can better withstand rough seas, with cement anchors sunk to depths of up to 5,000 m (16,000 ft) deep. They have been adapted to meet the demand for commercially sized catches. They are now commonly used in conjunction with purse seiners, pump boats, and gillnet fishing. The success of these methods has greatly increased the pressure on fish stocks. The use of lighted payaos to attract fish has also had a large impact on catch size and profitability, and by the 1980s over 2,000 commercial payaos were being used in the Moro Gulf alone. By this time most other South Pacific nations had payao programs and were seeking to improve their designs for increased durability for use in open ocean environments. In particular, the drifting payaos using seines, as well as the lighted anchored payaos, catch juvenile tuna and byproduct fish, thereby affecting the lifecycle of the tuna beyond the simple loss of numbers from the catch.

No international policy has been set on the placement of payaos, and many are currently deployed in sea lanes, presenting a navigational hazard. The replacement of bamboo with steel cages has also increased potential danger from collision and entanglement.

== See also ==
- Basnig
- Fish corral
- Lampuki netting
- Artificial reef
- United Nations Convention on the Law of the Sea
- Aquaculture
