= Flosser =

Flossers are anglers who use the method of bottom bouncing or lining to catch fish, mainly the salmonid species. The technique is commonly practiced in British Columbia during the summer months, when sockeye and chinook salmon run upstream the Fraser River to spawn.

Flossing uses long leader lines 5 to 20 feet (1.5 to 6.1 m) in length with a 1 to 4 oz (28 to 113 g) lead weight called a "Bouncing Betty" (named after a lethal landmine first used during World War II). To work this method, fishermen often tie on long strands of green or orange yarn and/or Corkies to their hooks. The technique of bottom bouncing is to position the leader so that it "flosses" itself closely against the fish's mouth, and the hook attached at the end of the leader then usually pierces the fish's mouth from the outside in as the weight pulls the line downstream, causing the fish to be snagged.

Due to angling regulations in Western Canada, Chile, Peru and Argentina, hooks devoid of any dressing (whether artificial or organic) are illegal. It is a controversial method, regarded by some as an unsportsmanlike way of harvesting fish.

== See also ==
- Snagging
