= Bagan (fishing) =

Light fishing instrument from Indonesia

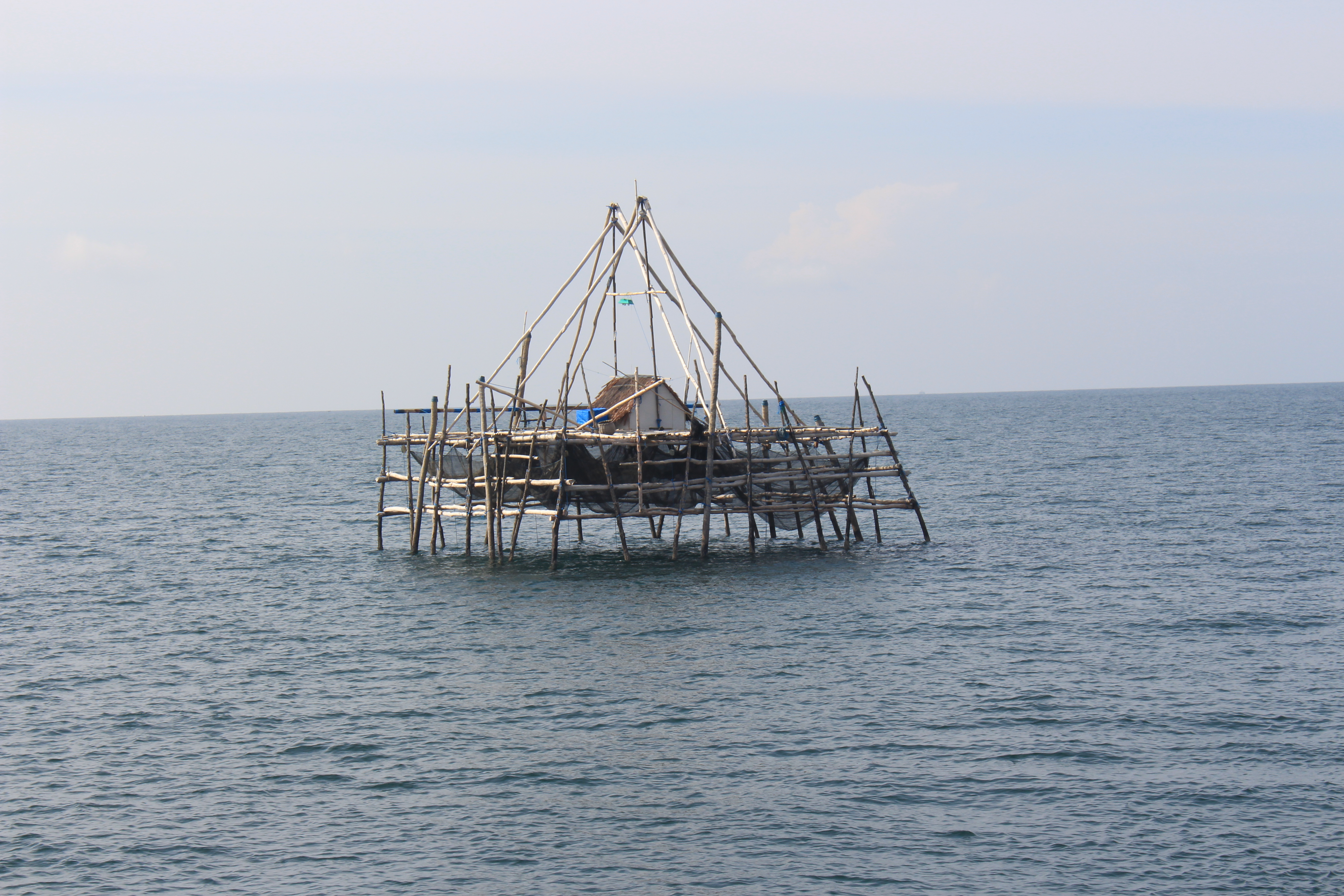
Stationary bagan off Sebamban beach.

Bagan or bagang is a fishing instrument (lift net) that uses nets and lights so that it can be used for light fishing, originating from Indonesia. Bagan is floated out to the sea to catch fishes, squids, and shrimps, and remain in the sea for several days or even months. The catch would be transported to land using other boats.

== History ==
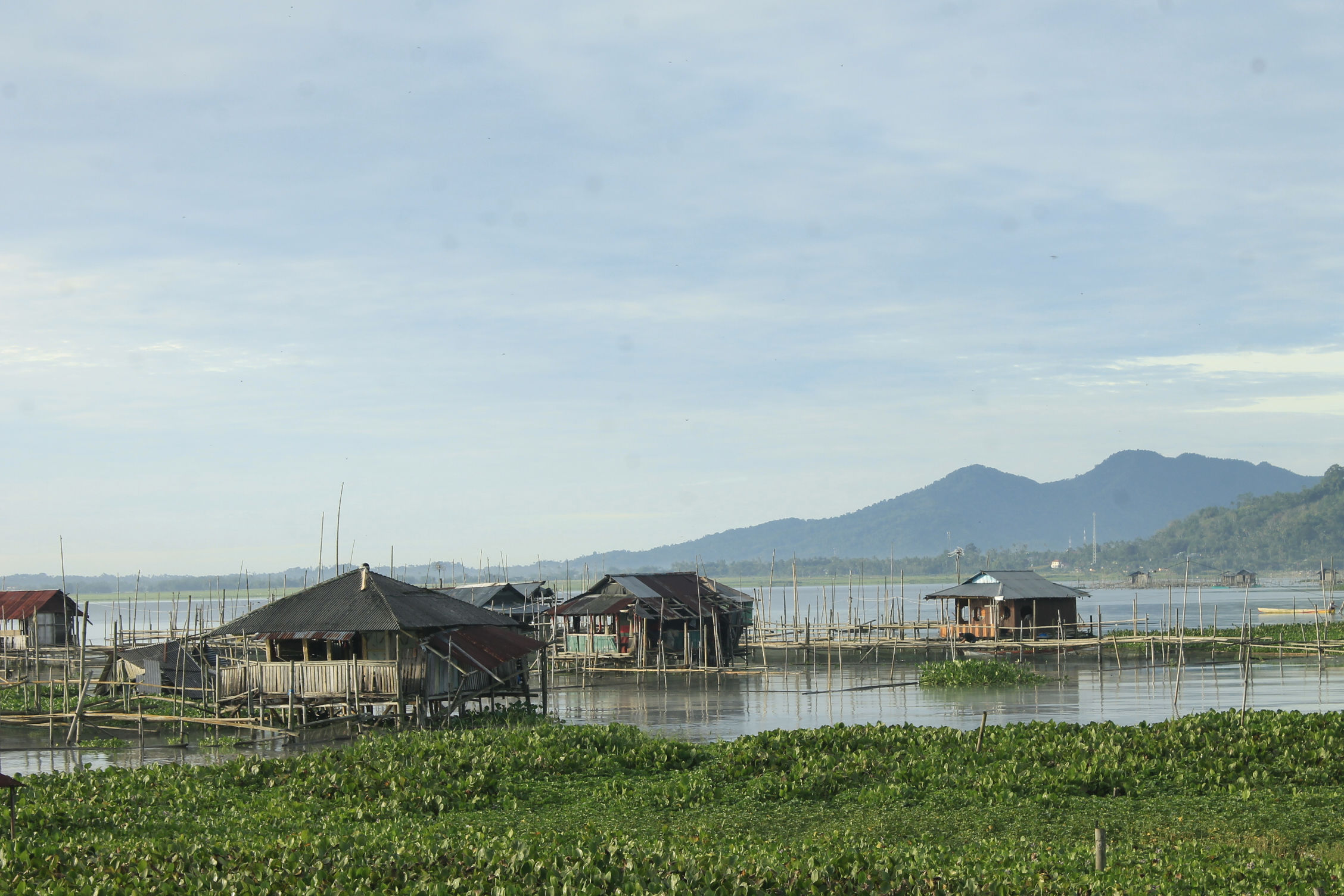
Bagan in Tondao lake.

Earlier light fishing in the archipelago may have appeared with the emergence of acetylene lamps in the early years of the 20th century.

Bagan (bagang) was first introduced by Makassarese and Bugis people in South and Southeast Sulawesi in the 1950s. This version may have used high pressure paraffin steam lamp produced in Indonesia during that time. Then in a relatively short period of time it has been known almost throughout the Indonesian fishing area and in its development has undergone changes in shape.

== Description ==
Bagan is made up of several components: Nets, shack (made of woven or wooden material, sometimes without roof), serok (handle net) and lights. The nets are generally 9 x 9 m wide, with 0.5 – 1 cm mesh, made of cotton or nylon yarn. These nets are fastened to a rectangular frame made of bamboo or wood. The shack (anjang-anjang) is made of bamboo/wood whose underside is 10 x 10 m, while the upper part is 9.5 x 9.5 m (for stationary bagan). At the deck there is a roller to lower and lift the net. Catching with a bagan is only done at night (light fishing), especially on the dark moon phase by using lights as fishing aids.

== Types ==
An illustration of bagan tancap (stationary lift net) and bagan rakit (raft lift nets).

=== Bagan tancap (stationary lift net) ===
This bagan is non-movable and once installed (planted) means it is operated for the duration of the fishing season. The net would be lowered using the roller. On the dark phases of the moon, lights are turned on since sunset and placed at a distance of ± 1 m above the water surface. When a large number of fish have gathered, the net is lifted and the process is repeated until it gets the desired results. The catch is generally the types of small fish such as: tembang (sardinella), anchovies, japuh (rainbow sardine), selar (yellowstripe scad), petek (leiognathidae), kerong-kerong (crescent grunter), kapas-kapas (gerres filamentosus), squid, cuttlefish, etc.

=== Bagan rakit (raft lift nets) ===
A raft bagan is a lifting net that can be moved in locations where fish are predicted to be mobile. Like the stationary bagan, there is also a platform above the raft. On either side below the shack is placed a raft and bamboo as the base (foundation) of the shack as well as a floating device.

An illustration of bagan perahu (boat lift nets) and bagan perahu beranjang-anjang (boat lift nets with platform).

=== Bagan perahu (boat lift nets) ===
Compared to a raft bagan, the shape of the boat bagan is simpler and lighter making it easier to move to the desired place. This boat bagan consists of two boats which are connected at the front and back by two bamboo sticks so that a square is formed as a place to hang the net.

=== Bagan perahu beranjang-anjang (boat lift nets with platform) ===
It is similar to bagan rakit, but with two boats as the floating device. At the time of fish capture, raft bagan, boat bagan, or boat bagan with platform is anchored.

=== Bagan berlayar (lift nets with sail) ===
While the other types were towed to the sea, sailing bagan has its own rudder and sail and generally is a boat with platform. They are usually a larger version of local boats and canoes, for example those from West Sulawesi has a hull similar to Mandarese sandeq. Some of them has a large hold built with planks, loosely coupled with a stick and string. The others are beautiful with slender boards and beautiful bow and stern like a sapa (sope), while some others doesn't have the sapa's bow. A lot of them has decorated stern, gunwale, and poop deck.

The best sailing bagan has masts on each hull (it it's a catamaran) and two parallel rigging. The rigging on East Indonesian sailing bagan is nade (gunter) or lete (lateen), the ones from Java and Sulawesi has tanja rig. Majority of sailing bagang is steered using large central rudder placed vertically, only few had side (quarter) rudders, but in practice the sail has more effect than the rudders.

== Gallery ==
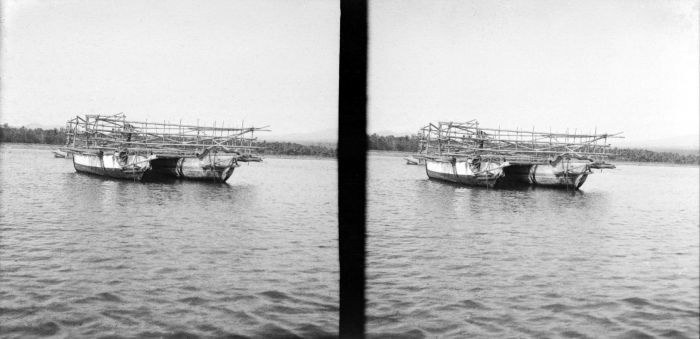
Boat bagan with platform in Singaraja, Bali.

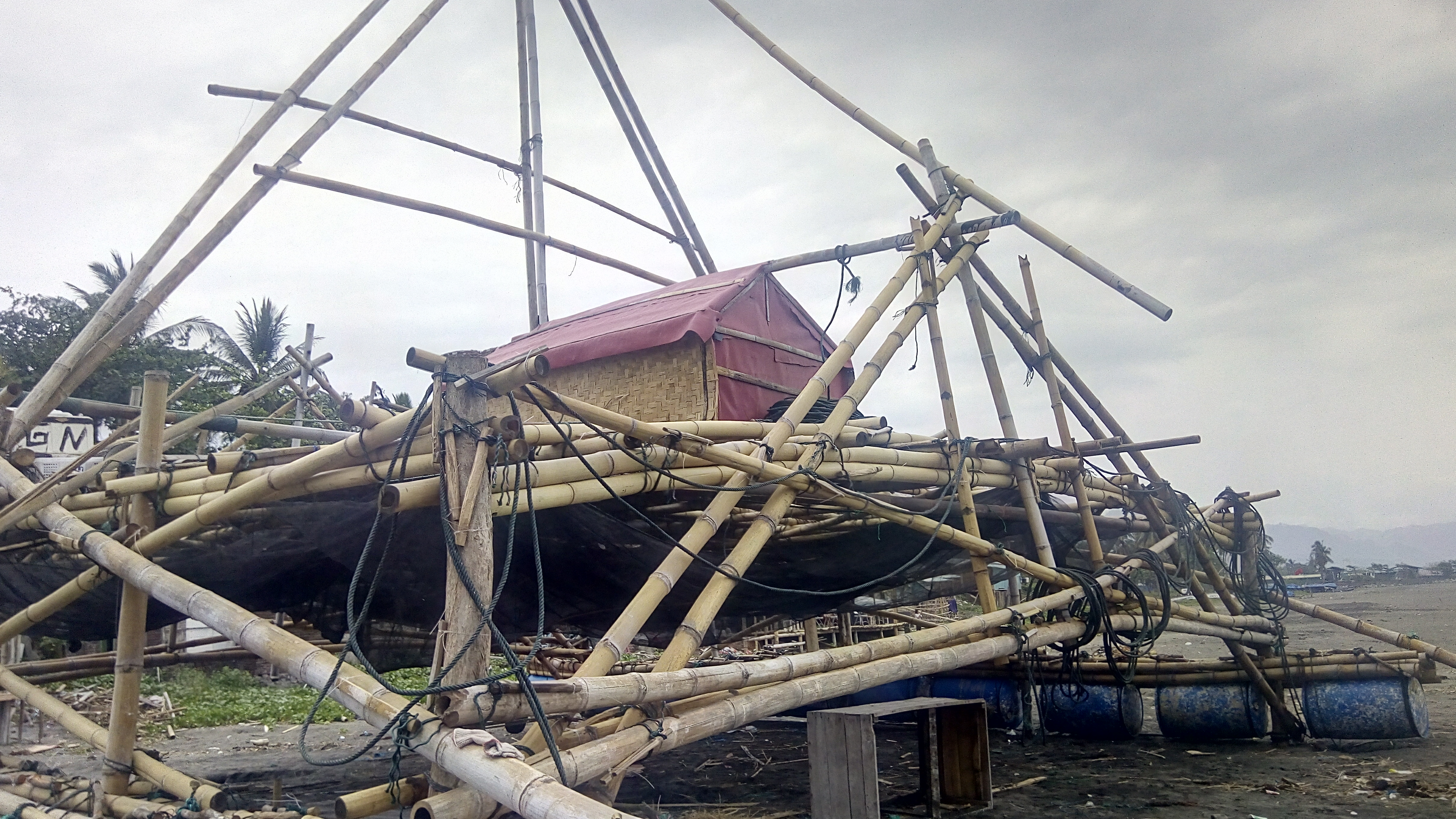
A close up view of a bagan in Palabuhan Ratu, West Java, Indonesia.

== See also ==
- Basnigan, similar fishing instrument from Philippines
- Mayang (boat)
- Jukung
- Sandeq
