= Salambáw =

Traditional Philippine fishing net

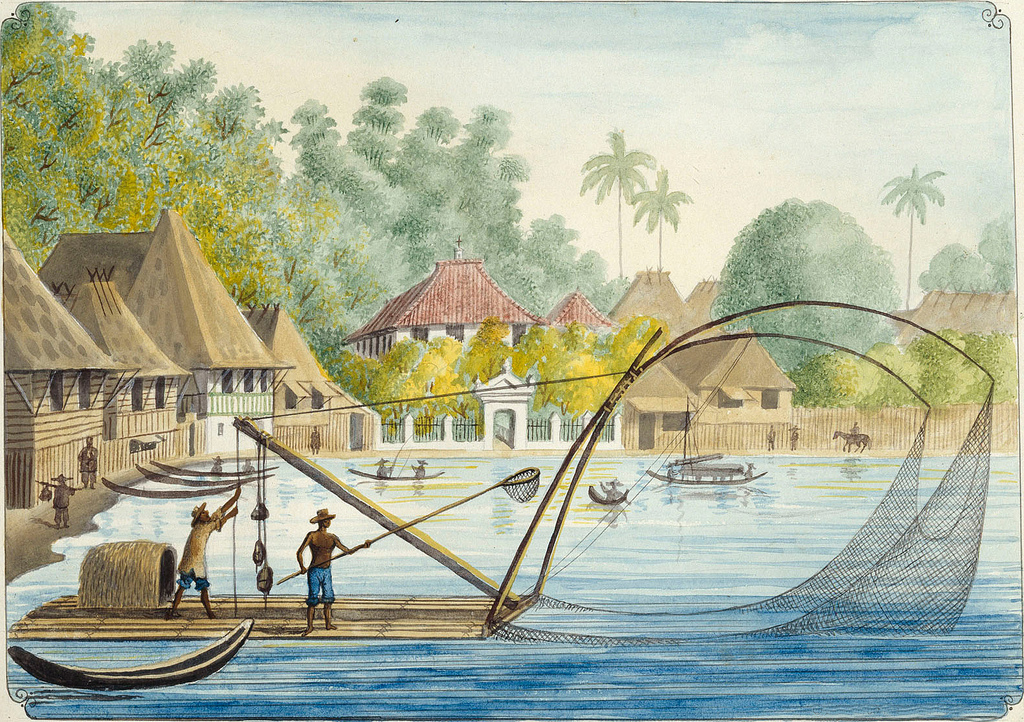
Pesca con el Sarambao (1847), a painting of salambáw fishermen by José Honorato Lozano

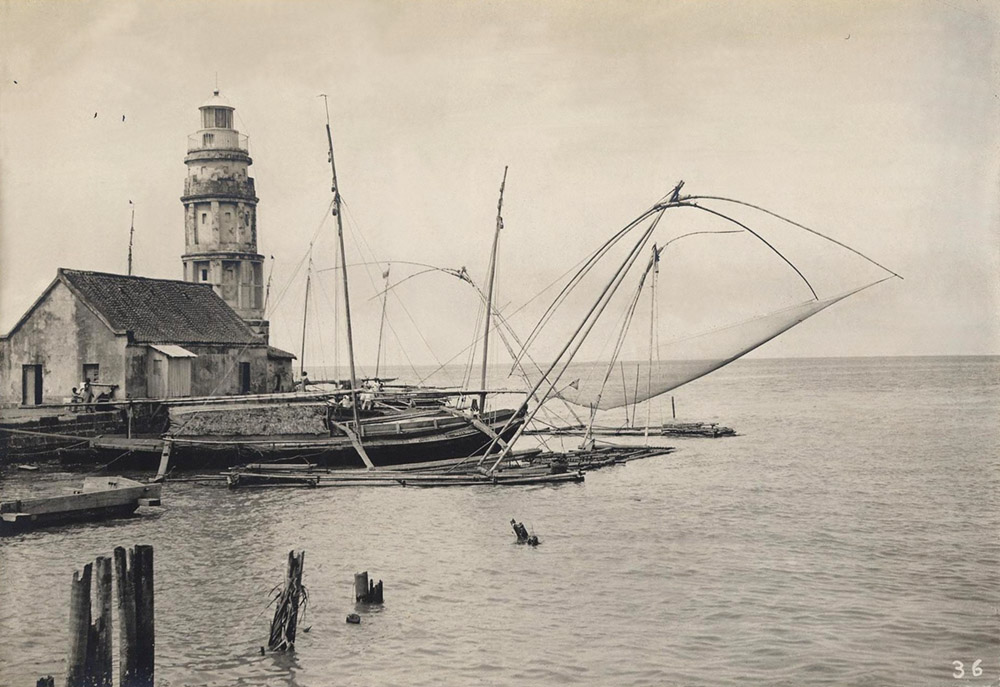
Salambáw lift net rafts beside Pasig River Light, Manila, Philippines (c. 1900-1902)

Salambáw (Spanish: salambáo or sarambáo), is a type of lift net used by indigenous fishermen in the Philippines. They are found throughout the Philippine islands but are most prevalent in large lakes like Laguna de Bay, and sheltered coastal areas like Manila Bay, Ragay Gulf, and Batan Bay. Variations of salambáw lift nets include the bintol (used for catching crabs), panak (used for catching chambered nautilus), tangkal (a stationary lift net operated at night), and the basnig (a deep-water lift net operated from outrigger canoes). Salambáw rafts were also known as saraboa or salakab.

== Etymology ==
Salambáw is derived from Proto-Western Malayo-Polynesian *salambaw, meaning a "large fishing net". Its cognates include səlambaw in Iban and Malay. The term is only used in the northern and Visayan regions in the Philippines and is absent in the south.

== Description ==
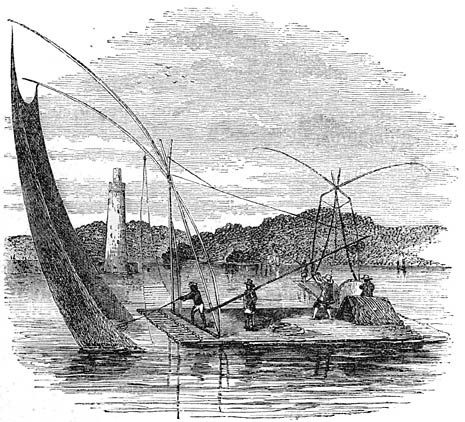
1855 woodcut of a salambáw raft in operation in Manila Bay by the French traveler Paul de la Gironiere

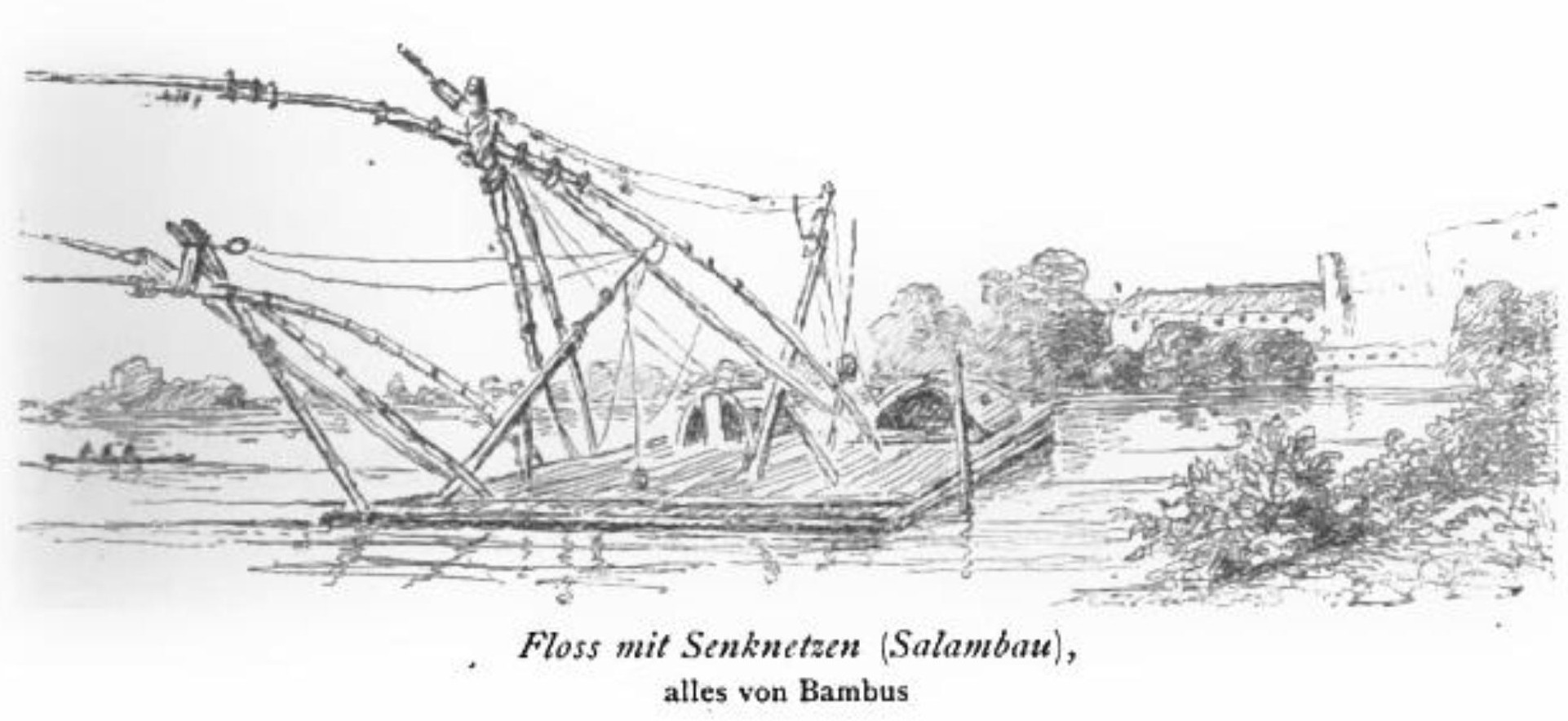
1873 illustration of a salambáw raft by German explorer Fedor Jagor

Salambáw rafts were made from reeds or bamboo lashed together. At the center of the raft is a tall upright pole or a tower structure (timba) around 15 to 20 m (49 to 66 ft) in height. At the top of the pole are two large curving spars crossed with each other. A large square net is attached to the ends of these spars. The pole acts as a crane, it can be tilted to submerge the net using a weighted lever mechanism. The operator either pushes or pulls the lever, or climbs on it to bring it down with their body weight, thus raising the pole.

Salambáw rafts are usually operated by two people. Though it catches only a few fish at a time, they can be raised and lowered repeatedly every few minutes. Salambáw operated at night may use fishing light attractors. These were traditionally candles made of resin.

== Variants ==
=== Basnig ===
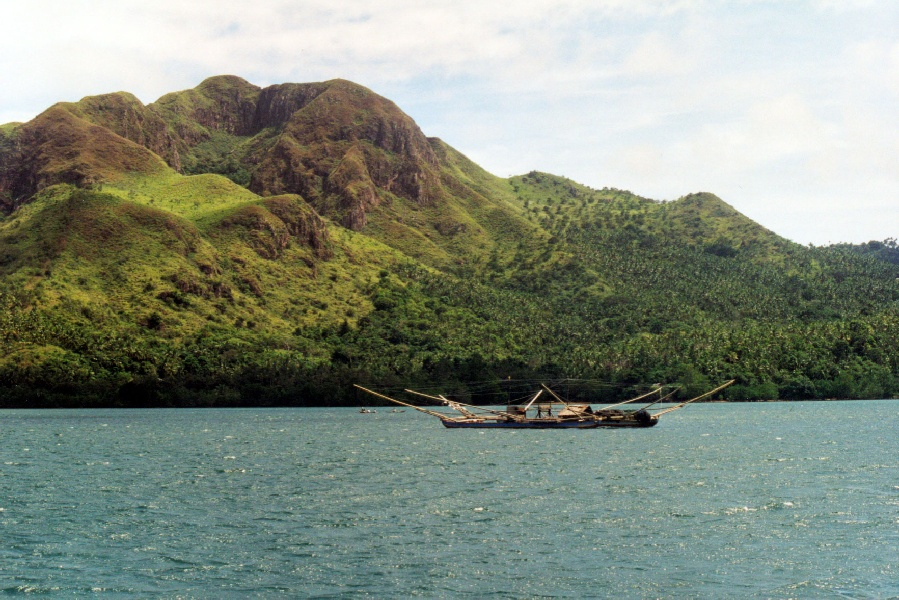
A basnigan near Basilan with nets deployed

Basnig or Balasnig are lift nets operated by a large outrigger boat called Basnigan. They utilize a large bag net suspended directly below or beside the ship. This net is attached to multiple temporary booms projecting from the ship's outriggers and detachable auxiliary masts. Modern basnig typically use generators and electric lights to attract fish and squid. This method is unique to the Philippines. It is common in the Visayas, particularly in the provinces of Capiz and Iloilo. With the poles deployed, the entire ship can look like a spiderweb.

=== Bintol ===
A smaller hand-operated version of the salambáw is known as a bintol. It is shaped like a square and is baited. It is used primarily to catch crabs in shallow water. Bintol are usually lowered to the bottom of inland waters, at depths of 5 to 7 m (16 to 23 ft).

=== Panak ===
Another specialized deep-sea lift net is known as the panak. It is used to catch lagang (chambered nautilus, which are valued for their shells), and sometimes lobsters. Panak can be lowered to extreme depths of 120 to 150 m (390 to 490 ft). In contrast to the shallow-water salambáw, they are only lowered and raised around ten times a night.

=== Tangkal ===
Tangkal or bintahan are large stationary lift nets. They use box-shaped nets and are operated from a bamboo platform built on the shoreline or out at sea. They typically use kerosene lamps placed above the center of the net as fish attractors. The nets are lifted by means of counterweights, with the fish collected by long hand nets. They are typically used to catch anchovies, mullets, slipmouths, and barracudas. It is similar to an Indonesian lift net known as bagan.

== Cultural significance ==
One of the three patron saints of the Catholic Obando Fertility Rites in Obando, Bulacan is Nuestra Señora Inmaculada Concepción de Salambáo, better known as Our Lady of Salambáo. She is named thus because her figurine was supposedly discovered by fishermen in a salambáw net.

== See also ==
- Casco (barge)
- Guilalo
