= Lift net =

Catching fish by lifting submerged nets

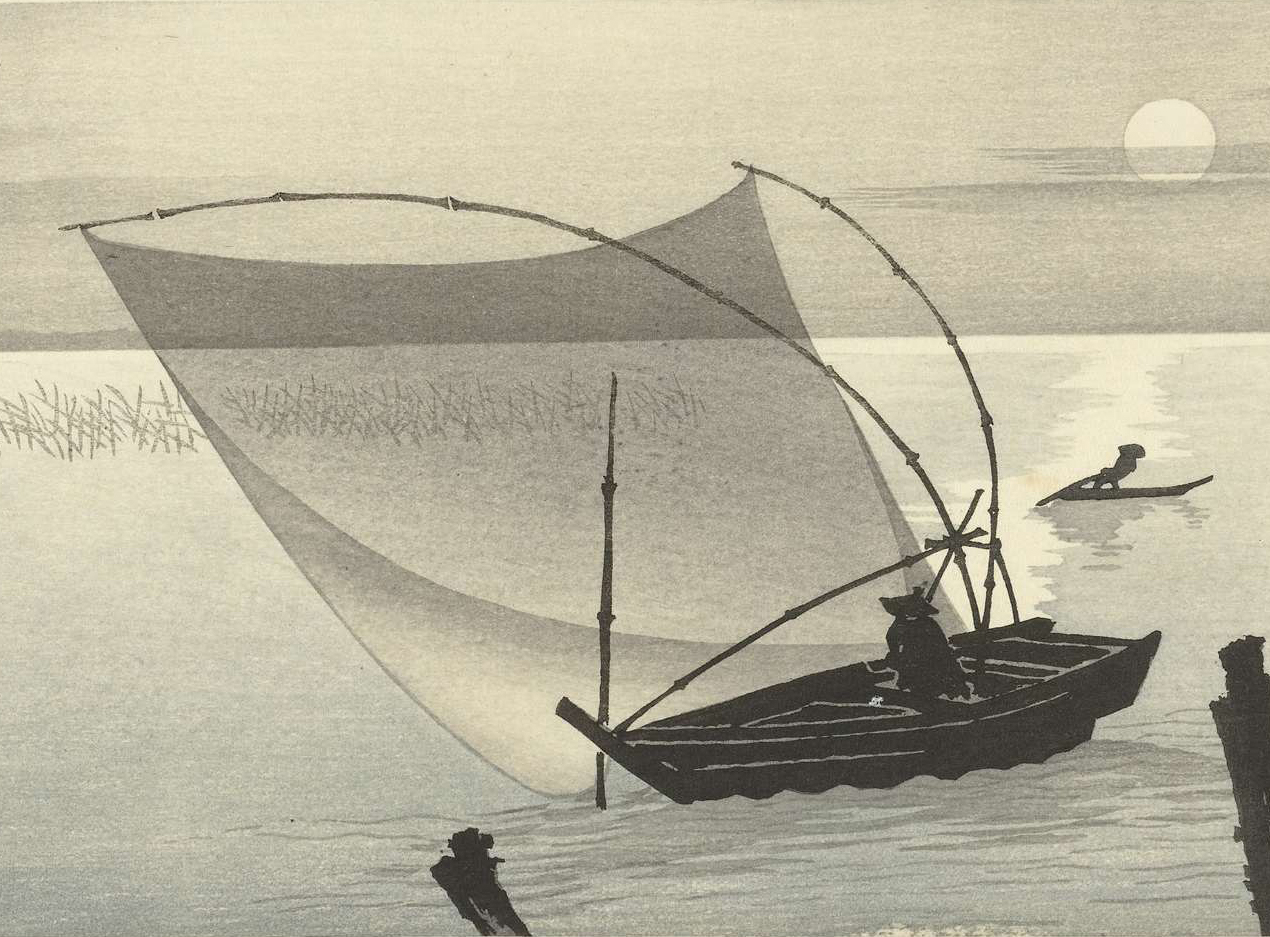
Lift net mounted on a boat, detail from Fishing Boats at Full Moon, a Japanese print by Ohara Koson. 1900–1910.

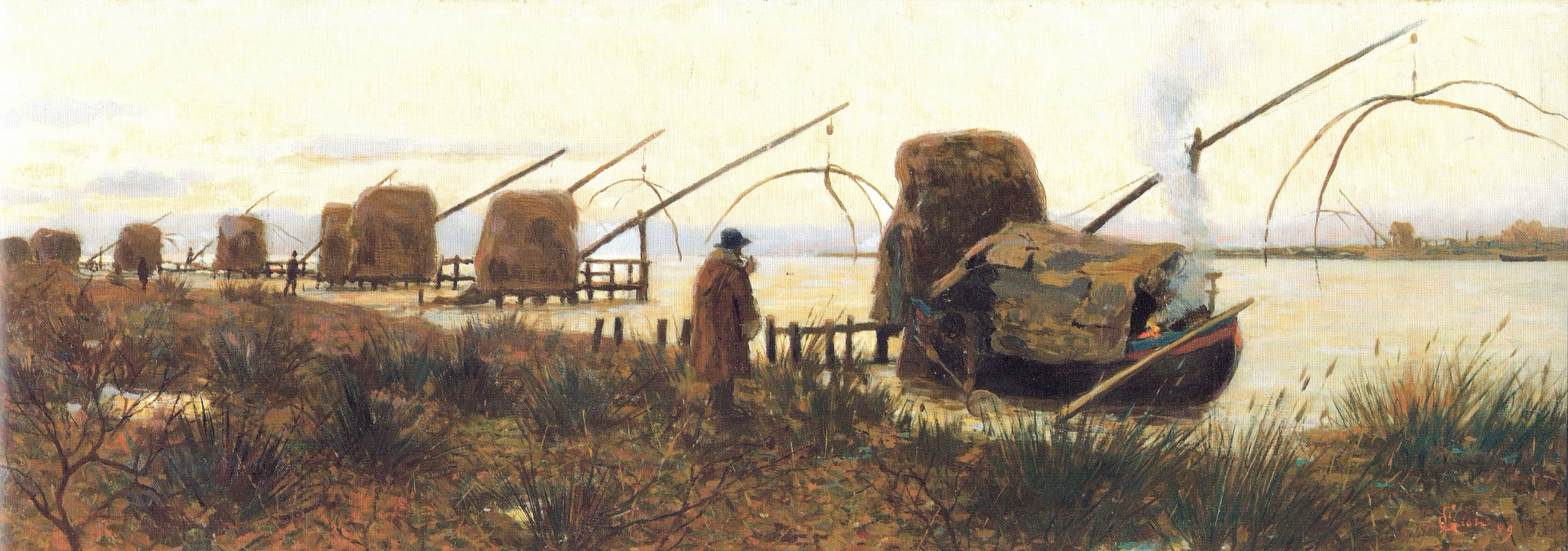
Traditional shore-operated lift nets in Bocca d'Arno, Italy in a painting by Francesco Gioli

Lift nets, also called lever nets, are a method of fishing using nets that are submerged to a certain depth and then lifted out of the water vertically. The nets can be flat or shaped like a bag, a rectangle, a pyramid, or a cone. Lift nets can be hand-operated, boat-operated, or shore-operated. They typically use bait or a light-source as a fish-attractor. Lift nets are also sometimes called "dip nets", though that term applies more accurately to hand nets.

Lift nets are hauled out by hand or mechanically through boom(s) and blocks. The handling (setting and hauling) of large lift nets, normally requires in addition one or several winches. The operations from the shore, from a canoe or a bigger boat includes the setting of the net at a certain depth opening facing upwards- the attraction of the fish over the above mentioned opening by light or bait, then the lifting and hauling of the net out of the water manually or mechanically.

The target species are small pelagic species, fish and squid.

Water Area Overview: All over the world.

These net are active a few meters below the surface. The active gear depends on the attraction power of light when light attraction is used. This differs when lamps are above the surface either one or several, or if under water lamps are used; with the former.

== Types ==
There are 3 main types of lift nets which can be distinguished as; portable hand lift nets (used in general, with light attraction), shore operated stationary lift nets and boat operated lift nets.

=== Portable hand lift nets ===
Portable hand lift nets are small lift nets operated manually (that is, the use of the hand). They usually have a rigid frame which is attached to a long pole. They are used primarily to catch fish and crustaceans, and may be submerged just below the water surface or close to the bottom. A person using hand lift nets usually operate it from the shore, on bridges, and sea coast from harbor walls. The net consists of a horizontal netting panel or a bag shaped (used with the opening facing upwards).

They are dipped into and lifting from the water by means of a long pole if the hand lift nets are larger. No fishing vessel is required. After being submerged and kept a while at a certain depth (within a few meters), with the use of hand, the net is lifted and hauled out of water. The species mainly captured are the pelagic species and this takes place in water areas all over the world.

Portable hand lift nets do not or hardly have any negative environmental impact since the overall expected catch is always very little and when a few very small or juvenile fishes are caught they can be easily released alive.

Portable hand lift nets
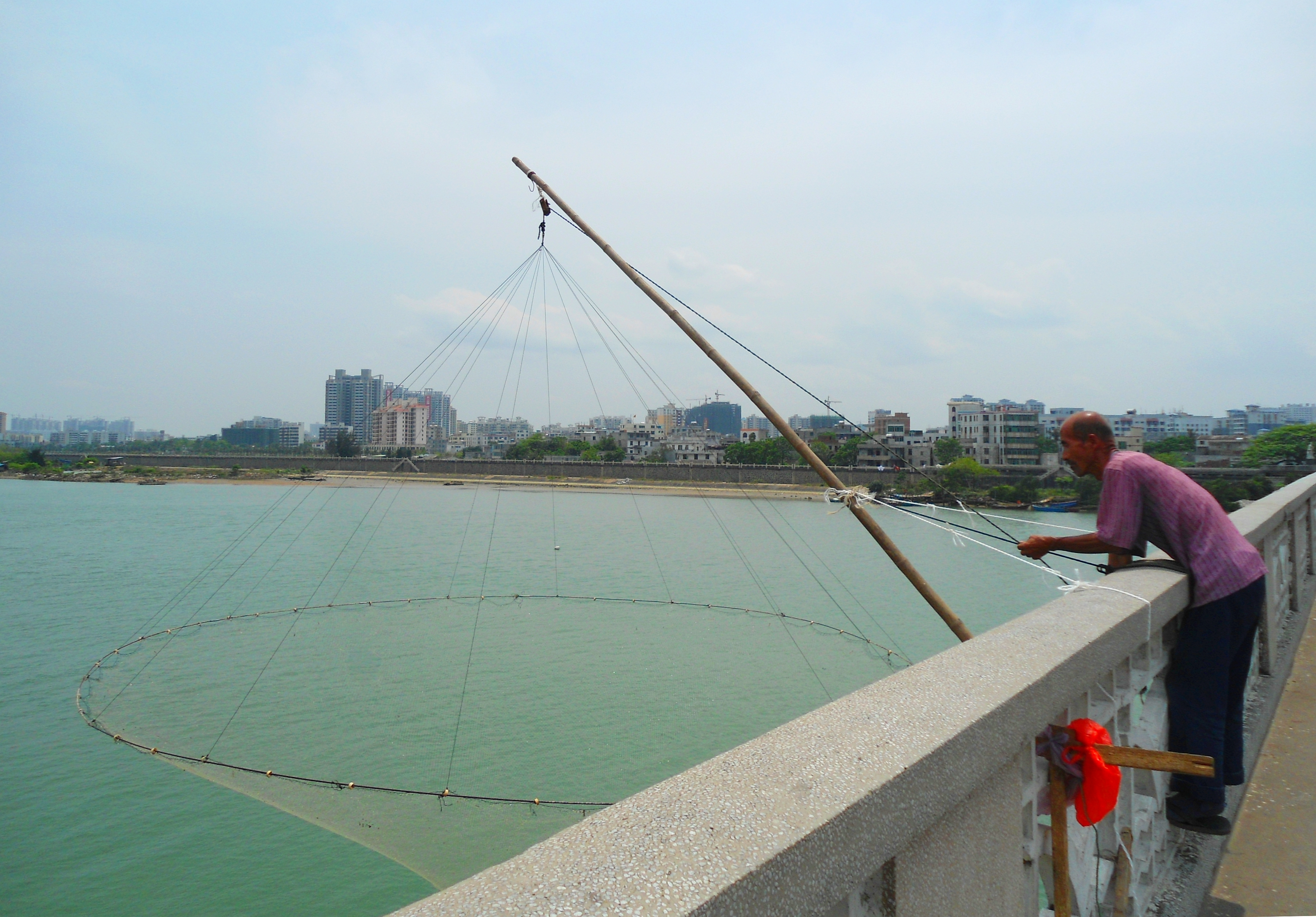
Hand lift net operated by a man on a bridge over Nandu River, Hainan, China

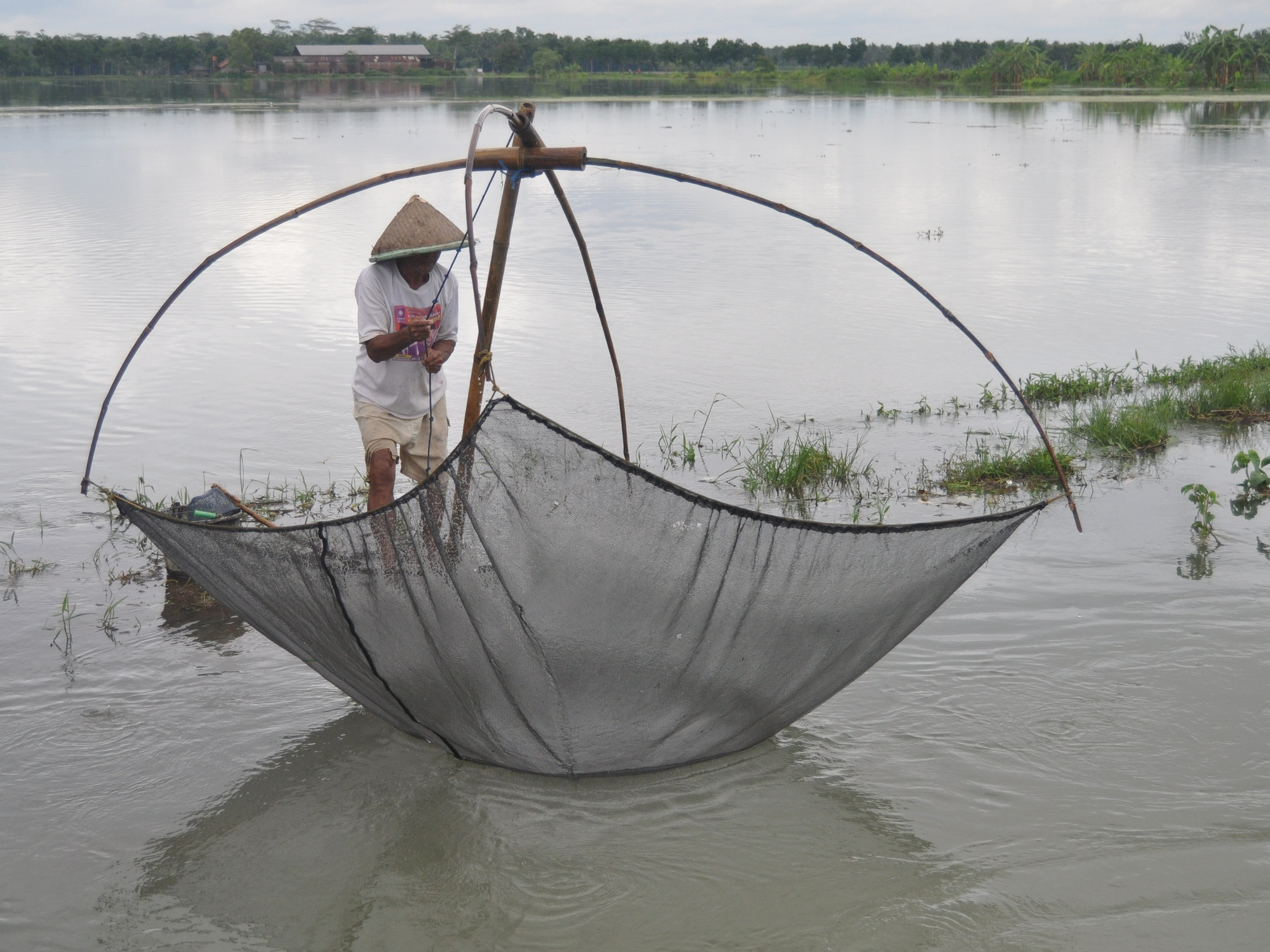
Portable hand lift net, operated in flooded irrigation ditches in Kebumen, Central Java, Indonesia

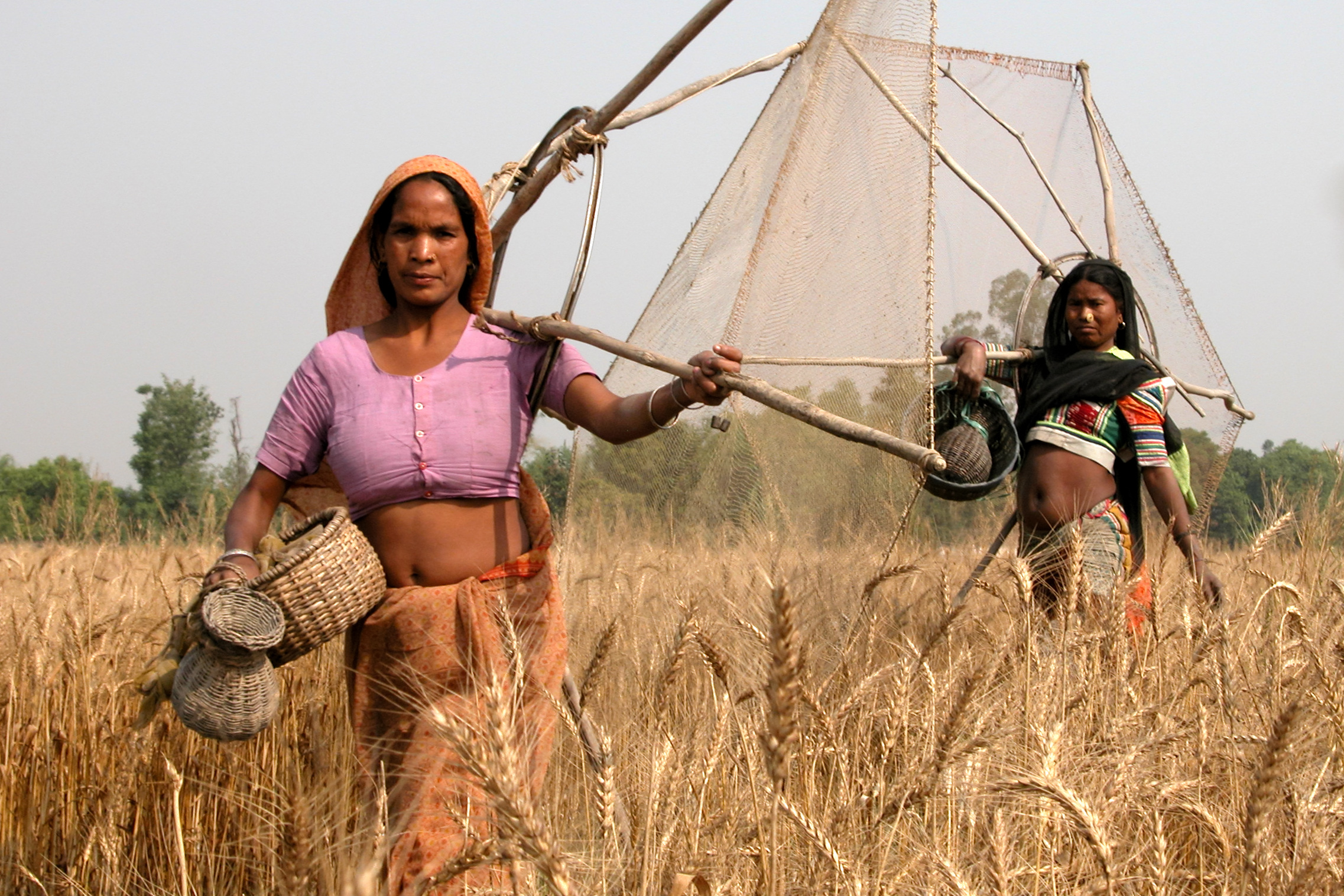
Tharu women in southwest Nepal with hexagonal hand lift nets

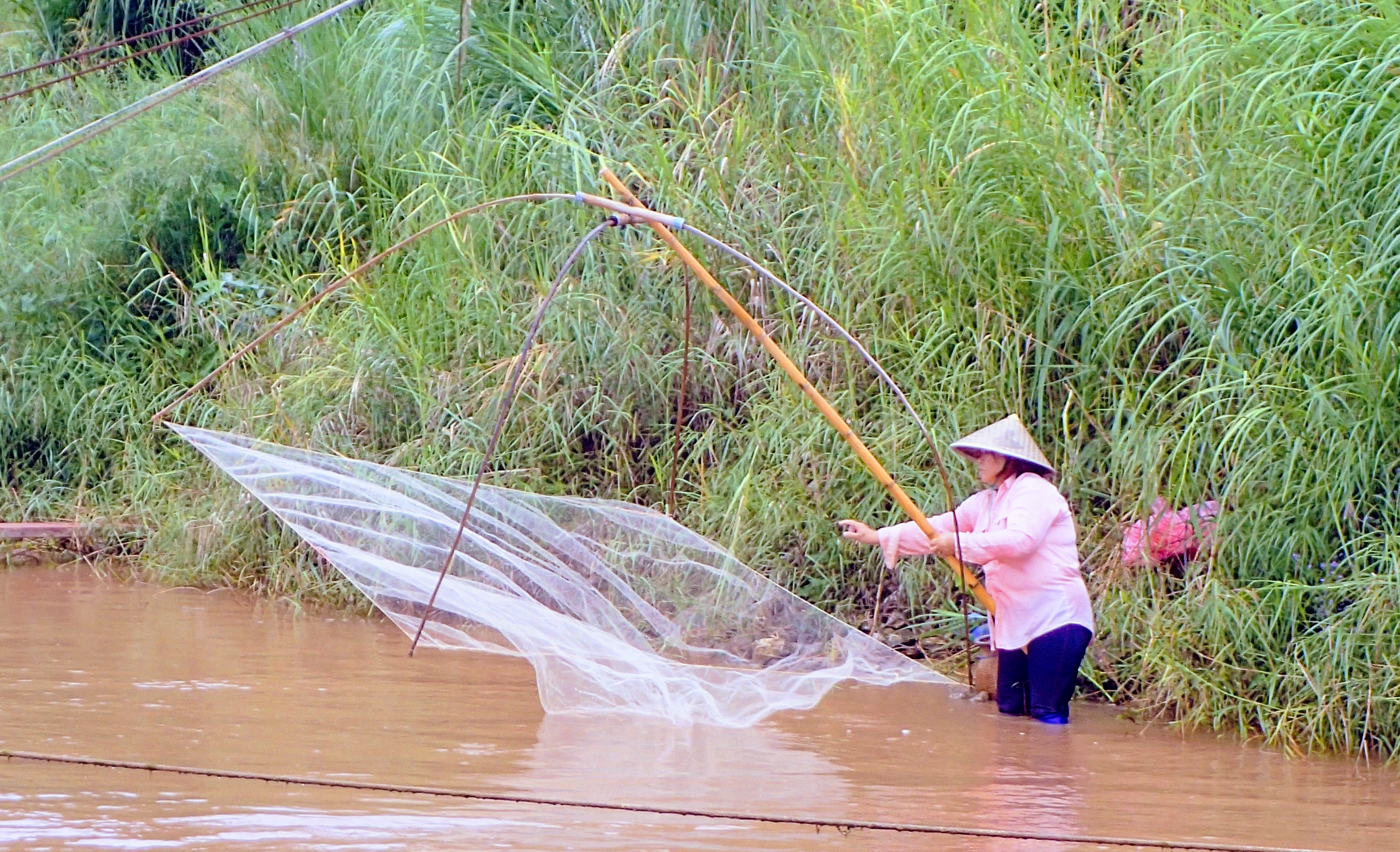
Woman with a square hand lift net in the Mekong River Thailand

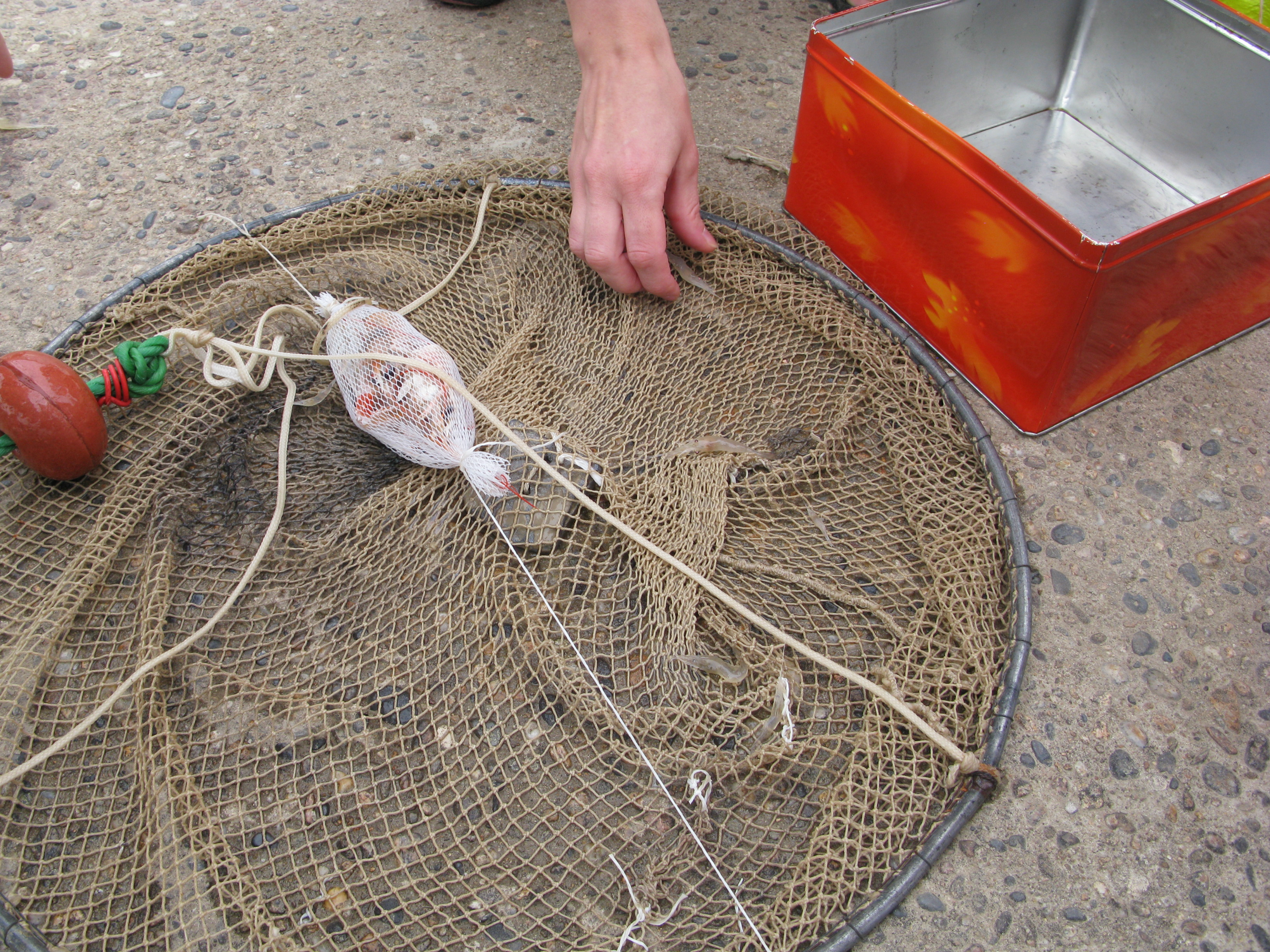
A balance, a baited lift net for catching shrimp in France

=== Shore-operated stationary lift nets ===
Stationary lift nets are larger than hand lift nets and are attached permanently to a shore-built structure. Lifting the nets may be done by hand through the use of counterweights, or they may use mechanized winches. Bait or a strong source of light is placed in the middle of the net. They are typically placed near beaches or riverbanks.

Stationary lift nets are relatively large and are usually operated from stationary installation situated along the shore. They are operated usually from the bank of a river or a suitable beach by installing them on a special platform. The more modern lift nets, are operated with the help of hand or motor driven winches. No fishing vessel is required. After being submerged at the required depth, the nets are lifted or hauled out of the water by the hand or mechanically. The fish are sometimes attracted by strong light or bait.

Stationary lift nets are mostly used to capture pelagic species and in this case boats are not often required. They are operated mainly at the water's surface either in the sea or inland waters.

Shore-operated stationary lift nets
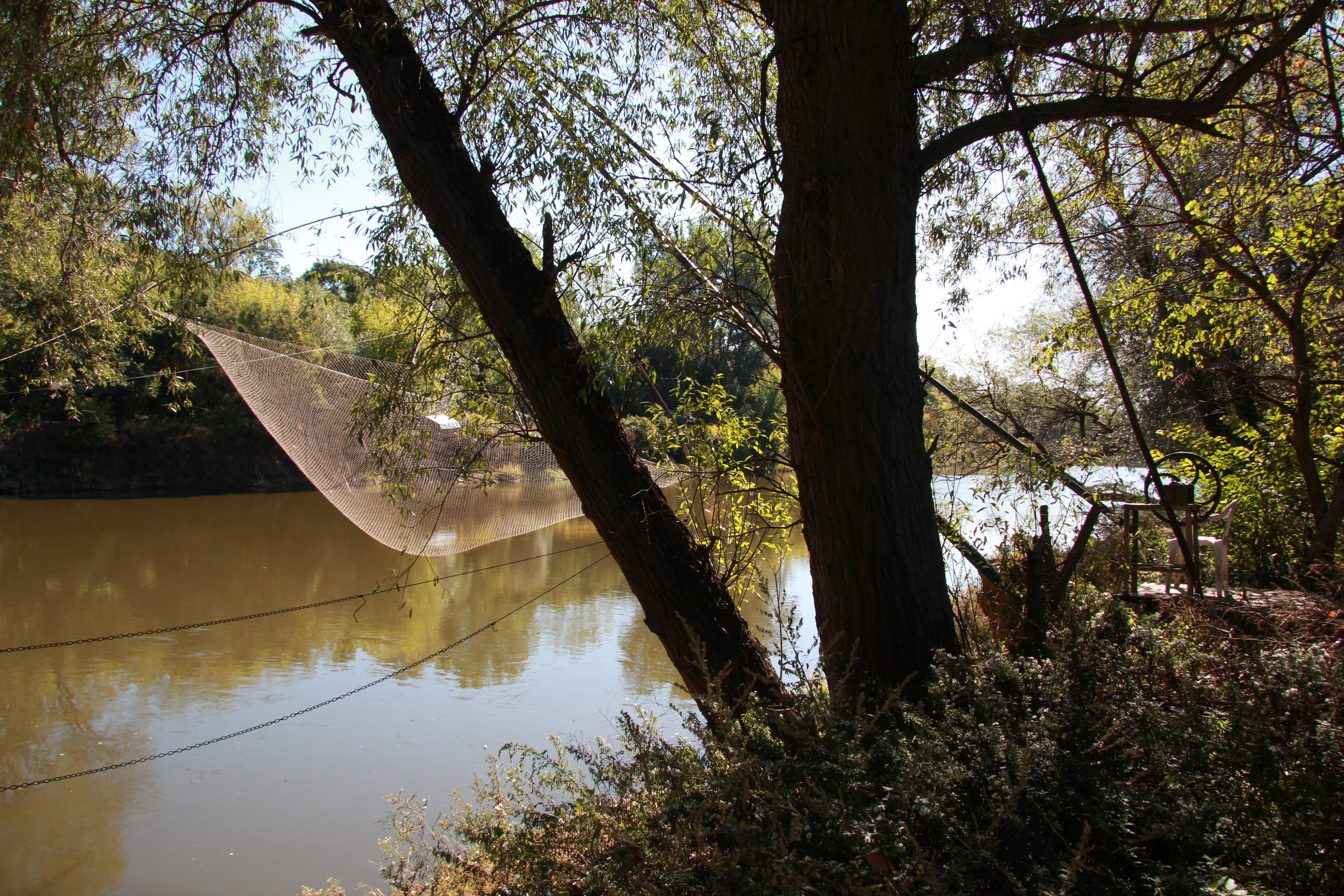
A daubel, a winch-operated lift net in Morava River, Austria

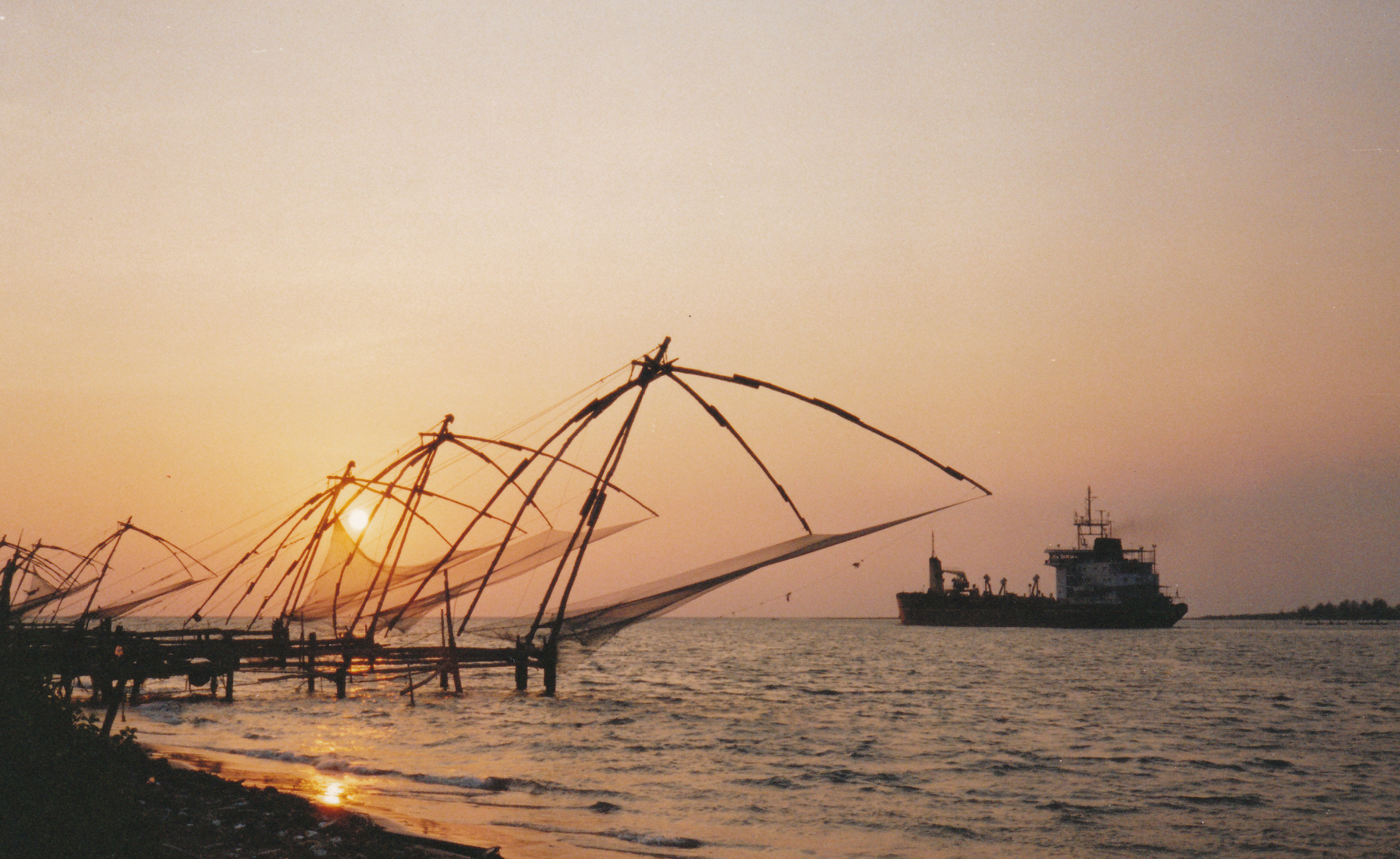
Cheena vala ("Chinese fishing nets") in Kerala, India

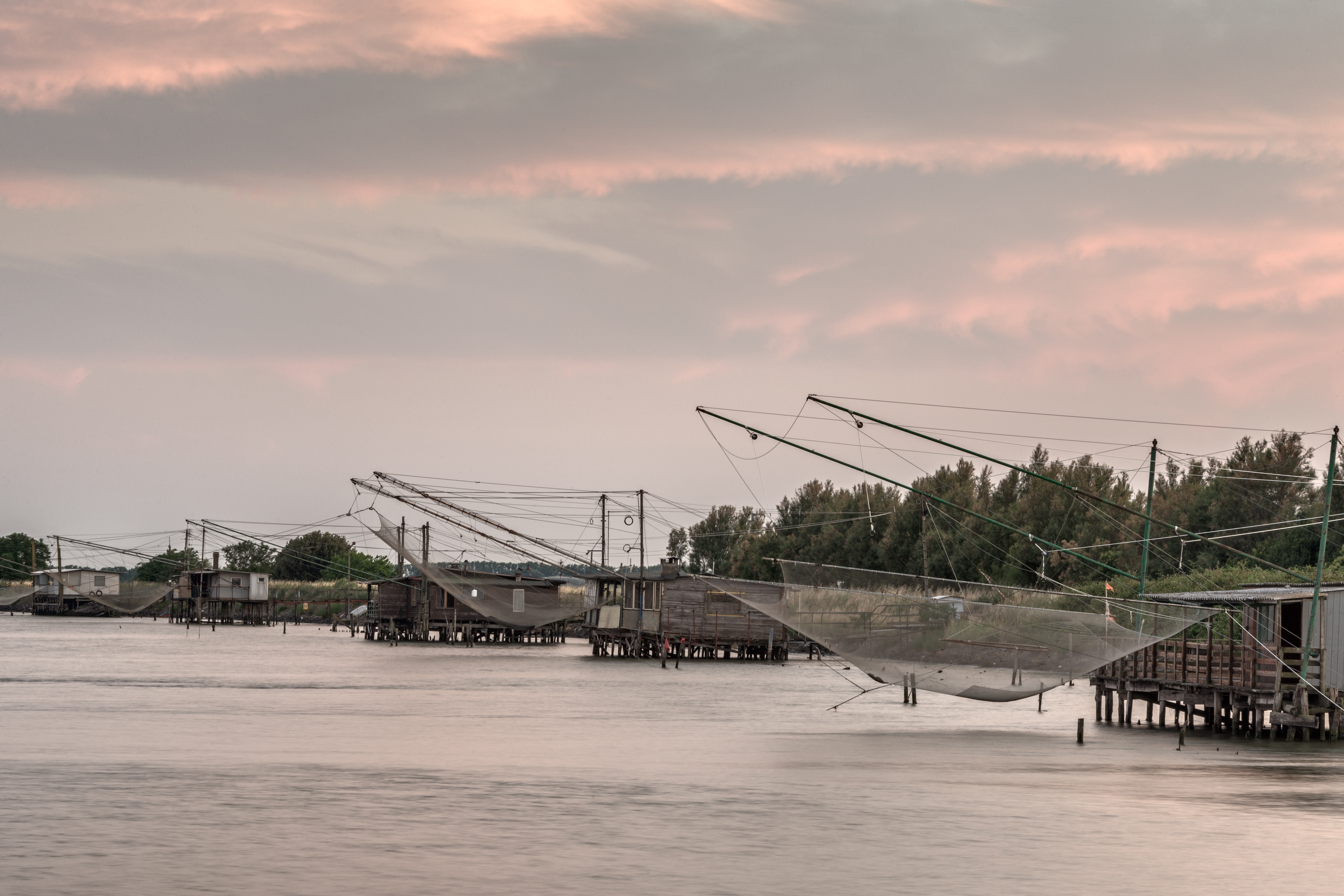
Padellone (or bilancione) lift nets in Comacchio, Ferrara, Italy

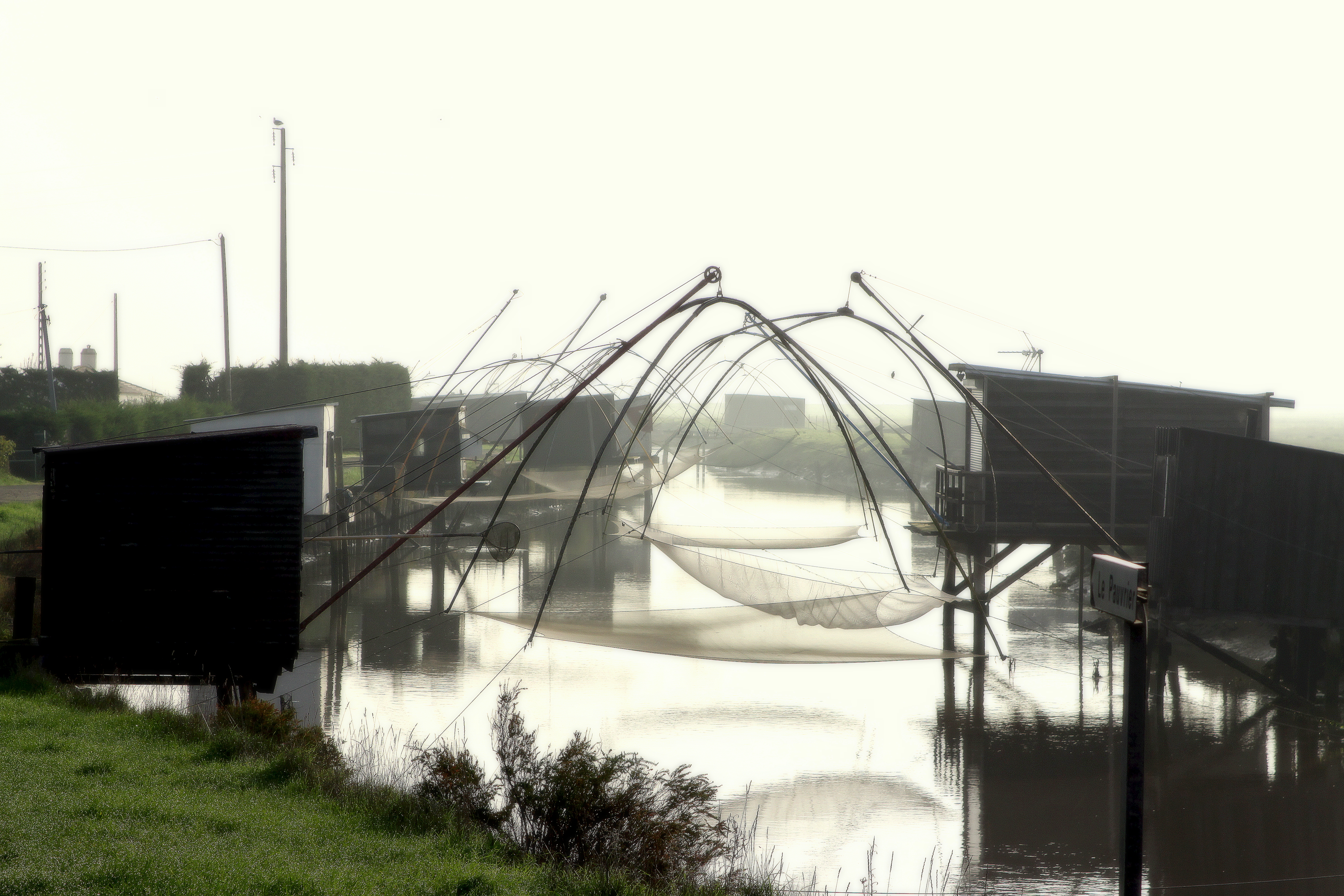
Carrelets in Sallertaine, Pays de la Loire, France

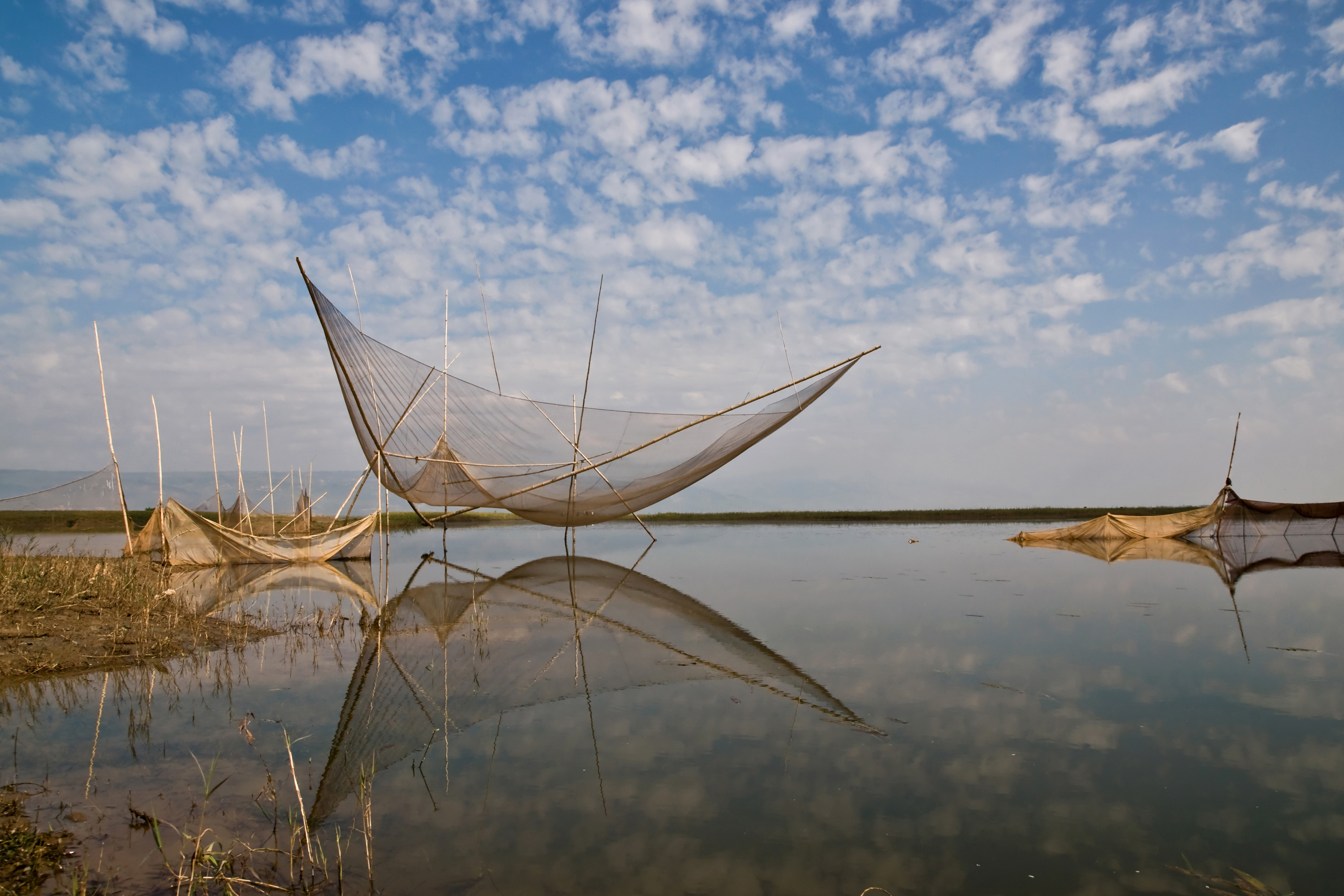
Dhormo/Bheshal jal lift nets in Bangladesh

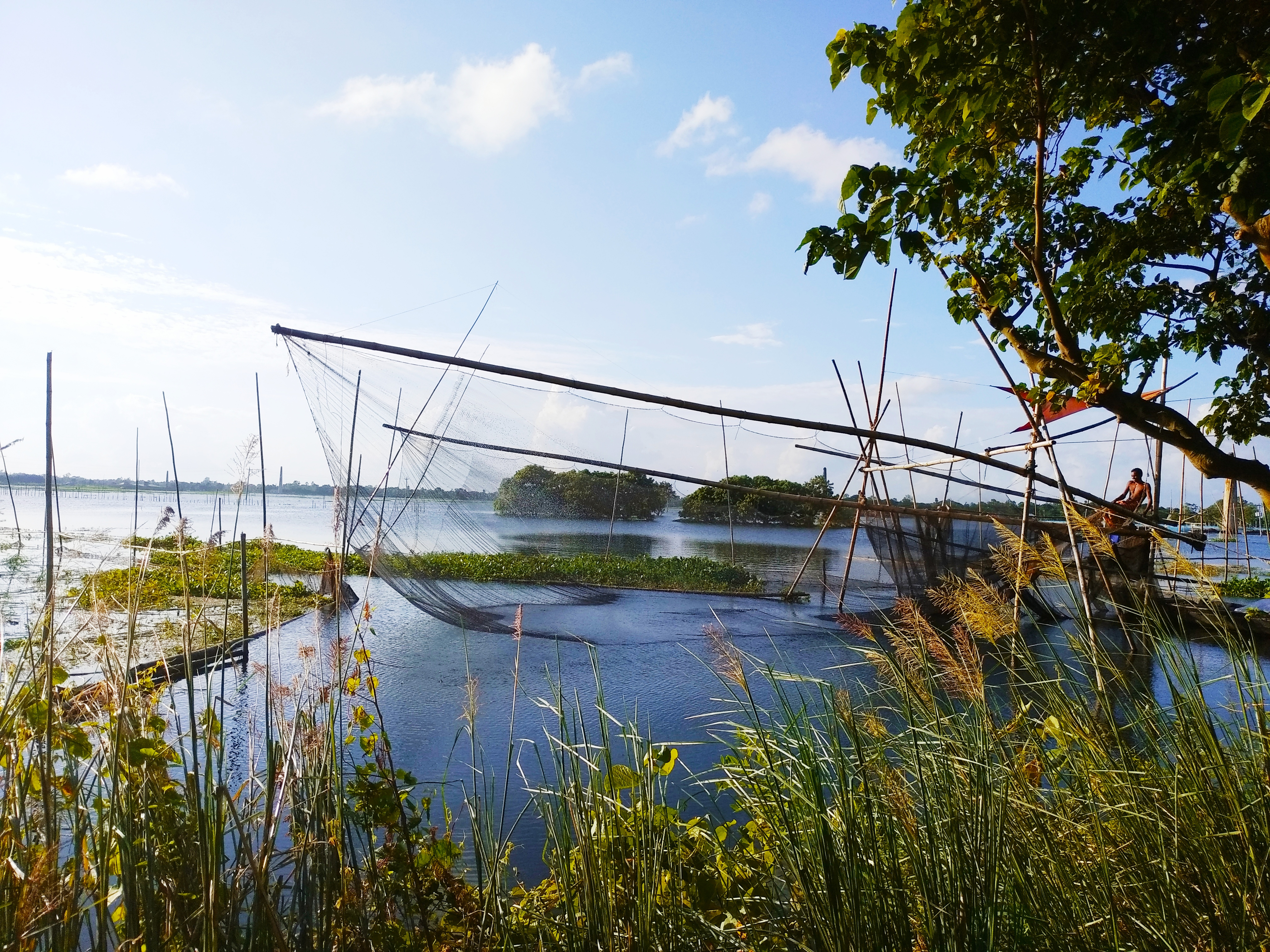
Lift net (Bhesal Jal) in Bangladesh rivers or canals

=== Boat-operated lift nets ===
Boat-operated lift nets are lift nets operated from water vessels. They may be lifted up by hand or by mechanical winches. They usually utilize several long poles attached to one side of the boat or surrounding the boat. Bait or a strong source of light is used to attract the fish.

The two types of gear are the bag net ("basnig") and the blanket net. Depending on the target species, the catch process is supported by lights or bait. Most of the target species are small pelagic species and so takes place in water areas all over the world. The net is operated from the surface in the upper column, at sea or on inland water. Sometimes a large vessel known as a lift netter is used. Boat operated lift nets are often used in small scale fisheries from small catamarans (inland fisheries in Africa) or two canoes operating together.

Impacts: The by-catch rates are low in general. But when lights are used, more species are attracted than intended, for example: cephalopods.

Boat-operated lift nets
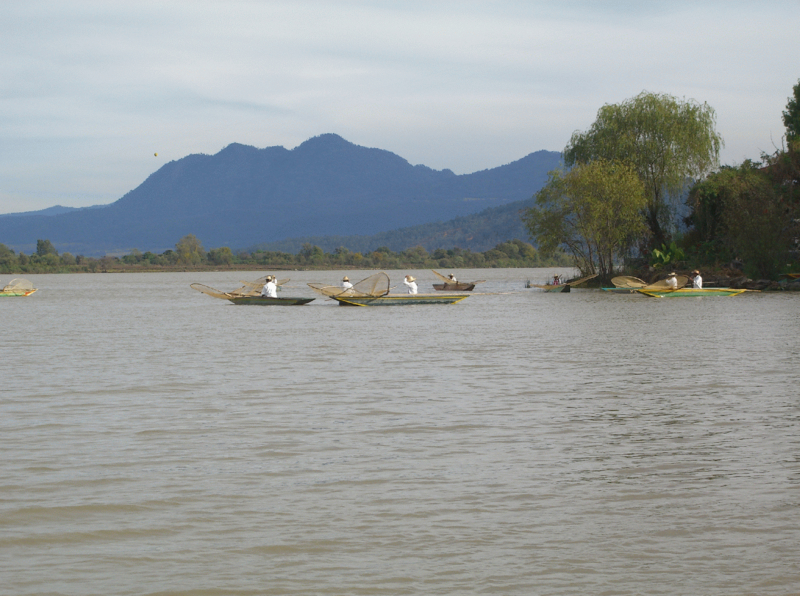
Butterfly-net fishing boats on Lake Pátzcuaro

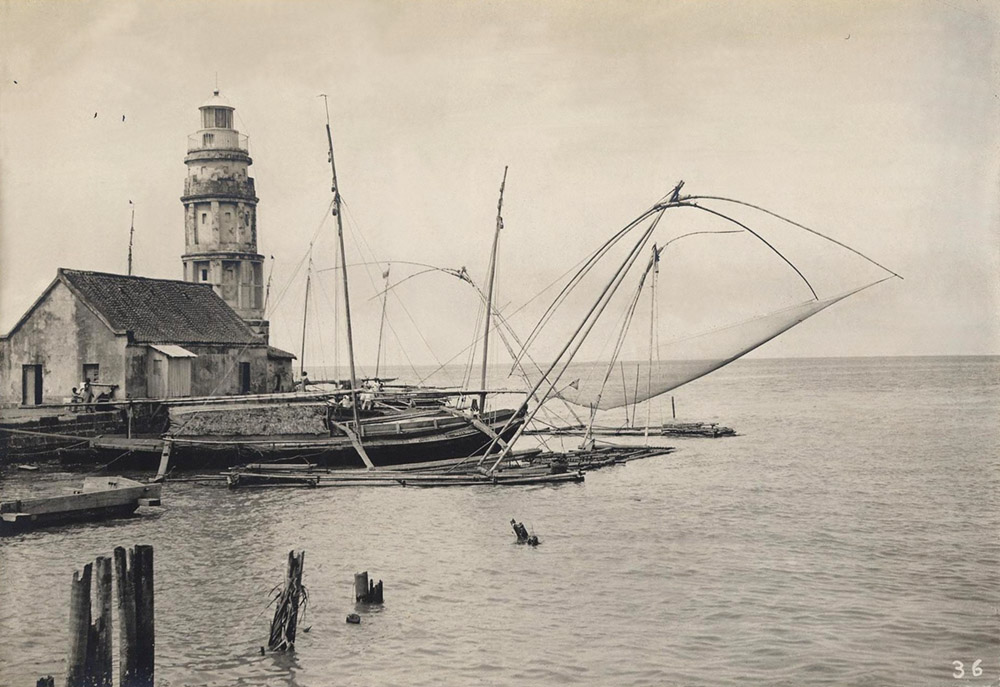
Salambaw lift net rafts beside Pasig River Light, Manila, Philippines (c. 1900–1902)

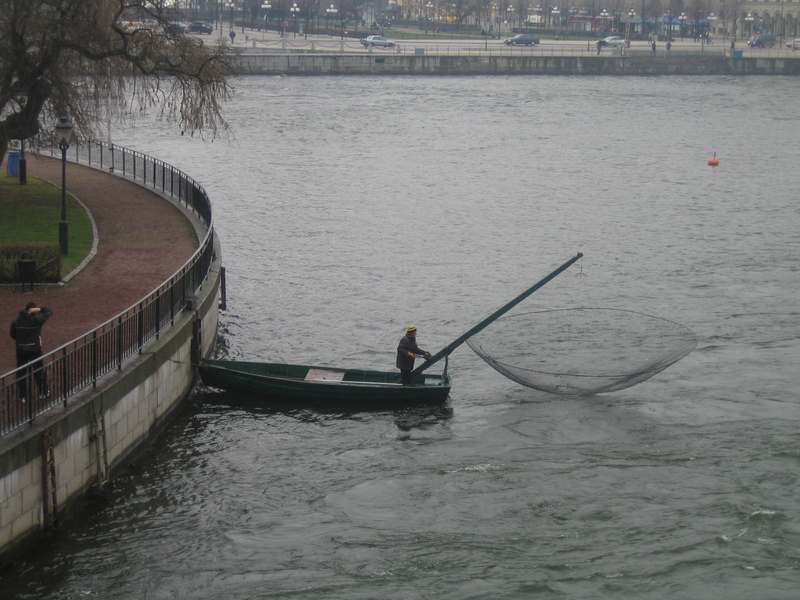
A small rowboat with an attached lift net in Norrström, Stockholm, Sweden

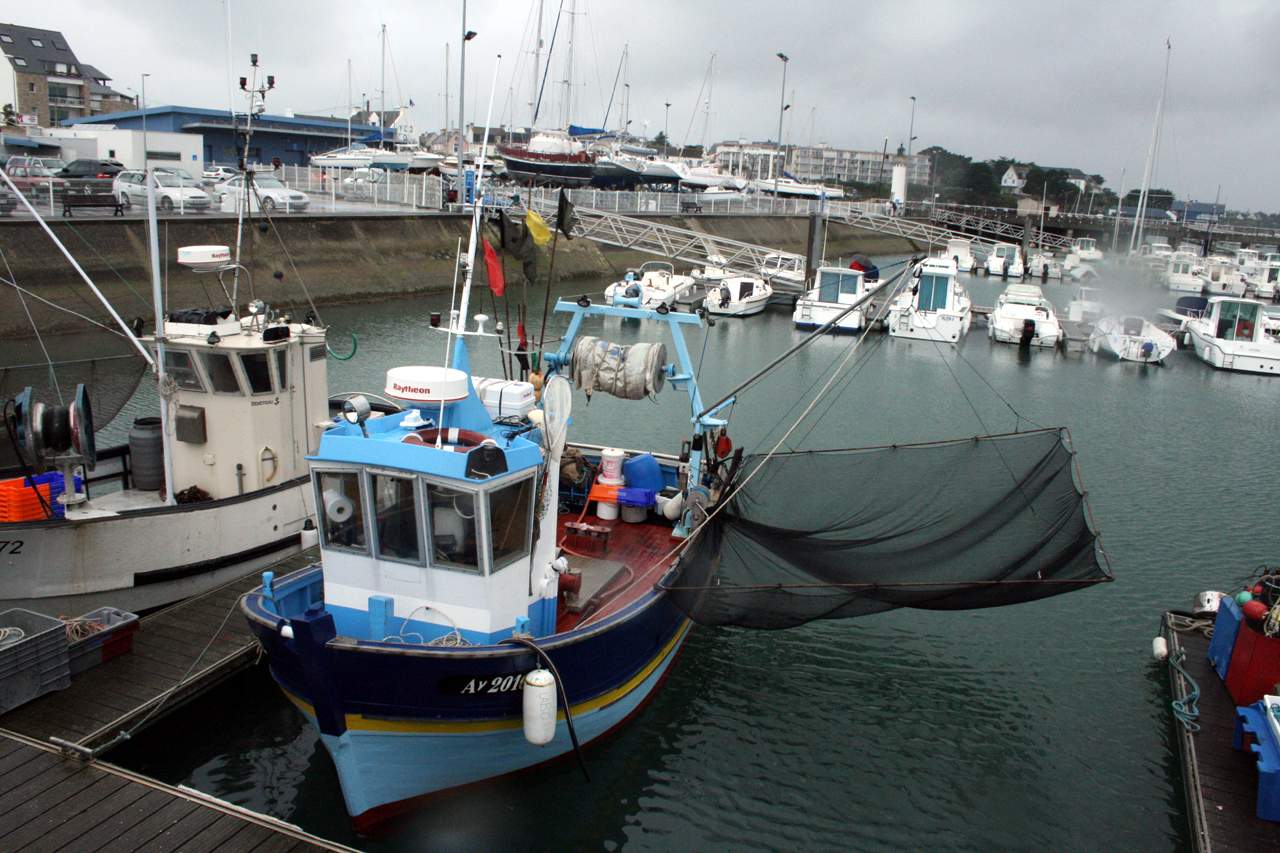
Fishing boat with a winch-operated lift net in Quiberon, France

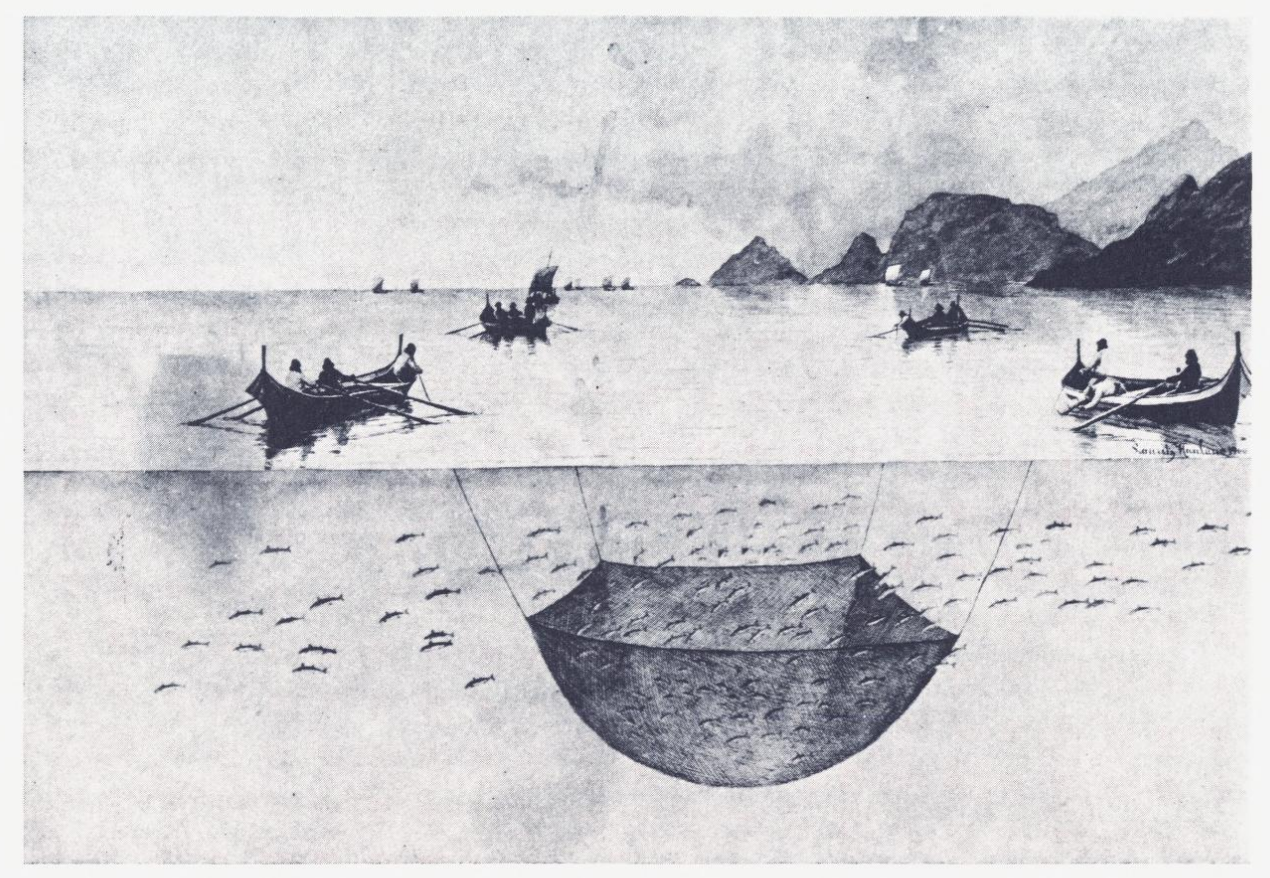
Boats fishing for saithe with a lift net along the Norwegian coast in a drawing by Lauritz Haaland (1900)

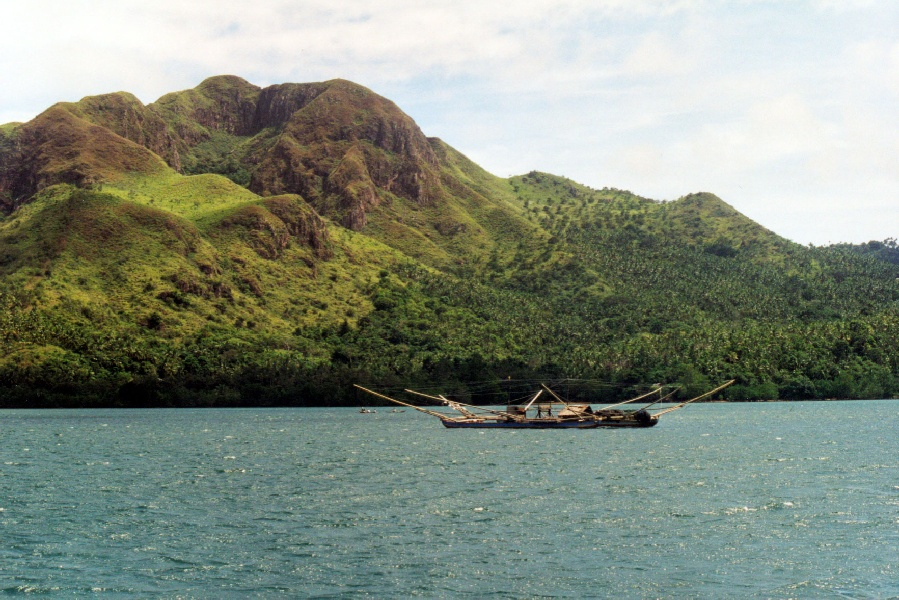
A basnigan from the Philippines with lift nets deployed

== See also ==
- Cast net – Type of fishing net
- Butterfly net – Net on a stick for catching butterflies
- Fish aggregating device – Man-made object used to attract ocean-going pelagic fish
- Trawling – Method of catching fish
