= Basnig =

Fishing technique

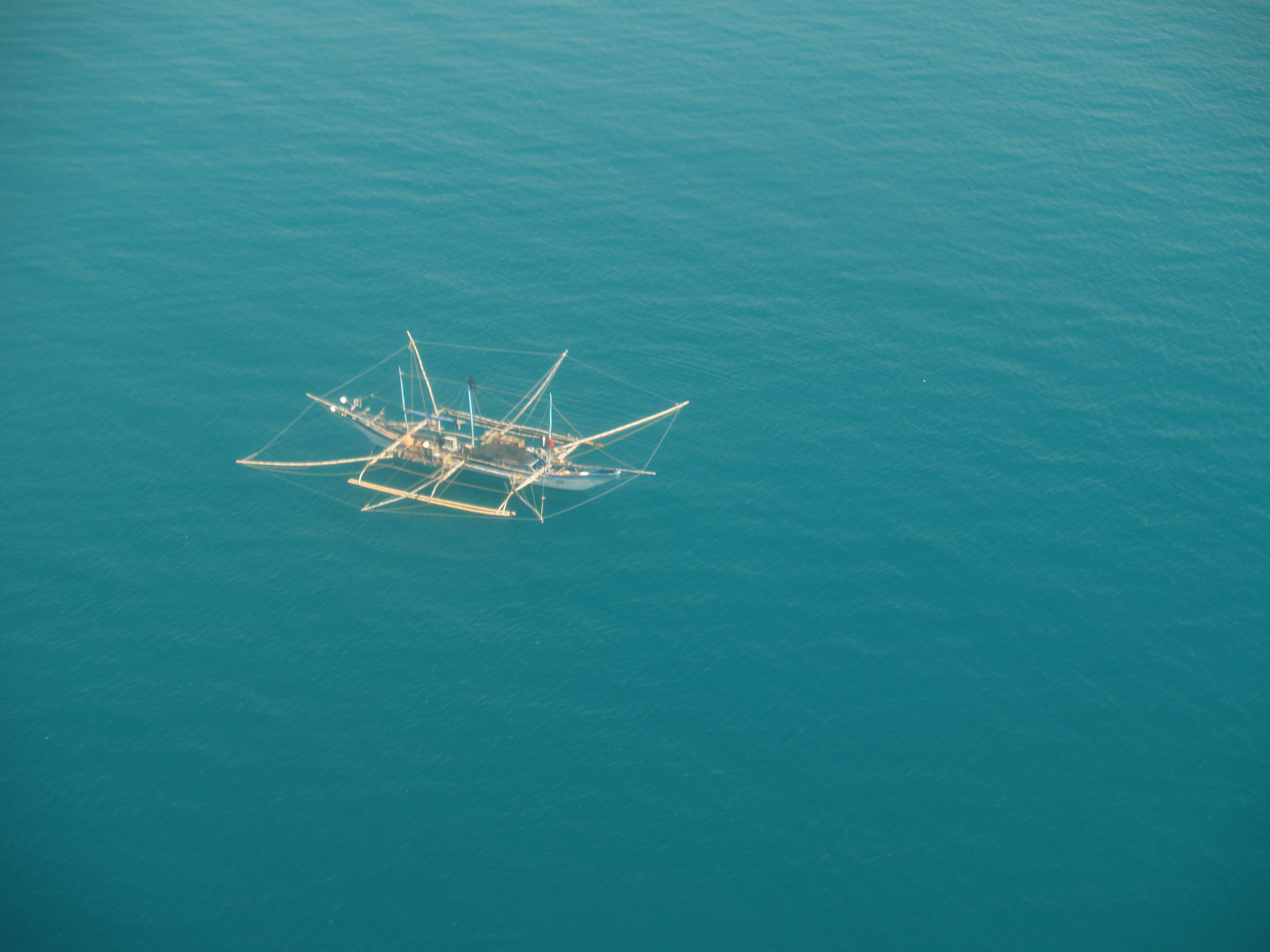
A basnigan with the nets fully deployed

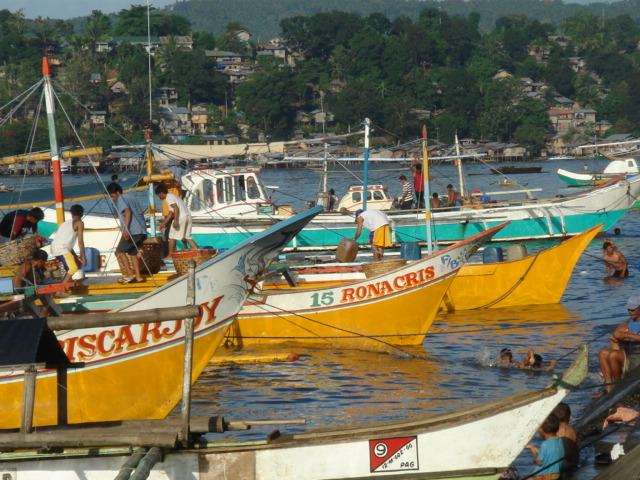
Basnigan moored in Pagadian City, Zamboanga del Sur

Basnig or balasnig are lift nets (salambaw) operated by a large outrigger boat called Basnigan. They use a large bag net suspended directly below or beside the ship. This net is attached to multiple temporary booms projecting from the ship's outriggers and detachable auxiliary masts. Modern basnig typically use generators and electric lights to attract fish and squid. This method is unique to the Philippines. It is common in the Visayas, particularly in the provinces of Capiz and Iloilo.

== Basnigan ==
Basnigan are usually made up of wood with a small ["fuente/pwente"] cabin wherein the crew sleeps and also where the ship's wheel ["timon"] is located. It also has outriggers [katig] composed of three huge logs and bamboo. They lure fish with gas powered lights during the nightly fishing trips. 24 to 30 person crew boats go to sea in the afternoon and return early the following morning.

Most signal/communications from piloto to makinista and crews are through ringing a bell because of the noise emitted by the machine/engine which is always on because it serves as an engine to run the boat and a generator during the night. Each crew member has individual responsibilities; a Pilot or Piloto is the head of the boat, and has one or two subordinates, Segunda Piloto (2nd Pilot) and sometime Tricera Piloto (3rd Pilot). The Makinista is in charge of the motor and the electrical system, the Timonil is like the driver, the Taong Lambat is in charge of the net in case of damage, the Kusinero is the Cook, and the rest are just crew members.

== Technique ==
They use bamboo rods called sungay ("horn"), each of which has a pulley at the end of the bamboo and cable attached to a net with a weight (pabigat)made of molded lead, installed at the bow and stern of the boat, two on both sides on the first section of the boat, two on both sides on the midsection of the boat and two again on the last part of the boat each of the bamboos has a pulley and cable attached to the net with molded lead as weight.

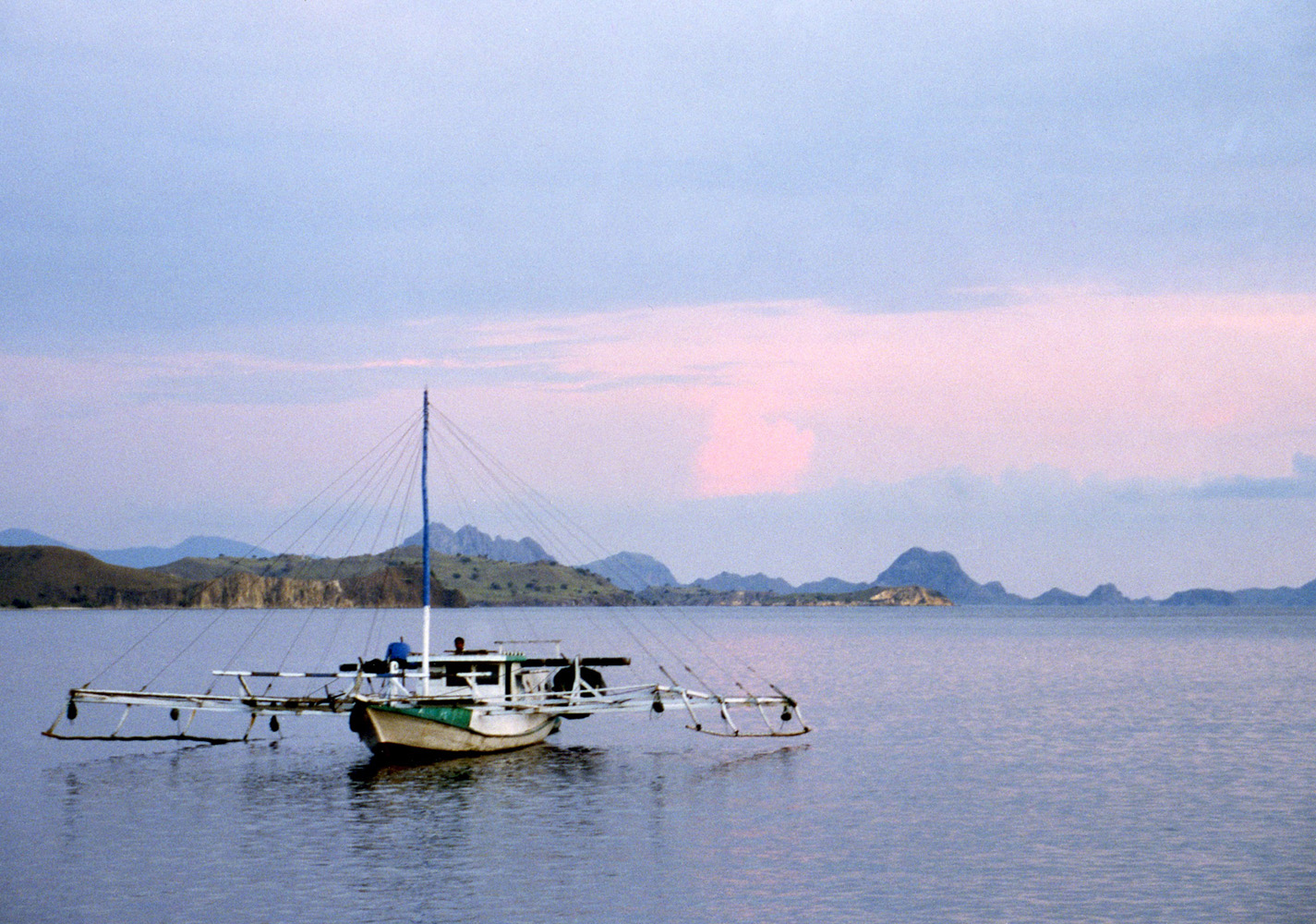
Basnigan fishing boat in Coron, Palawan. Note the pulleys on the outriggers.

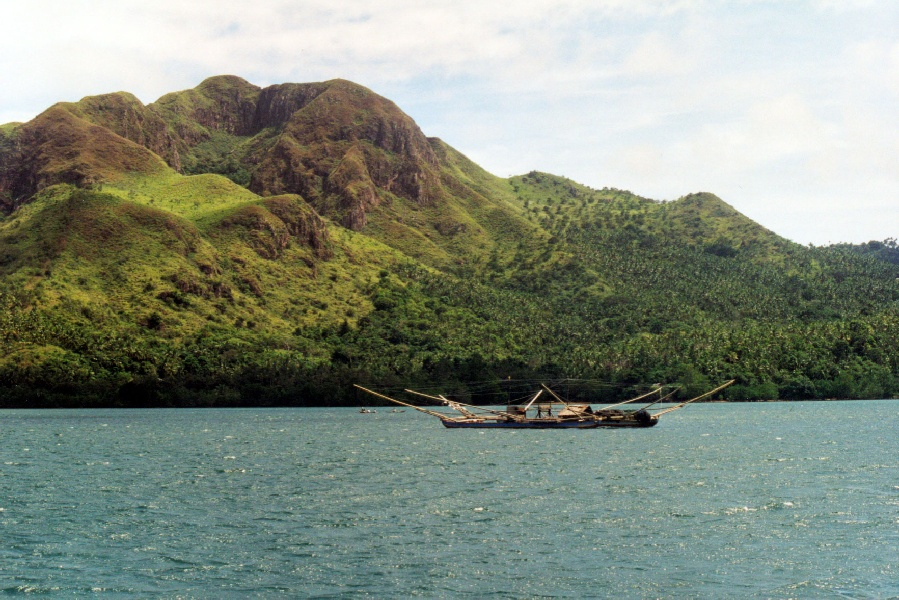
A basnigan near Basilan with nets deployed

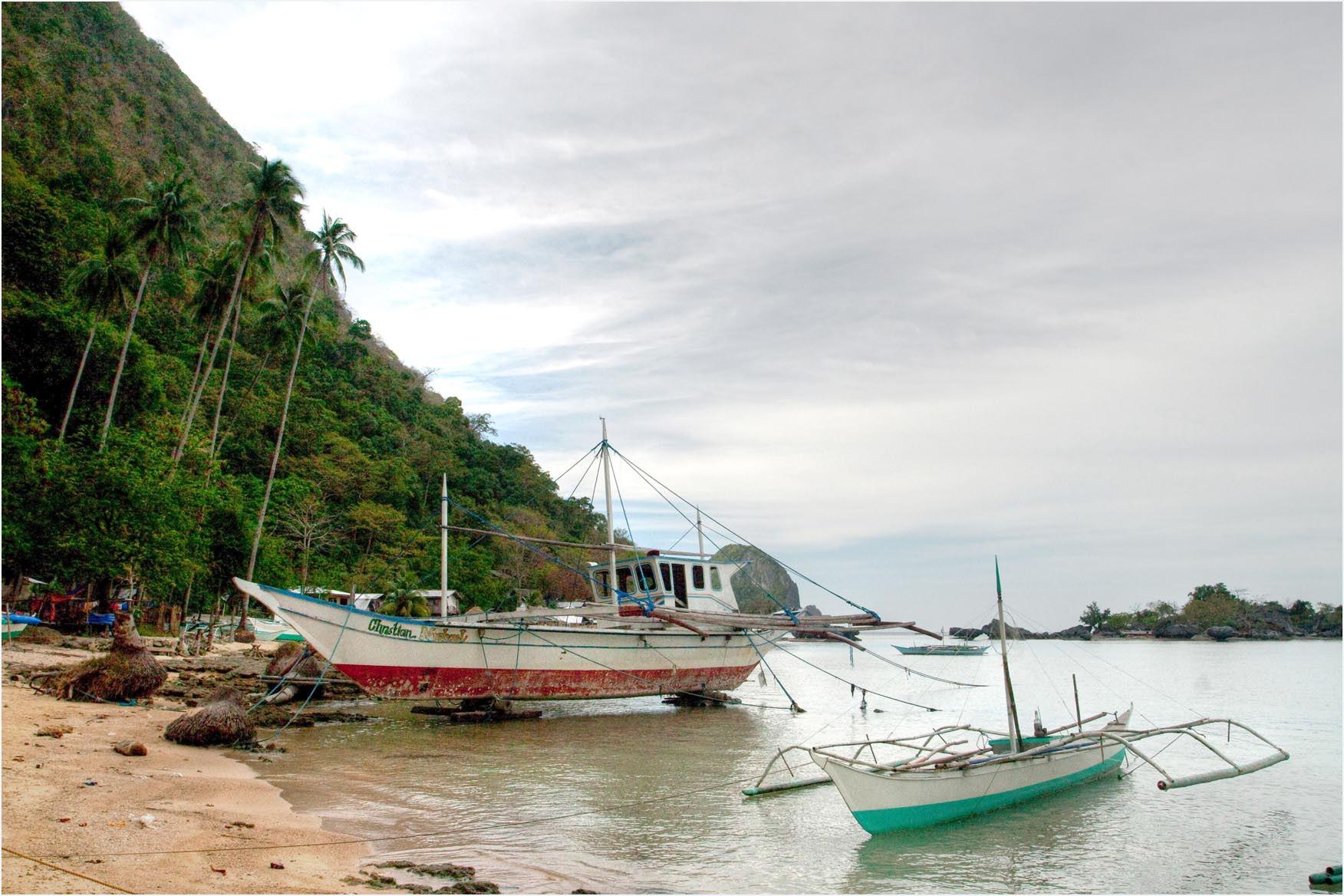
A beached basnigan boat (background) with the characteristic poles and large outriggers used for anchoring lift nets and holding gas-powered or electric lights (El Nido, Palawan)

They use huge nets and gas powered lights to attract fish after dark. The captain (piloto) of the ship observes the water, fish movements under the boat and estimates how deep the net should go then asks the crew to get ready. During the preparation of releasing the net, the central lights are turned off until those on the bow and stern will remain turned on in order to ensure the fish stays under the boat but move toward the bow and stern. Away from the center where one of the crew will measure the rope using fathoms [dipa] and will release the net based on the measurement in a very slow process. After completely releasing the net based on the measurement given by the piloto the piloto will the communicate with the machinist to turn of the lights from stern and bow to the midsection of the boat, in slow manner and in order basis.

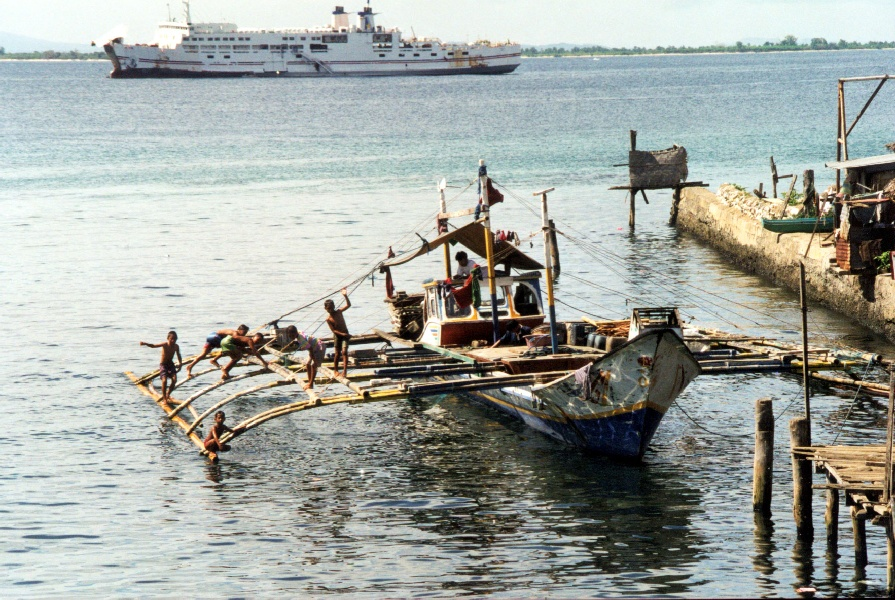
A basnigan in Basilan with children playing on the outriggers

The piloto will then communicate with the machinist to turn off the lights from each section. First, the bow and stern then the next section until the only remaining light is the light in the midsection. The Piloto will sometimes use a lid [saklob] that looks like a pail with no bottom or a funnel. This makes the light become thinner like a laser effect these will make the group of fish to compress. The piloto will now give the signal to the crew to start pulling the ropes. The basnig has a total of 8 poles, each poles will have at least 3 crew members one to stop the rope and the two crews pulls the rope. When the [pabigat] weight/net is already one meter above the water one of the crew will walk through the outrigger to pull the net to the side of the boat usually the right side of the boat then the crews from the left side of the boat will pull the net to the right side of the boat. Then the rest of the net will be pulled up by the crew at the right side of the boat until the catch are visible.

The piloto will then instruct the crew of two who will manually operate a huge fish net to get the fish into the boat. Then a net will be deployed in the middle part of the boat to temporarily put the live fish for separation. After a few minutes the crew will then start the segregation of the fish according to type and will be stored in a Styrofoam box with crushed ice. A basnig catch mostly composed of types of scad fish, mackerel, tuna, sardines, red fish, anchovy, squid and a few other fishes and crustaceans.

Basnig can also be done by two or more smaller boats working together, in which case the vessel carrying the attracting lamp is called the lawagan.

== See also ==
- Falua
- Salambaw
- Lepa (ship)
- Balangay
- Bagan, similar fishing instrument from Indonesia
