= Hand net =

Type of fishing net

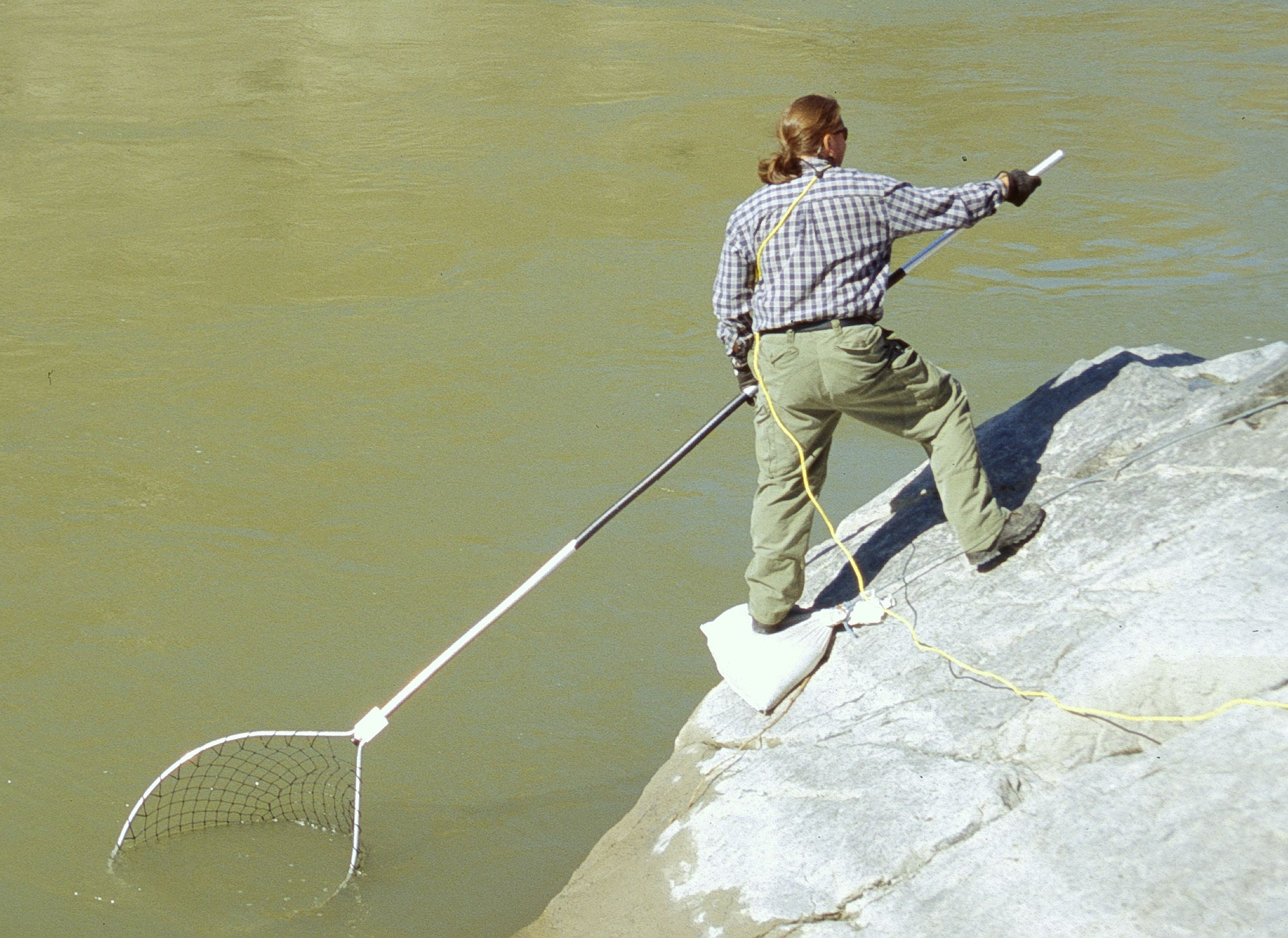
Fishing with a dip net for salmon on the Fraser River, Canada

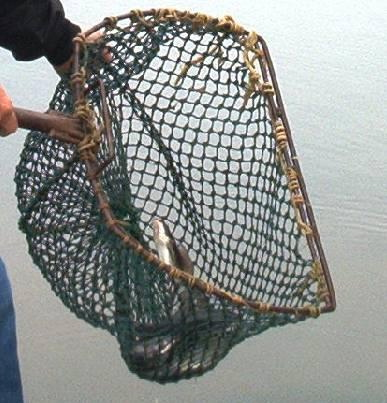
Landing net

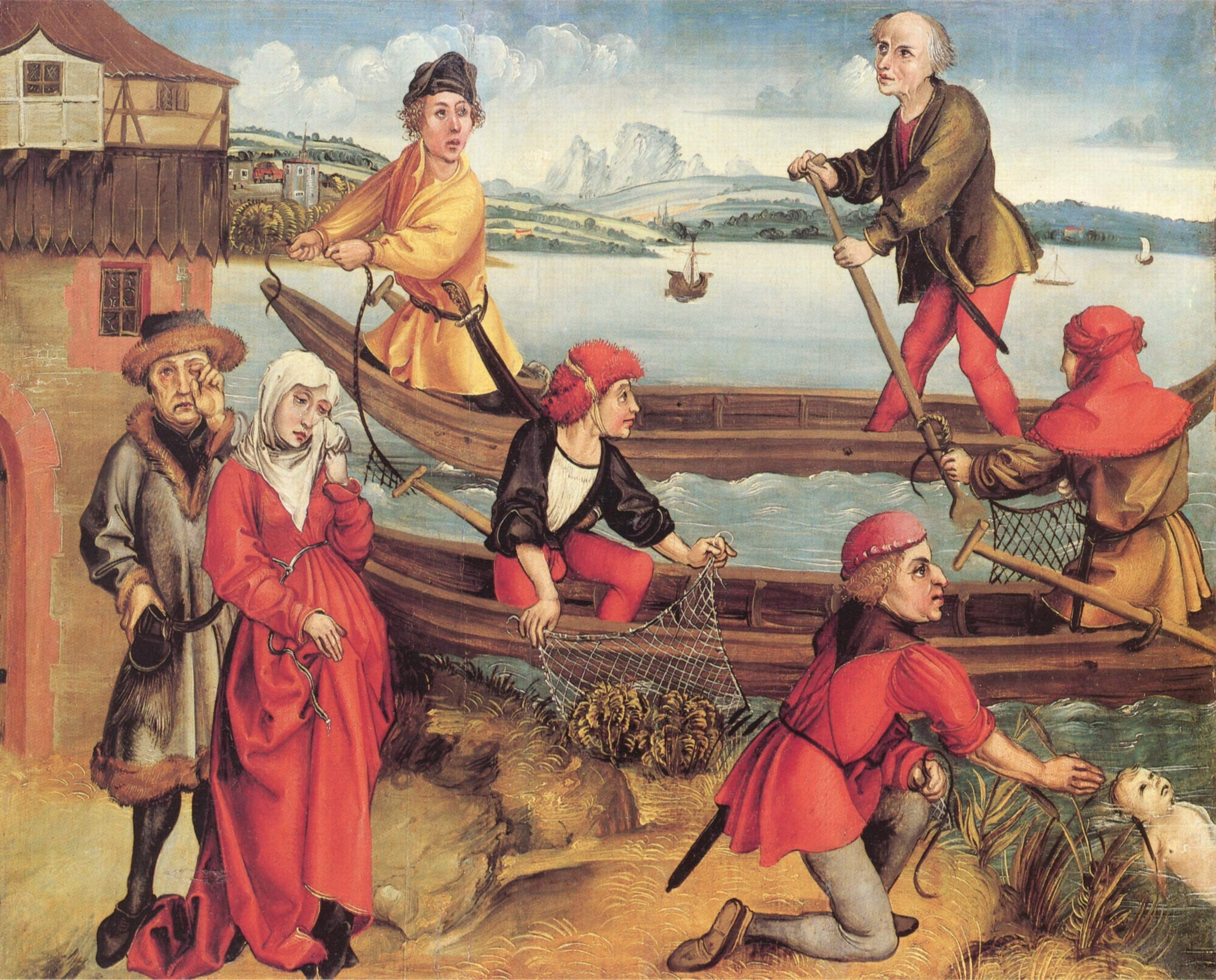
Albrecht Dürer. Fishermen with hand nets, c 1490-1493

A hand net, also called a scoop net, is a handheld fishing net or meshed basket used to capture and retrieve objects from water, somewhat in the manner of a sieve. It is distinguished from other fishing nets in that the net or mesh is supported by a rigid circular or polygonal frame, which may or may not be mounted to the end of a handle.

A hand net with a long handle is often called a dip net. When it is used by an angler to help "fetch out" or "land" a hooked fish, it is called a landing net.

Hand nets have been used since antiquity for catching fish near the surface of the water, especially feisty, powerful ones such as muskellunge or northern pike. Because hand-netting is not physically destructive to the fish, hand nets are often used for tag and release, or to retrieve aquarium fish. There are popular contemporary dip net sockeye salmon fisheries in Chitina, Kenai River and Kasilof River, typically lasting two to three weeks, and is regarded as a subsistence fishery for Alaskan residents only. Dip nets can also be used to scoop crabs in shallow water. The basket is made of wire or nylon mesh, rather than cloth mesh, since crabs fight, bite, twist and turn when they are caught.

== History ==
Hand nets have been widely used by traditional fishermen. Small fish are caught both in the shallow water of lagoons and in the open sea. They are made in different sizes ranging from small nets held in one hand to large scoop nets worked by several men. Historically, the Karuk people of the upper Klamath River harvested fish with dip nets.

In England, hand netting is the only legal way of catching eels and has been practised for thousands of years on the River Parrett and River Severn.

== Gallery ==
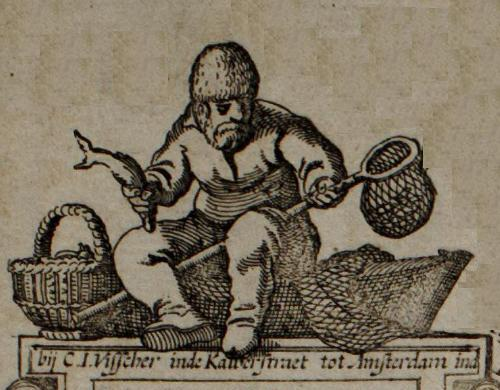
A "fisher logo" of Claes Jansz. Visscher, showing a hand net, 1630.

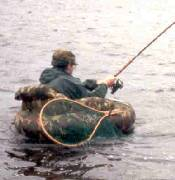
An angler in a float tube with his landing net.

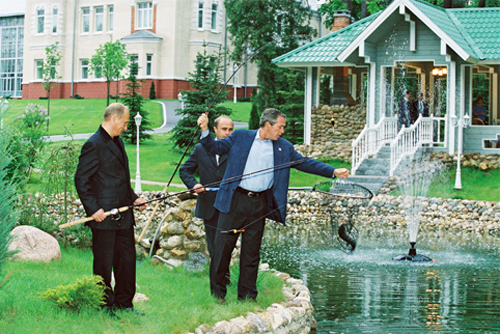
George Bush and Vladimir Putin fish from a fish pond, while an aide holds a landing net

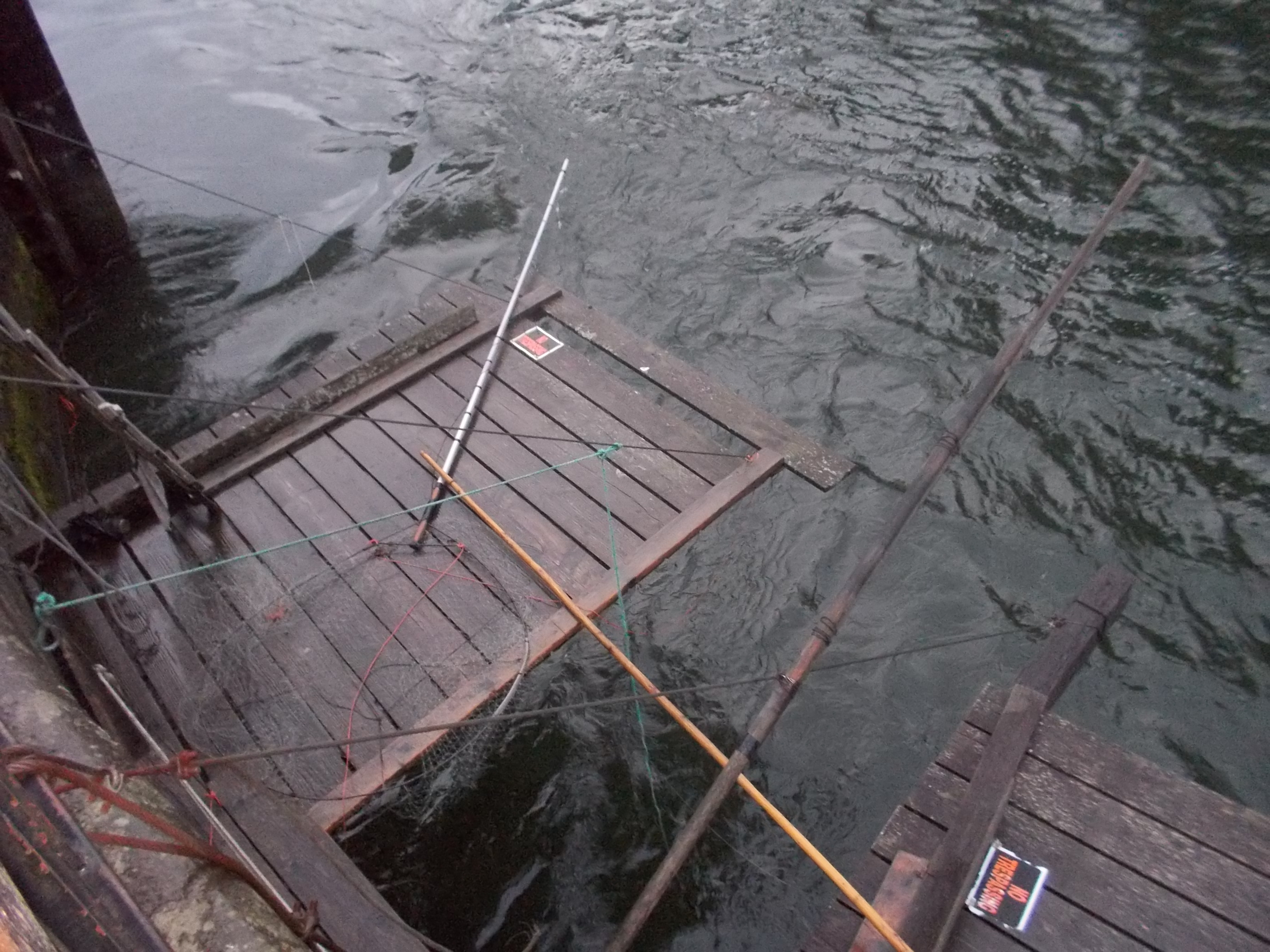
Dipnet fishing platform on the Columbia River in Cascade Locks, Oregon

== See also ==
- Lift net
- Cast net
- Butterfly net
