= Pasig River Lighthouse =

Historic lighthouse in Manila, Philippines

Pasig River Light
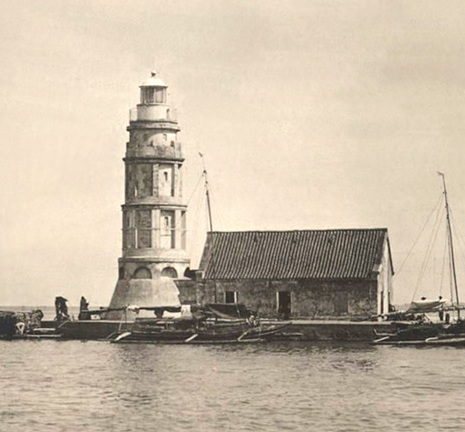
- The Pasig River Lighthouse on the north jetty of Pasig river mouth
- Location: San Nicolas, Manila, Philippines
- Coordinates: 14°35′47″N 120°57′39″E

Tower
- Constructed: 1846
- Construction: rubble masonry (foundation), concrete block (tower)
- Height: 14 metres (46 ft)
- Shape: cylindrical five-story tower with balcony and lantern
- Markings: white tower (pre 1877, yellow tower (post 1877)
- Heritage: Marked Historical Structure no. PH-00-0173

Light
- First lit: 1 September 1846
- Deactivated: 1992
- Focal height: 51 ft (16 m), 53.3 ft (16.2 m)
- Lens: sixth-order, dioptric
- Range: 10 miles (16 km) (second 1846), 9 miles (14 km) (second 1877)
- Characteristic: F W (–1877), F R (1877–)
- Active light
- Construction: reinforced concrete
- Height: 46 ft (14 m)
- Shape: conical
- Markings: Unpainted (tower)
- Operator: Philippine Coast Guard
- First lit: 1992
- Focal height: 43 ft (13 m)
- Characteristic: Fl W 5s

The Pasig River Light was the first light station in the Philippines when it was established in 1642. The first lighthouse tower in the country was erected in the station and first lit in 1846. It was then located on the north jetty at the mouth of the Pasig River in San Nicolas, Manila, marking the entrance of the river for vessels cruising Manila Bay, looking to dock on the inland Port of Manila that was then located along the banks of the Pasig River in Binondo and Intramuros.

The first lighthouse, which was known locally as Farola (Spanish for "lighthouse"), was one of the most conspicuous landmarks in the harbor of Manila from the time it was built till the early part of 20th century. The construction and land reclamation of the new Port of Manila along Manila Bay, south of the light station, and the subsequent expansion and reclamation north and west of the tower, had greatly altered the location of the lighthouse, obscuring the light from the wide expanse of Manila Bay. Its former location and the location of its replacement tower is about 1.5 kilometres (0.93 mi) upriver from the present mouth of the river

== History ==
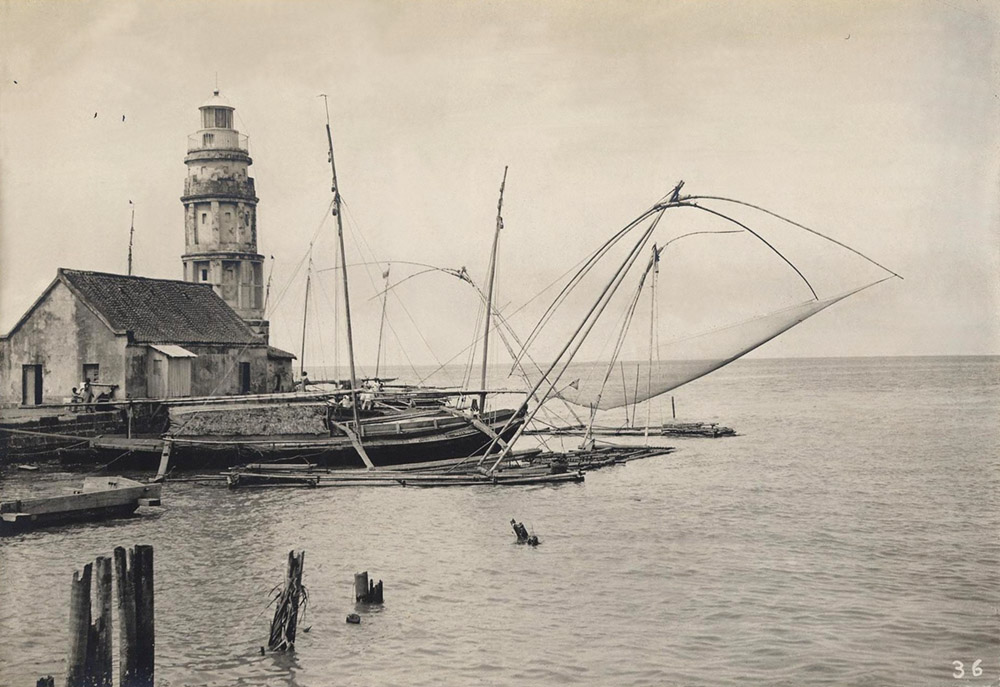
The Pasig Lighthouse at a different angle showing the tangent sides of the tower. In the center of the picture is a salambaw, a traditional Filipino fishing raft made from bamboo. Image was taken around 1900–1902.

A light station had been established on the site since 1642, but it was not until over two centuries later that a lighthouse tower would be built on the location by the ruling Spanish government. The first lighthouse tower was erected and later lit on September 1, 1846. From its location at the mouth of the historic Pasig River, which divides Manila into north and south sections, the light was a welcoming beacon for all mariners of inter-island vessels entering the Pasig River and bringing their vessels up for berthing along its busy wharves.

On September 20, 1870, the light apparatus of the lighthouse was replaced with a new fixed red light with a shorter visibility because of its color, but easily distinguishable from the other lights of the city than the former white. The 1877 almanac also noted that the color of the lighthouse was changed from white to yellow (amarillo) and was manned by two lighthouse keepers.

The Spanish colonial lighthouse was demolished in 1992 for unknown reasons, without regard for its historical significance.

== 1846 lighthouse tower ==
The 49-foot (15 m) cylindrical first tower was a five-story stone tower including the gallery-lantern room. The unique feature about this lighthouse was the placement of the first four levels, which were in tangent circles if seen from above (meaning the four circles are sharing one point of their sides or in tangent), except for the gallery-lantern room, which is centered above the fourth level. Behind the tower was the lighthouse keepers house that was detached from the tower also made of masonry.

The white tower had an effective focal point height of 52 feet (16 m) above sea level and sat at the end of the north jetty at the Pasig River mouth. Its original light was a fixed white light visible for 10 miles (16 km).

== New lighthouse ==
The replacement tower is made with reinforced concrete and built on the foundation of the old tower. The present tower is an unpainted gray concrete conical structure with a focal plane of 43 feet (13 m) above water and a tower height of 46 feet (14 m), slightly shorter than the old tower at 49 feet (15 m).

The present station does not serve its original function as the light is now obscured from Manila Bay by the present and much larger Port of Manila along Manila Bay. The Philippine Coast Guard Station of Manila is located adjacent to the lighthouse and the shantytown community that developed from the reclaimed lands is now known as "Parola" (Filipino for "lighthouse").

All lighthouses in the Philippines and other aids to navigation are maintained by the Maritime Safety Services Command division of the Philippine Coast Guard.

== See also ==
- List of lighthouses in the Philippines

== Sources ==
- Rowlett, Russ. "Spanish Lighthouses of the Philippines". The Lighthouse Directory. University of North Carolina at Chapel Hill.
