= Gillnetting =

Type of fishing net

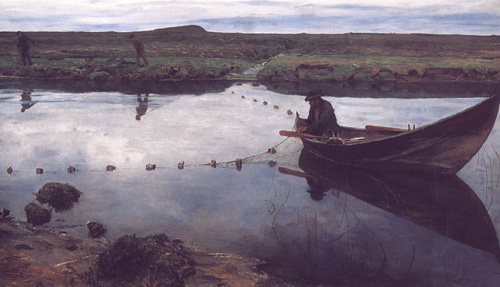
Oil painting of gillnetting, The salmon fisher, by Eilif Peterssen

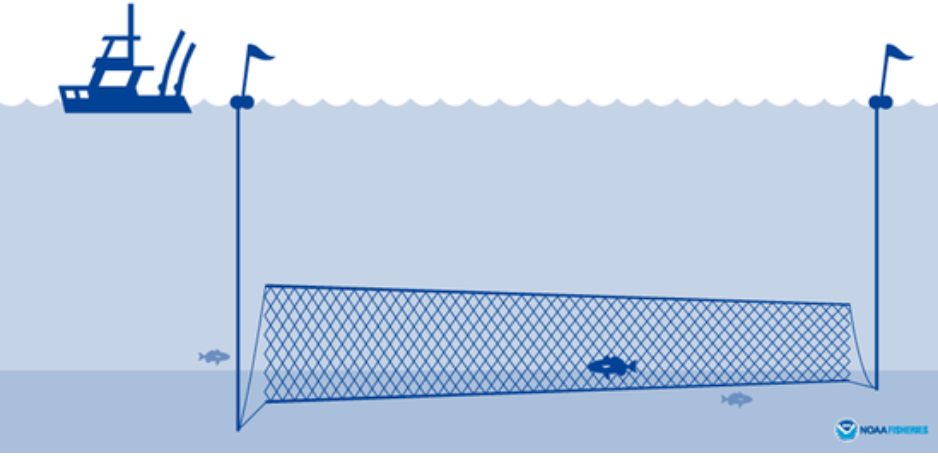
National Oceanic and Atmospheric Administration illustration of a gillnet

Gillnetting is a fishing method that uses gillnets: vertical panels of netting that hang from a line with regularly spaced floaters that hold the line on the surface of the water. The floats are sometimes called "corks" and the line with corks is generally referred to as a "cork line." The line along the bottom of the panels is generally weighted. Traditionally this line has been weighted with lead and may be referred to as "lead line." A gillnet is normally set in a straight line. Gillnets can be characterized by mesh size, as well as colour and type of filament from which they are made. Fish may be caught by gillnets in three ways:

1. Wedged – held by the mesh around the body.
2. Gilled – held by mesh slipping behind the opercula.
3. Tangled – held by teeth, spines, maxillaries, or other protrusions without the body penetrating the mesh.

Most fish have gills. A fish swims into a net and passes only part way through the mesh. When it struggles to free itself, the twine slips behind the gill cover and prevents escape.

Gillnets are so effective that their use is closely monitored and regulated by fisheries management and enforcement agencies. Mesh size, twine strength, as well as net length and depth are all closely regulated to reduce bycatch of non-target species. Gillnets have a high degree of size selectivity. Most salmon fisheries in particular have an extremely low incidence of catching non-target species.

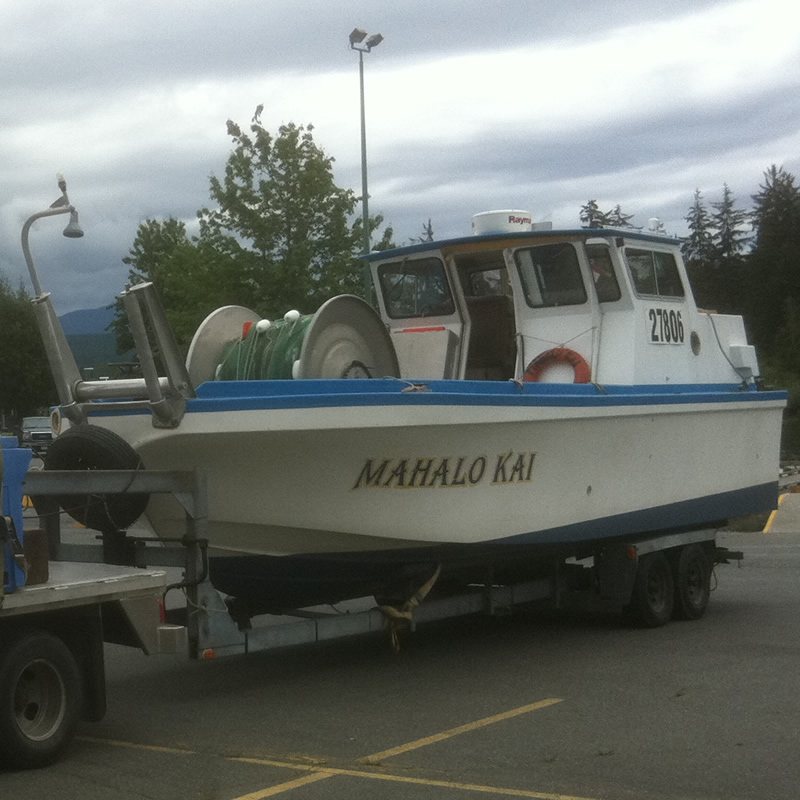
Contemporary Canadian commercial salmon bowpicker on trailer. Gillnet is evident on the metal drum in the bow of the boat.

A fishing vessel rigged to fish by gillnetting is a gillnetter. A gillnetter which deploys its gillnet from the bow is a bowpicker, while one which deploys its gillnet from the stern is a sternpicker. Gillnets differ from seines in that the latter uses a tighter weave to trap fish in an enclosed space, rather than directly catching the fish as in a gillnet.

== History ==
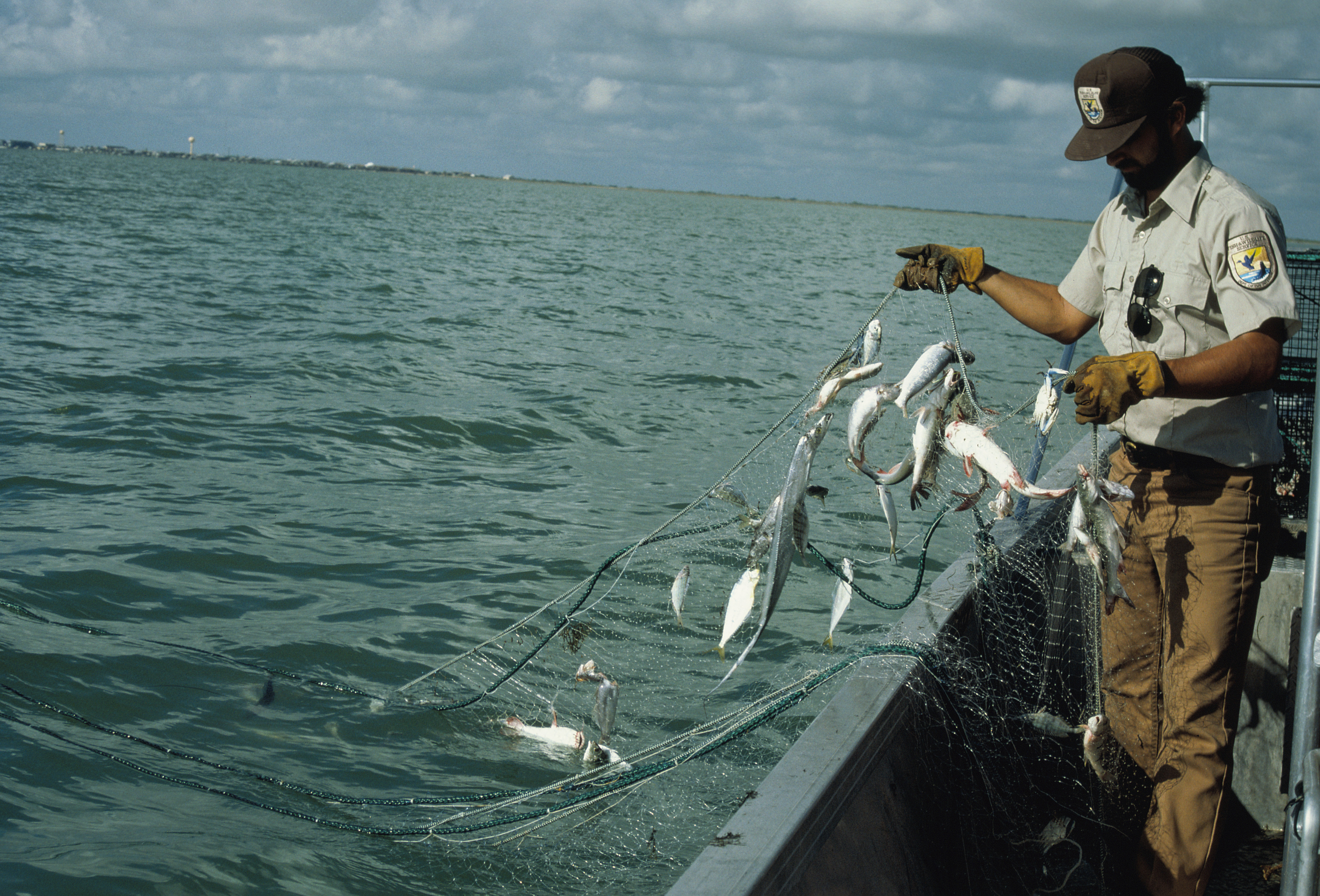
Fish and Wildlife Service worker on boat checking gillnet full of fish.

Gillnets existed in ancient times, as archaeological evidence from the Middle East demonstrates. In North America, Native American fishermen used cedar canoes and natural fibre nets, e.g., made with nettles or the inner bark of cedar. They would attach stones to the bottom of the nets as weights, and pieces of wood to the top, to use as floats. This allowed the net to suspend straight up and down in the water. Each net would be suspended either from shore or between two boats. Native fishers in the Pacific Northwest, Canada, and Alaska still commonly use gillnets in their fisheries for salmon and steelhead.

Both drift gillnets and setnets have long been used by cultures around the world. There is evidence of fisheries exploitation, including gillnetting, going far back in Japanese history, with many specific details available from the Edo period (1603–1868). Fisheries in the Shetland Islands, which were settled by Norsemen during the Viking Age, share cultural and technological similarities with Norwegian fisheries, including gillnet fisheries for herring. Many of the Norwegian immigrant fishermen who came to fish in the great Columbia River salmon fishery during the second half of the 19th century did so because they had experience in the gillnet fishery for cod in the waters surrounding the Lofoten Islands of northern Norway. Gillnets were used as part of the seasonal round by Swedish fishermen as well. Welsh and English fishermen gillnetted for Atlantic salmon in the rivers of Wales and England in coracles, using hand-made nets, for at least several centuries. These are but a few of the examples of historic gillnet fisheries around the world.

Gillnetting was an early fishing technology in colonial America, used for example, in fisheries for Atlantic salmon and shad. Immigrant fishermen from northern Europe and the Mediterranean brought a number of different adaptations of the technology from their respective homelands with them to the rapidly expanding salmon fisheries of the Columbia River from the 1860s onward. The boats used by these fisherman were typically around 25 feet (8 m) long and powered by oars. Many of these boats also had small sails and were called "row-sail" boats. At the beginning of the 1900s, steam powered ships would haul these smaller boats to their fishing grounds and retrieve them at the end of each day. However, at that time gas powered boats were beginning to make their appearance, and by the 1930s, the row-sail boat had virtually disappeared, except in Bristol Bay, Alaska, where motors were prohibited in the gillnet fishery by territorial law until 1951.

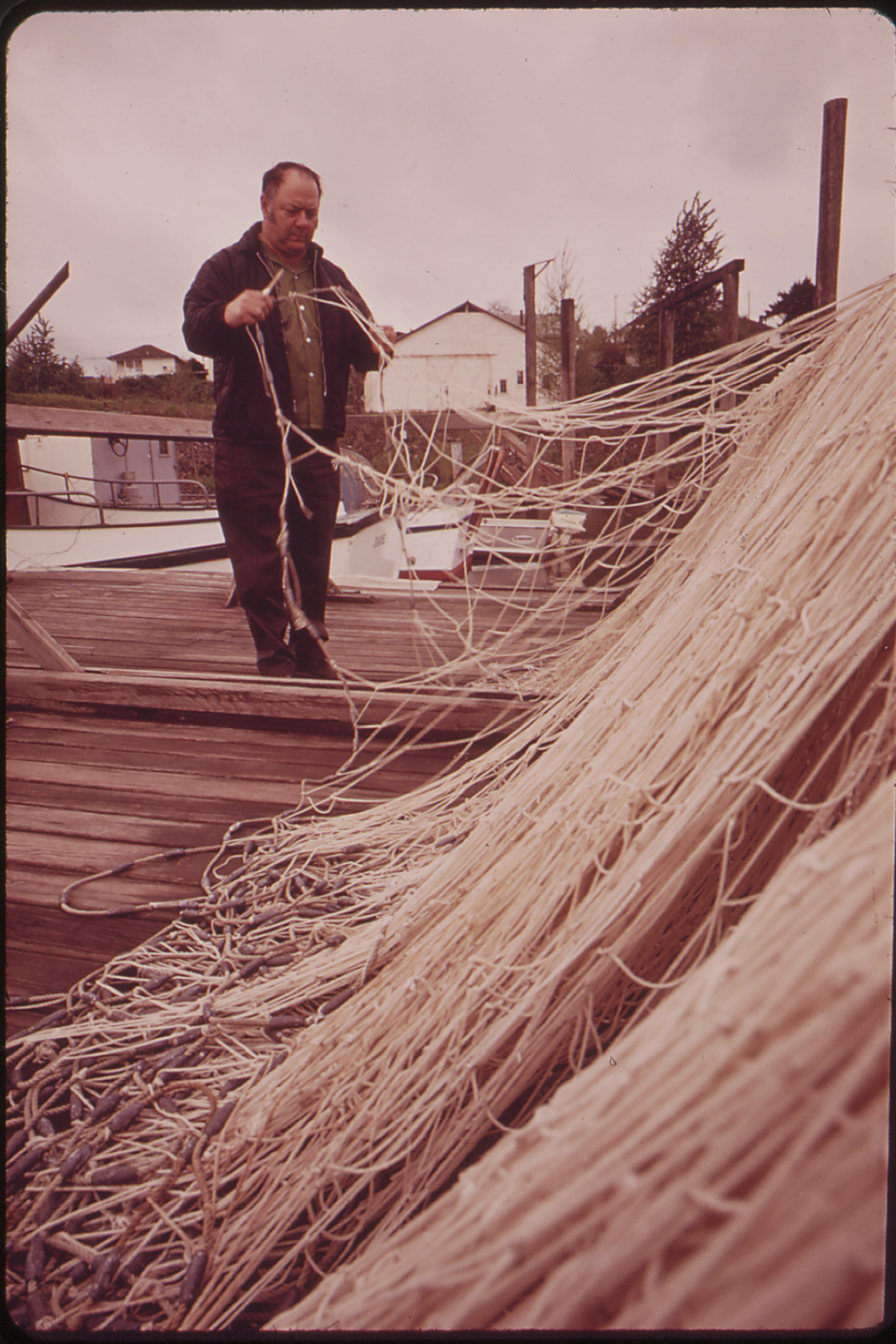
A fisherman repairs a gillnet (April 1973, St. Helens, Oregon)

In 1931, the first powered drum was created by Laurie Jarelainen. The drum is a circular device that is set to the side of the boat and draws in the nets. The powered drum allowed the nets to be drawn in much faster and along with the faster gas powered boats, fisherman were able to fish in areas they had previously been unable to go into, thereby revolutionizing the fishing industry.

During World War II, navigation and communication devices, as well as many other forms of maritime equipment (ex. depth-sounding and radar) were improved and made more compact. These devices became much more accessible to the average fisherman, thus making their range and mobility increasingly larger. It also served to make the industry much more competitive, as the fisherman were forced to invest more in boats and equipment to stay current with developing technology.

The introduction of fine synthetic fibres such as nylon in the construction of fishing gear during the 1960s marked an expansion in the commercial use of gillnets. The new materials were cheaper and easier to handle, lasted longer and required less maintenance than natural fibres. In addition, multifilament nylon, monofilament or multimonofilament fibres become almost invisible in water, so nets made with synthetic twines generally caught greater numbers of fish than natural fibre nets used in comparable situations.

Nylon is highly resistant to abrasion and degradation, hence the netting has the potential to last for many years if it is not recovered. This ghost fishing is of environmental concern. Attaching the gillnet floats with biodegradable material can reduce the problem. However it is difficult to generalize about the longevity of ghost-fishing gillnets due to the varying environments in which they are used. Some researchers have found gill-nets still catching fish and crustaceans over a year after loss, while others have found lost nets destroyed by wave action within one month or overgrown with seaweeds, increasing their visibility and reducing their catching potential to such an extent that they became a microhabitat used by small fish.

This type of net was heavily used by many Japanese, South Korean, and Taiwanese fishing fleets on the high seas in the 1980s to target tunas. Although highly selective with respect to size class of animals captured, gillnets are associated with high numbers of incidental captures of cetaceans (whales and dolphins). In the Sri Lankan gillnet fishery, one dolphin is caught for every 1.7–4.0 tonnes of tuna landed. This compares poorly with the rate of one dolphin per 70 tonnes of tuna landed in the eastern Pacific purse seine tuna fishery.

Many types of gillnets are used by fisheries scientists to monitor fish populations. Vertical gillnets are designed to allow scientists to determine the depth distribution of the captured fish.

== Legal status ==
United Nations General Assembly Resolution 46/215 called for the cessation of all "large-scale pelagic drift-net fishing" in international waters by the end of 1992. The laws of individual countries vary with regard to fishing in waters under their jurisdiction.

Possession of gillnets is illegal in some U.S. states and heavily regulated in others.

Oregon voters had the chance to decide on whether gillnetting will continue in the Columbia River in November 2012 by voting on Measure 81. The measure was defeated with 65% of Oregon voters voting against the measure and allowing commercial gillnet fishing to continue on the Columbia River.

The Columbia River Basin is currently under a management agreement that spans from 2008 to December 31, 2017. This management agreement looks to gather information on fish harvesting through means including gillnets. The parties involved will convene again to decide on further action after the current agreement ends.

The gill-netting season in Minnesota can vary from county to county and the net types used are regulated on a lake by lake basis by the Minnesota Department of Natural Resources.

Virginia's gill-netting season is regulated by the Virginia Marine Resources Commission. During different months of the year, certain rivers have restricted mesh sizes, which vary by location.

There have been proposed regulations to shut down drift gillnet fisheries whose by-catch numbers (which include dolphins, sea turtles and other marine life) were too high. In 2014, California lawmakers pushed for the banning of gillnet fishing through letters to federal fishing companies. The progress for these regulations have been paused in California mid 2017.

According to the High Seas Fishing Compliance Act from 1996, a permit is require for all commercial fishing vessels that are registered in the United States and under this act, vessels must have a record of all their fishing efforts on the high seas.

As of November 2017, there has been a bill introduced to improve the management of driftnets, with gillnets being under the umbrella of this fishing tool. The bill's focus is to ban the use of large-scale nets while supporting the use of alternative methods of fishing to decrease the maximum amount of bycatch. There is also a compensation plan proposed in the bill for fishery participants who stop using large-scale nets.

== Selectivity ==
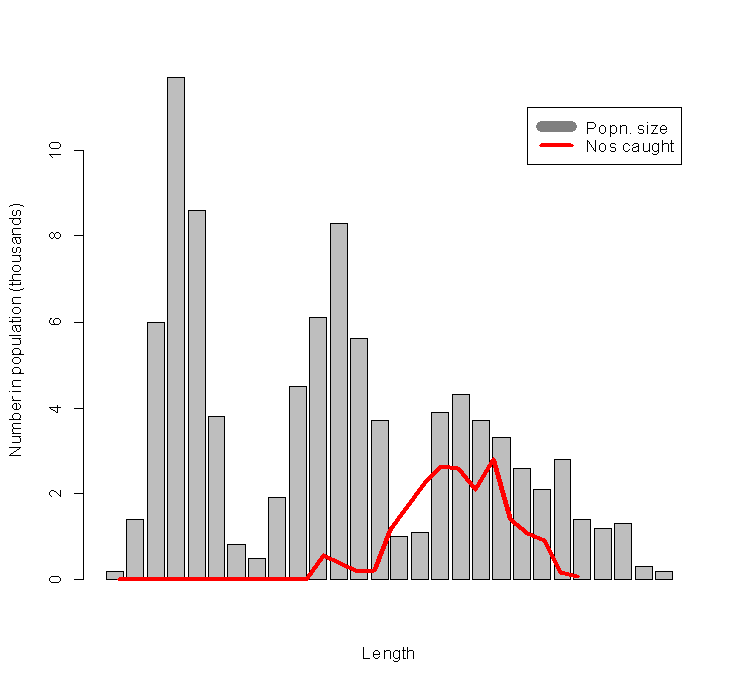
Selectivity properties of a gillnet on a hypothetical population

Gillnets are a series of panels of meshes with a weighted "foot rope" along the bottom, and a headline, to which floats are attached. By altering the ratio of floats to weights, buoyancy changes, and the net can therefore be set to fish at any depth in the water column. In commercial fisheries, the meshes of a gillnet are uniform in size and shape. Fish smaller than the mesh of the net pass through unhindered, while those too large to push their heads through the meshes as far as their gills are not retained. This gives gillnets the ability to target a specific size of fish, unlike other net gears such as trawls, in which smaller fish pass through the meshes and all larger fish are captured in the net.

=== Salmon ===
Commercial gillnet fisheries are still an important method of harvesting salmon in Alaska, British Columbia, Washington, and Oregon. In the lower Columbia River, non-Indian commercial salmon fisheries for spring Chinook have developed methods of selectively harvesting adipose fin clipped hatchery salmon using small mesh gillnets known as tangle nets or tooth nets. Non-adipose fin clipped fish (primarily natural origin salmon) must be released. Fishery management agencies estimate a relatively low release mortality rate on salmon and steelhead released from these small mesh gillnets.

Problems that can arise from selective harvesting are smaller reproducing adult fish, as well as the unexpected mortality of the fish which sustain injuries from the gillnet but are not retained in the fishery. Most salmon populations include several age classes, allowing for fish of different ages, and sizes, to reproduce with each other. A recent 2009 study looked at 59 years of catch and escapement data of Bristol Bay sockeye salmon to determine age and size at maturity trends attributable to the selectivity of commercial gillnet harvests. The study found that the larger females (>550 mm) of all age classes were most susceptible to harvest. The study suggests that smaller, younger fish were more likely to successfully traverse the gillnet fishery and reproduce than the larger fish. The study also found that the average length of sockeye harvested from 1946 to 2005 was 8 mm larger than the sockeye who escaped the gillnet fishery to spawn, reducing the fecundity of the average female by 5%, or 104 eggs. If a salmon enters a gillnet, but manages to escape, it can sustain injuries. These injuries can lead to a lower degree of reproductive success. A study aimed at quantifying mortality of Bristol Bay sockeye salmon due to gillnet-related injuries found that 11–29% of sockeye sustained fishery-related injuries attributable to gillnets, and 51% of those fish were expected to not reproduce.

Gillnets are sometimes a controversial gear type especially among sport fishers who argue they are inappropriate especially for salmon fisheries. These arguments are often related to allocation issues between commercial and recreational (sport) fisheries and not conservation issues. Most salmon fisheries, especially those targeting Pacific salmon in North America, are strictly managed to minimize total impacts to specific populations and salmon fishery managers continue to allow the use of gillnets in these fisheries.

=== Swordfish ===
Gillnets are also used out in the deep sea for fisheries whose primary catch is swordfish. California driftnet fisheries have some of the highest rates of by-catch with 12 percent of the catch being the targeted swordfish while up to 68 percent of the catch being by-catch that will be tossed back to sea.

=== Alternatives ===
Given the selective properties of gillnet fishing, alternative methods of harvest are currently being studied. Recent WDF&W reports suggest that purse seine is the most productive method with having highest catch per unit effort (CPUE), but has little information on the effectiveness of selectively harvesting hatchery-reared salmon. More conclusive research has been conducted jointly between the Confederated Tribes of the Colville Reservation and Bonneville Power Administration on a 10-year study on selective harvest methods of hatchery origin salmon in the Upper Columbia River by purse seine and tangle net. Their 2009 and 2010 findings show that purse seines have a higher percentage of survivability and higher CPUE than does tangle nets. A Colville Tribe biologist reports that during these two years the tribe harvested 3,163 hatchery Chinook while releasing 2,346 wild Chinook with only 1.4% direct or immediate mortality using purse seines, whereas the tangle net was far less productive but had an approximate 12.5% mortality. Researchers commented that the use of recovery boxes and shortened periods between checking the nets would have likely decreased mortality rates. While there is data that shows success of selective methods of harvest at protecting wild and ESA listed salmon, there still must be social acceptance of new methods of fishing.

There have also been studies done to see if differing strategies could potentially decrease the estimated 400,000 annual avian by-catch in coastal fisheries. These include three strategies that have a possible reduction in up to 75% of avian by-catch: gear modifications, where visual devices will be placed near the top of the net so birds will be able to see the nets; abundance-based fishery openings, where of birds will determine whether the nets will be set out or not; and time-of-day restrictions, which goes along with abundance- where bird by catch tended to occur at dawn and dusk, where as fish catch occurred mostly at dawn.

For marine mammal by-catch, field experiments have shown that the use of pingers on nets resulted in significantly lower numbers of by-catch than nets without pingers. After this study was completed by Jay Barlow, it was determined that there would be a 12-fold decrease in short-beaked common dolphins caught, a 4-fold decrease in other cetaceans and a 3-fold decrease in pinnipeds for nets containing pingers.

== Types of gillnets ==
The FAO classifies gillnet gear types as follows:

=== Set gillnets ===
Set gillnets consist of a single netting wall kept vertical by a floatline (upper line/headrope) and a weighted groundline (lower line/footrope). Small floats, usually shaped like eggs or cylinders and made of solid plastic, are evenly distributed along the floatline, while lead weights are evenly distributed along groundline. The lower line can also be made of lead cored rope, which does not need additional weight. The net is set on the bottom, or at a distance above it and held in place with anchors or weights on both ends. By adjusting the design these nets can fish in surface layers, in mid water or at the bottom, targeting pelagic, demersal or benthic species. On small boats gillnets are handled by hand. Larger boats use hydraulic net haulers or net drums. Set gillnets are widely used all over the world, and are employed both in inland and sea waters. They are popular with artisanal fisheries because no specialized gear is needed, and it is low cost based on the relationship of fuel/fish.

=== Encircling gillnets ===
Encircling gillnets are gillnets set vertically in shallow water, with the floatline remaining at the surface so they encircle fish. Small open boats or canoes can be used to set the net around the fish. Once the fish are encircled, the fishers shout and splash the water to panic the fish so they gill or entangle themselves. There is little negative impact on the environment. As soon as the gear is set the scaring takes place and the net is hauled back in. The fish are alive and discards can be returned to the sea. Encircling gillnets are commonly used by groups of small-scale fishers, and does not require other equipment.

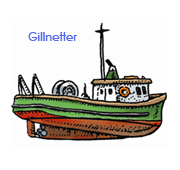
A gillnetter

=== Combined gillnets-trammel nets ===
This bottom-set gear has two parts:

- the upper part is a standard gillnet where semi-demersal or pelagic fish can be gilled
- the lower part is a trammel net where bottom fish can entangle.

The combined nets are maintained more or less vertically in the usual way by floats on the floatline and weights on the groundline. They are set on the bottom. After a time depending on the target species, they are hauled on board. Traditional combined nets were hauled by hand, especially on smaller boats. Recent hydraulic driven net haulers are now common. The gilled, entangled and enmeshed fish are removed from the net by hand. Of some concern with this method is ghost fishing by lost nets and bycatch of diving seabirds. Nets combined in this way were first used in the Mediterranean.

=== Drift nets ===
A drift net consists of one or more panels of webbing fastened together. They are left free to drift with the current, usually near the surface or not far below it. Floats on the floatline and weights on the groundline keep them vertical. Drift nets drift with the current while they are connected with the operating vessel, the driftnetter or drifter.

Drift nets are usually used to catch schooling forage fish such as herring and sardines, and also larger pelagic fish such as tuna, salmon and pelagic squid. Net haulers are usually used to set and haul driftnets, with a drifter capstan on the forepart of the vessel. In developing countries most nets are hauled by hand. The mesh size of the gillnets is very effective at selecting or regulating the size of fish caught. The drift net has a low fuel/fish energy consumption compared to other fishing gear. However, the issue of concern with this type of net is the bycatch of species that are not targeted, such as marine mammals, seabirds and to a minor extent turtles. The use of drift nets longer than 2.5 kilometres on the high seas was banned by the United Nations in 1991. Prior to this ban, drift nets were reaching lengths of 60 kilometres. However, there are still serious concerns with ongoing violations.

=== Gillnets and entangling nets ===
The tangle net, or tooth net, originated in British Columbia, Canada, as a gear specifically developed for selective fisheries. Tangle nets have smaller mesh sizes than standard gillnets. They are designed to catch fish by their nose or jaw, enabling bycatch to be resuscitated and released unharmed. Tangle nets as adapted to the mark-selective fishery for spring Chinook salmon on the lower Columbia River have a standard mesh size of 4 1/4 inches (11 cm). Short net lengths and soak times are used in an effort to land fish in good condition. Tangle nets are typically used in situations where the release of certain (usually wild) fish unharmed is desirable. In a typical situation calling for the use of a tangle net, for instance, all fish retaining their adipose fins (usually wild) must be returned to the water. Tangle nets are used in conjunction with a live recovery box, which acts as a resuscitation chamber for unmarked fish that appear lethargic or stressed before their release into the water.

== Historical images ==
Salmon gillnetting

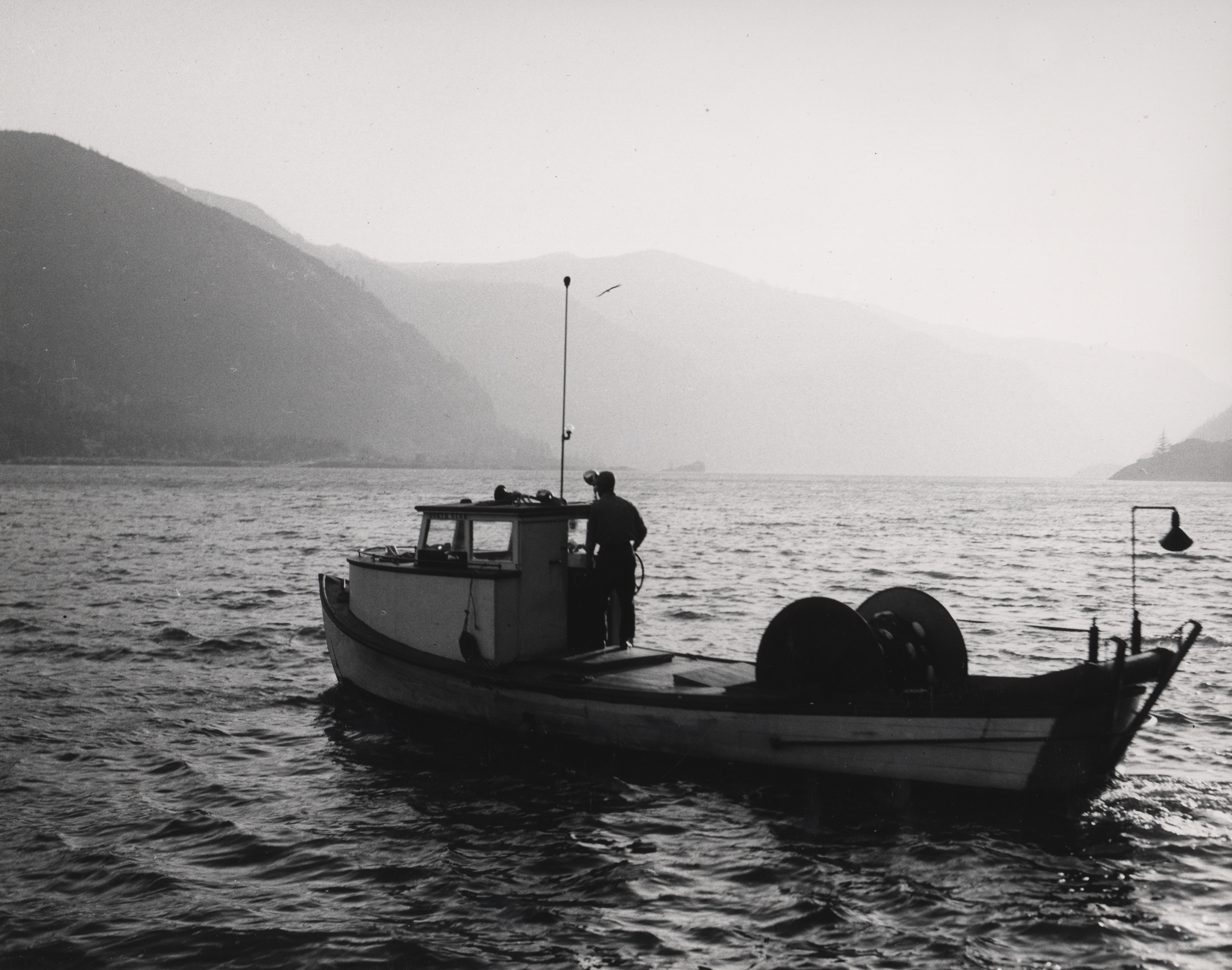
Salmon gillnet boat with drum

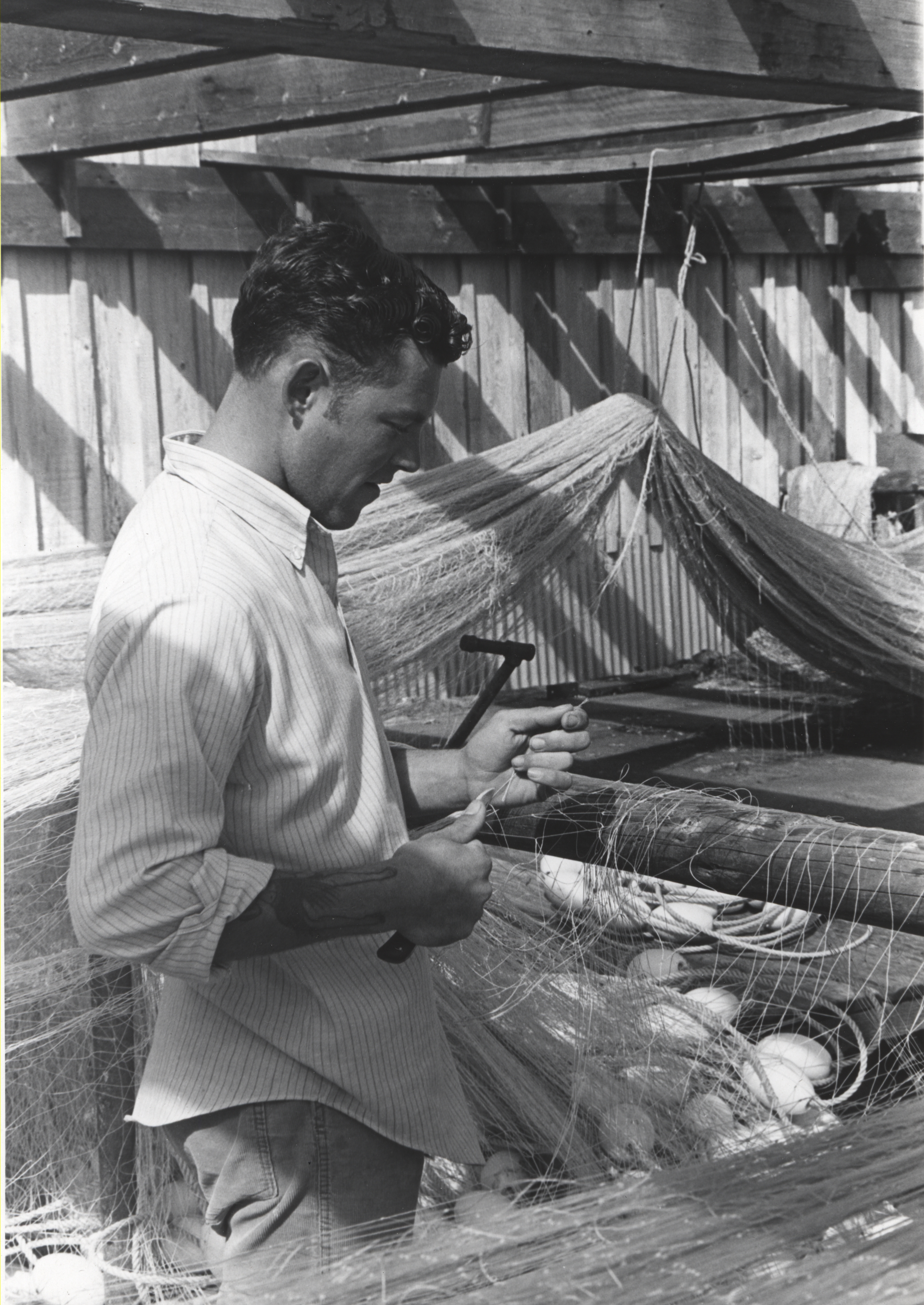
Repairing salmon gillnet

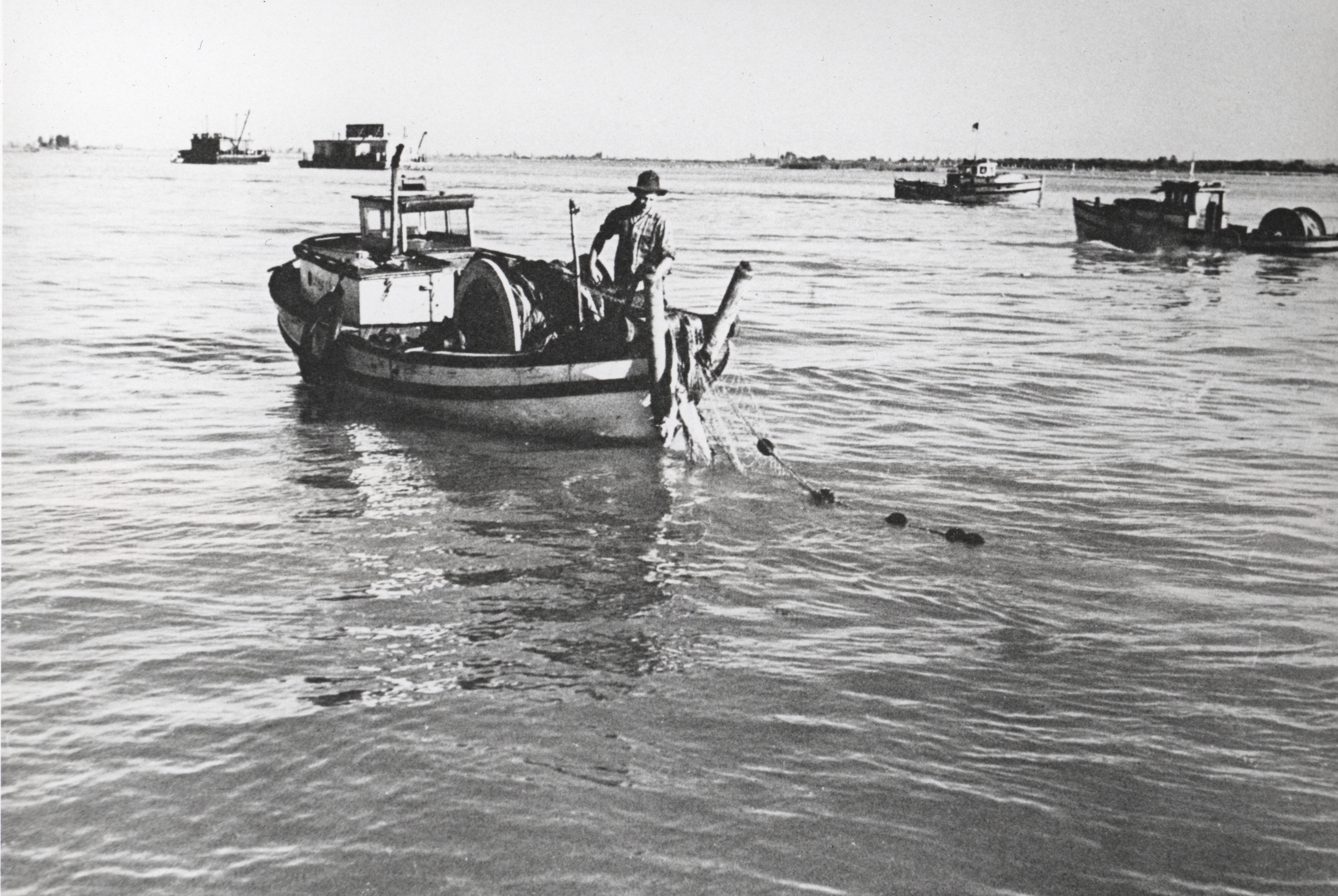
Hauling the gillnet over the power-driven drum

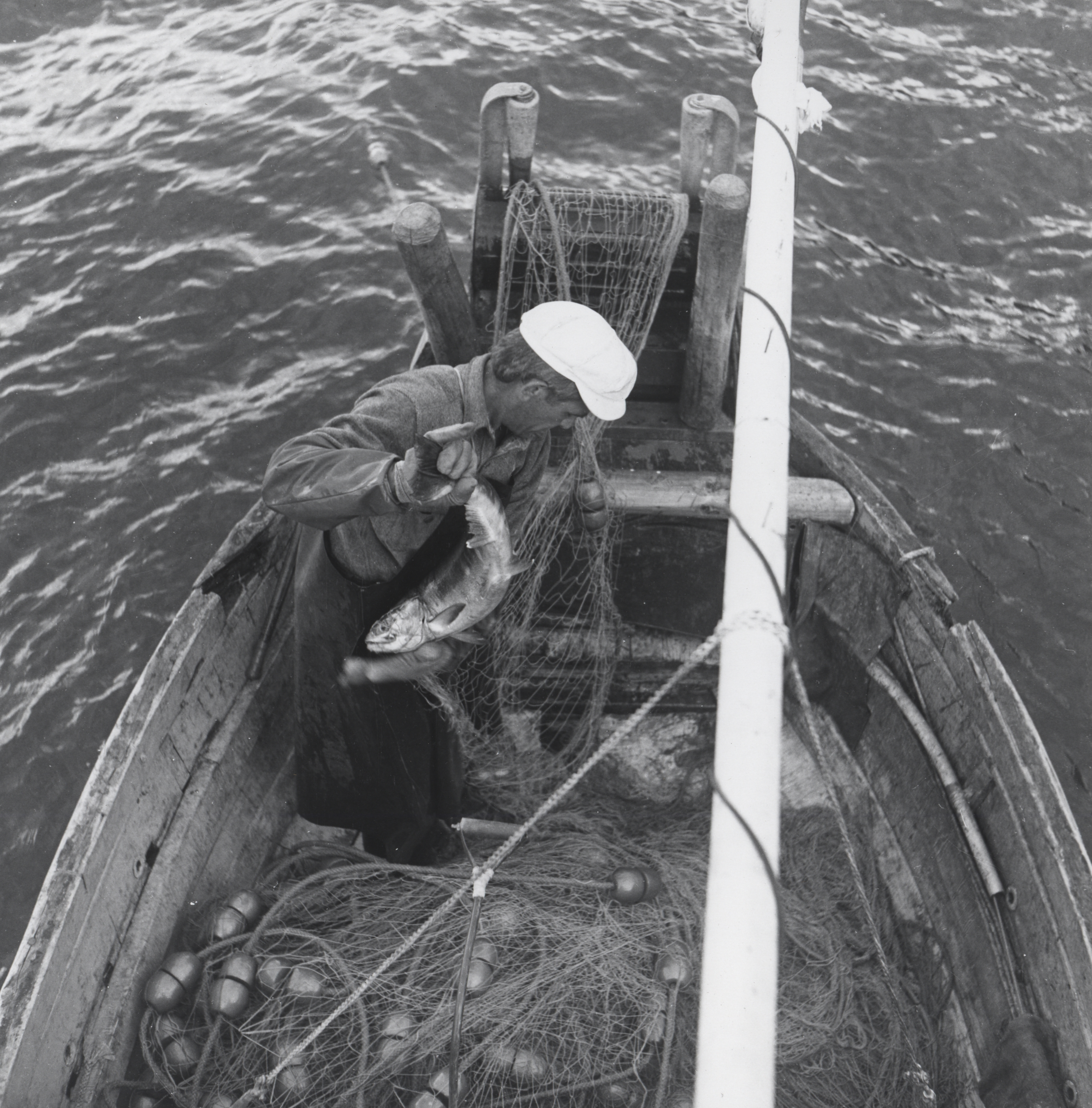
Removing salmon from the gillnet
