= Cadec-online.com =

cadec-online.com
- Screenshot of cadec-online.com's homepage.
- Website type: Cloud computing
- Available in: English, Spanish, Portuguese, Persian
- Headquarters: Morgantown, West Virginia
- Creator: Ever J. Barbero
- Website: cadec-online.com
- Registration: Required
- Launched: February 9, 2011; 15 years ago
- Current status: Inactive
- Content licence: Terms and Conditions
- Written in: ASP.NET, C#, Fortran

cadec-online.com was a multilingual web application that performs analysis of composite materials and is used primarily for teaching, especially within the disciplines of aerospace engineering, materials science, naval engineering, mechanical engineering, and civil engineering. Users navigate the application through a tree view which structures the component chapters. cadec-online is an engineering cloud application. It uses the LaTeX library to render equations and symbols, then Sprites to optimize the delivery of images to the page. As of 2021, the application is no longer available.

== Chapters ==
=== Micromechanics ===
cadec-online.com implements micromechanics for composites reinforced with unidirectional fibers, and random fibers, as well as plain weave, twill, and satin textiles. It predicts lamina elastic moduli, strength values, coefficient of thermal expansion (CTE), moisture expansion, and other micromechanical properties. The application conducts this analysis through several theoretical models, including:

- Cylindrical assemblage
- Halpin-Tsai
- Periodic microstructure model (PMM)
- Rule of mixtures (ROM, Woldemar Voigt (1887)) and the inverse ROM (A. Reuss (1929))
- Stress partitioning

=== Lamina analysis ===
cadec-online.com can calculate the three-dimensional (3D) stiffness and compliance matrices, the two-dimensional (2D) reduced stiffness and compliance matrices, in lamina coordinate system (cs). It is also capable of transforming the composite laminates matrices to any other coordinate system. Lamina types supported by the software include:

- Unidirectional. The lamina properties are calculated using micromechanics.
- Random, continuous/chopped strand mat. The lamina properties are calculated using micromechanics.
- Fabric/textile. The lamina properties are calculated using micromechanics.
- Experimental. The lamina properties are given by the user, based on testing or material supplier data.

=== Laminate analysis ===
The application can carry out laminate analyses including calculation of laminate stiffness, stress, strain, and failure. The software supports intact and damaged laminates (see damage mechanics). For each category, cadec-online.com can calculate the laminate thermal stresses, laminate coefficient of thermal expansion, laminate stiffness and compliance matrices for composite laminates. Also, the application can predict the laminate moduli, which are orthotropic material equivalents for the stiffness of the laminate in both bending and membrane modes of deformation.

=== Failure analysis ===
cadec-online.com predicts failures such as first ply failure (FPF) and last ply failure (LPF) under mechanical, thermal, and moisture loads, as well as in situ effects, using several failure criteria (FC) including:

- Maximum strain
- Maximum stress
- Interacting FC
- Hashin FC
- Puck FC
- Truncated Maximum Strain

=== Damage Mechanics ===
Uses discrete damage mechanics (DDM) to predict crack density vs. strain for any symmetric laminate subjected to any membrane state of strain. The results can be exported to Excel for plotting. The state variable describing the damage state of the material is the crack density in each ply. The thermodynamic force is the midsurface strain applied to the laminate. The relevant material properties are the fracture toughnesses in modes I (opening) and II (shear) of the ply.

=== Textile reinforced composite analysis ===
The application can predict the stiffness and strength of composite materials reinforced with plain weave, twill, and satin textile, also called fabric. The textile lamina is idealized as a transversely isotropic material. The calculated textile lamina can be used as any other lamina in the rest of the application. The calculated properties include:

- Five elastic moduli
- Seven strength values
- Two coefficients of thermal expansion (CTE)
- Two coefficients of moisture expansion (CME, see Hygroscopy)

=== Thin walled beam analysis ===
The application is able to analyze laminated composite thin walled beams with general cross sections. Beams can be asymmetric and loaded by general combinations of forces in three planes (axial, vertical and horizontal) as well as by three moments (torque and two bending moments). cadec-online.com computes section properties such as the shear center.

== Mechanical and environmental loads ==
cadec-online.com defines four different types of loads:

- Laminate loads, which are membrane, bending, and transverse shear stress resultants.
- Simultaneously, laminates can be subjected to the environment, represented by temperature and moisture.
- Thin walled beams can be subjected by beam loads, i.e., three forces (axial, vertical and horizontal), and three moments (torque and two bending moments).

== Application programming interface ==
cadec-online.com features an API that allows users to access virtually all of the capabilities present in the web version of the software from other software environments such as Abaqus, Ansys, Matlab, Python, .NET Framework, Mathematica, etc.
