= Multifilament fishing line =

Braided line which is made of a type of polyethylene

Multifilament line, also referred to as The Super Lines, is a type of fishing line. It is a braided line which is made up of ultra-high-molecular-weight polyethylene (UHMWPE), a specialty polyethylene polymer that makes an extremely thin line for its strength. By weight, UHMWPE strands are five to ten times sturdier than steel. Multifilament line is similar to braided dacron in terms of sensitivity but a diameter about one-third that of the ubiquitous nylon monofilament line.

Multifilament works best on conventional and baitcasting reels. On spinning and spincasting reels, the line's limpness can make sure for awkward manipulation, as it does not "spring" off the reel like monofilament. Consequently, knot-tying is more difficult with multifilaments. Certain knots work better with superline, like the palomar knot. Applying a type of super glue will help to prevent other types of knots from slipping.

This type of fishing line is expensive, sometimes four times the cost of equivalent monofilament. This can become a considerable expense, especially considering that the line is so thin that one needs more of it to fill a reel spool. Sometimes, a backing of monofilament or other line is used under the braided line on the spool.

== See also ==
- Braided fishing line
- Ultra high molecular weight polyethylene
