= Furled leader =

Fly fishing leader

A furled leader (also known as twined leader) is a type of knotless tapered fly fishing leader. It is known for high performance, low memory, and soft artificial fly presentation when casting. These attributes are due to the way these leaders are constructed which is similar to creating rope. The big difference is that furled leaders are created with a taper. The twisted style of construction and being made from many filaments leads to a flexible leader with low to no memory like a section of rope.

== Construction ==
Furled leaders are created from braided line, monofilament, fluorocarbon fishing line, fly tying thread or other thread, or silk. This material is laid out on a jig in a series of interlocking loops, thereby creating the taper of the leader. It is made in two, sometimes three or even more, legs; more legs will result in a smoother, rounder finished leader.

Depending on whether they are constructed separately or as a set of interconnected legs from a continuous thread, legs are then twisted while under tension independently, or simultaneously, in the same spinning direction. The legs are combined and allowed to untwist under weight or tension. As the legs untwist, they furl together to create the final structure. Furled leaders can also be constructed using an approach resembling rope laying, in which the legs are twisted simultaneously, under tension, while separated by a 'top', attached to a runner that can rotate. In this approach, the twisted legs 'below' the top will start furling under tension, moving the top up to the furling end. This creates a full furled leader in one continuous process.

The ends of the leader are then finished to hold the leader's furl - the butt end is most often finished with a so-called Shorb loop. The tippet end can be finished with a Shorb loop, a knotted loop, or a micro tippet ring. The leader is attached to the end of the fly line, usually with a loop-to-loop connection, and a simple or stepped-down tippet is attached to the thin end before use.
