= Halpin–Tsai model =

Mathematical model of elasticity

The Halpin–Tsai model is a mathematical model for the prediction of elasticity of composite material based on the geometry and orientation of the filler and the elastic properties of the filler and matrix. The model is based on the self-consistent field method although often consider to be empirical.

== See also ==
- Cadec-online.com implements the Halpin–Tsai model among others.
