= Fishing line =

String or line intended for angling

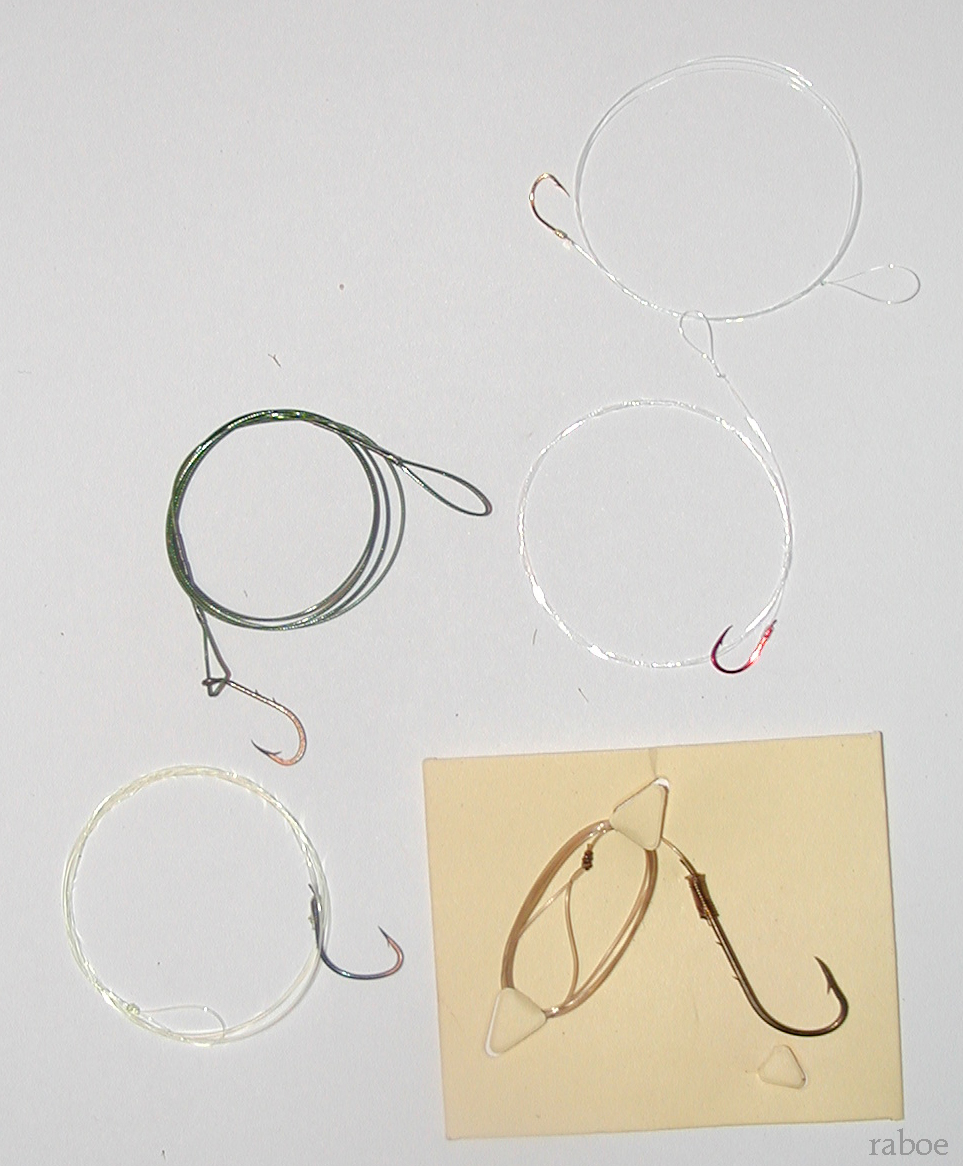
Fishing line with hooks attached

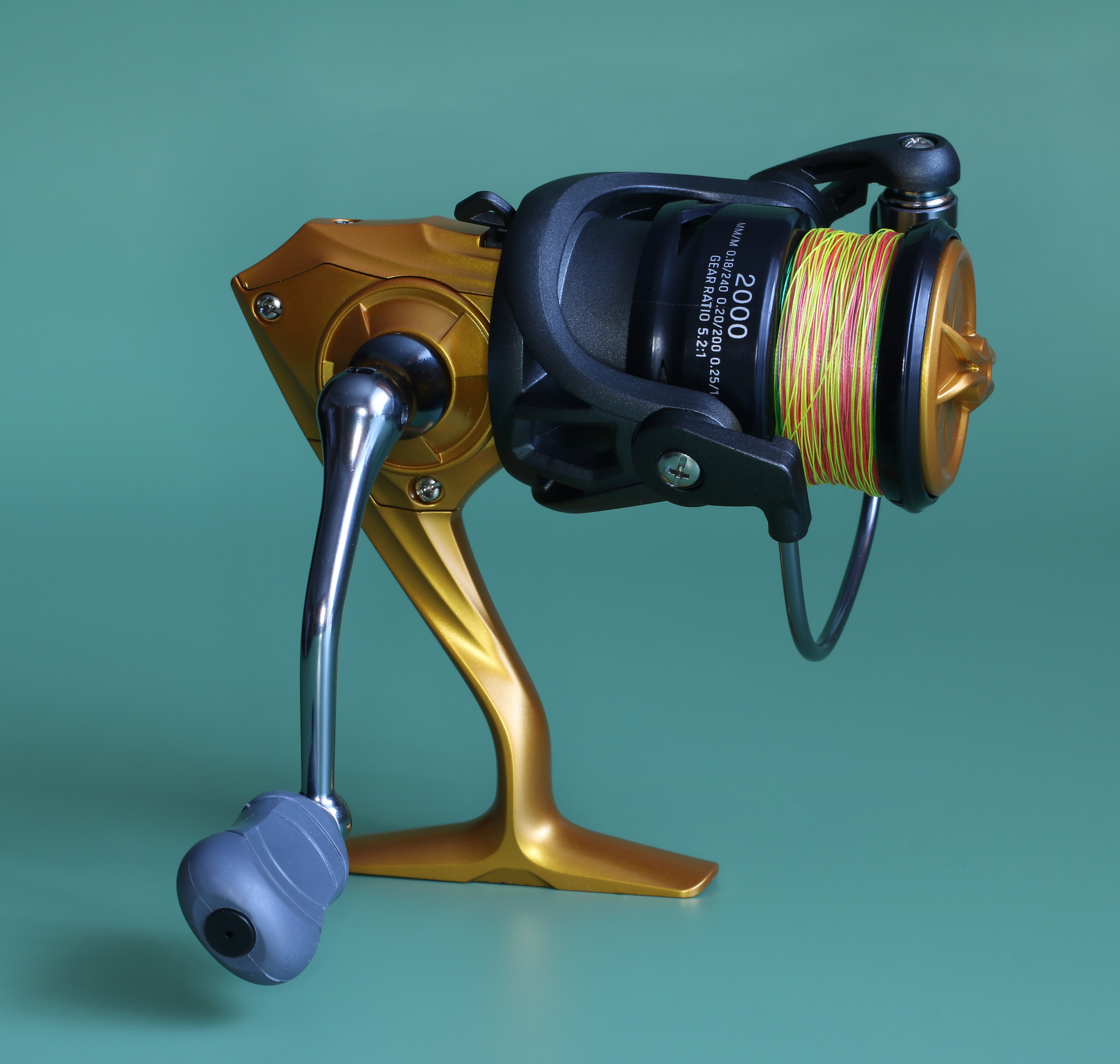
Multi-colored fishing line on a spinning reel

A fishing line is any flexible, high-tensile cord used in angling to tether and pull in fish, in conjunction with at least one hook. Fishing lines are usually pulled by and stored in a reel, but can also be retrieved by hand, with a fixed attachment to the end of a rod, or via a motorized trolling outrigger.

Fishing lines generally resemble a long, ultra-thin rope, with important attributes including length, thickness, material, and build. Other factors relevant to certain fishing practices include breaking strength, knot strength, UV resistance, castability, limpness, stretch, memory, abrasion resistance, and visibility. Traditional fishing lines are made of silk, while most modern lines are made from synthetic polymers such as nylon, polyethylene, or polyvinylidene fluoride ("fluorocarbon") and may come in monofilament or braided (multifilament) forms.

== Terminology ==
Fishing with a hook-and-line setup is called angling. Fish are caught when one is drawn by the bait/lure dressed on the hook into swallowing it in whole, causing in the hook (usually barbed) piercing the soft tissues and anchoring into the mouthparts, gullet or gill, resulting in the fish becoming firmly tethered to the line. Another more primitive method is to use a straight gorge, which is buried longitudinally in the bait such that it would be swallowed end first, and the tension along the line would fix it cross-wise in the fish's stomach or gullet and so the capture would be assured. Once the fish is hooked, the line can then pull it towards the angler and eventually fetch it out of the water (known as "landing" the fish). Heavier fish can be difficult to retrieve by only dragging the line (as it might overwhelm and snap the line) and might need to be landed via additionally using a hand net (a.k.a. landing net) or a hooked pole called a gaff.

Trolling is a technique where one or more lines, each with at least one hooked fishing lure at the end, is dragged through the water, which mimick schooling forage fish. Trolling from a moving boat is used in both big-game and commercial fishing as a method of catching large open-water species such as tuna and marlin (which are instinctively drawn to schoolers), and can also be used when angling in freshwater as a way to catch salmon, northern pike, muskellunge and walleye. The technique allows anglers to cover a large body of water in a short time without having to cast and retrieve lures constantly.

Longline fishing and trotlining are commercial fishing technique that uses many secondary lines with baited hooks hanging perpendicularly from a single main line.

Snagging is a fishing technique where a large, sharp grappling hook is used to pierce the fish externally in the body instead of inside the fish's mouth, and is therefore not the same as angling. Generally, a large open-gaped treble hook with a heavy sinker is cast into a river containing a large amount of fish (such as salmon) and is quickly jerked and reeled in, which gives the snag hook a gaff-like "clawing" motion that can spear its sharp points past the scales and skin and deep into the body. Modern technologies such as underwater cameras are sometimes used to help improve the timing of snagging. Due to the mutilating nature of this technique (where the fish are typically too deeply injured to be released alive), snagging is frequently deemed an unethical and illegal method, and some snagging practitioners have added procedures to disguise the snagging practice, such as adding baits or jerking the line using a fishing rod, to make it look like angling.

=== Sections ===
Traditionally, only a single thread of line is used to connect the hook with the rod and reel. However, most modern angling setups use at least two sections of line (typically the mainline and the leader) joined with a bend knot (such as the famously named fisherman's knot). Occasionally a swivel might be used to join the lines and reduce the bait/lure spinning due to the inherent line twisting from a fixed-spool reel.

A typical modern angling setup can include the following line sections:

- Backing is the rearmost section of the fishing line and typically used only to "pad up" the spool of the fishing reel, in order to prevent unwanted slippage between the mainline and the (usually metallic and well polished) spool surface, increase the effective radius of the spooled line and hence the retrieval speed (i.e. inches per turn), and to shorten the "jump" distance during line release in spinning reels. The backing can also act as a line reserve in case a powerful fish that manages to overpower the drag mechanism of the reel and stretch out the entire length of the mainline.
- Mainline is the main section of the fishing line, and the portion that primarily interacts with the rod, line guides and reel. This is the section that handles most of the tensile stress when retrieving the line.
- Leader is the frontmost section of the fishing line that is attached to the hook/lure, and the portion that most likely will be in actual physical contact with the fish. Many larger, feistier target fish warrants a strong mainline, which might make it too thick to thread through the eye of the hook, thus necessitating a thinner line to "lead" into the hook (hence the name). Leader lines usually use high-specific strength material with clear colors and water-like refractive indices (thus harder for the fish to spot it) such as polyvinylidene fluoride (PVDF, commonly called "fluorocarbon"), or even stainless steel/titanium wires to reduce breakage due to abrasion damage or fish biting. The leader line can also serve as a sacrificial device, as having a leader rated at a designated breaking strength less than that of the rod and mainline helps to cap the transferred stress and protect those more costly gears/tackles from overloading and breaking (similar to how a fuse protects circuitry), which will minimize loss and cost of repairs/replacements if the fish manages to overpower the angler's gear setup.
- Tippet or trace is used occasionally in fly fishing, and serves as a secondary leader that thread to the much smaller and delicate fly hooks.

== History ==
=== Early lines ===
Leonard Mascall, in his book from 1596 titled "A Booke of fishing with Hooke and Line, and of all other instruments thereunto belonging". followed in many ways after Dame Juliana Berners, has an excerpt establishing silk worms in the area of England at that time:

..."In May, take the stone flye or Caddis worme, and the bobbe worme vnder the Cowtorde: also ye may take the silke worme, and the baite that breedeth on a Fearne leafe." ...

And another excerpt explaining compiling a silk leader-line for a catgut fly-line.

"...whippe it so faire as yee shall see good, then next your hooke at the bought put throw your silke or haire in going round about the hooke three times, then plucke first your silke or haire..."

So back then there was silk and horse hair used for angling.

As written in 1667 by Samuel Pepys, the fishing lines in his time were made from catgut. Later, silk fishing lines were used around 1724.

=== Modern lines ===
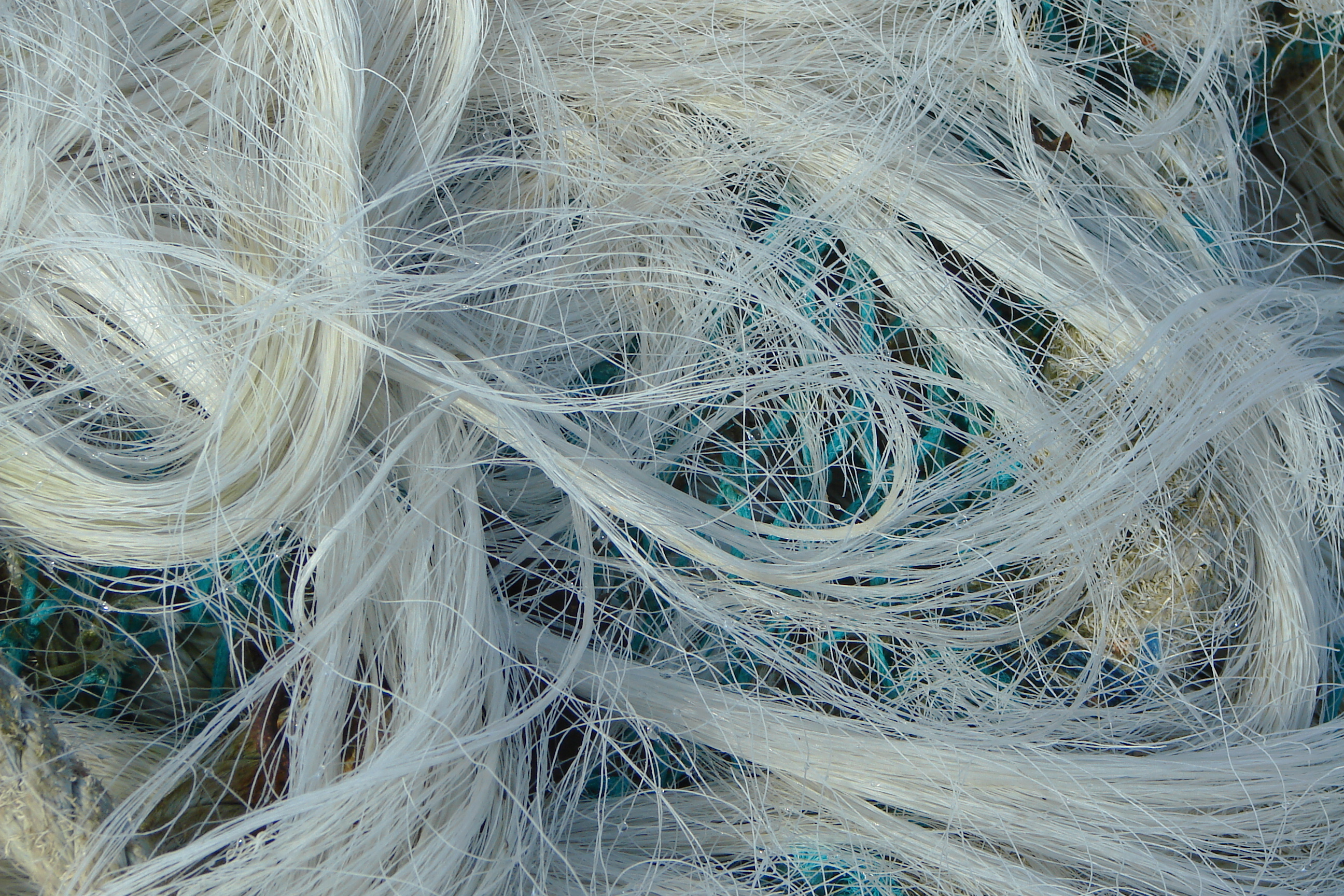
Fishing line

Modern fishing lines intended for spinning, spin cast, or bait casting reels are almost entirely made from artificial substances, including nylon (typically 610 or 612), polyvinylidene fluoride (PVDF, also called fluorocarbon), polyethylene, Dacron and UHMWPE (Honeywell's Spectra or Dyneema). The most common type is monofilament, made of a single strand. Fishermen often use monofilament because of its buoyant characteristics and its ability to stretch under load. The line stretch has advantages, such as damping the force when setting the hook and when fighting strong fish. On very far distances the damping may become a disadvantage. Recently, other alternatives to standard nylon monofilament lines have been introduced made of copolymers or fluorocarbon, or a combination of the two materials. Fluorocarbon fishing line is made of the fluoropolymer PVDF and it is valued for its refractive index, which is similar to that of water, making it less visible to fish. Fluorocarbon is also a denser material, and therefore, is not nearly as buoyant as monofilament. Anglers often utilize fluorocarbon when they need their baits to stay closer to the bottom without the use of heavy sinkers. There are also braided fishing lines, cofilament and thermally fused lines, also known as "superlines" for their small diameter, lack of stretch, and great strength relative to standard nylon monofilament lines. Braided, thermally fused, and chemically fused varieties of "superlines" are now readily available.

==== Specialty lines ====
Fly lines consist of a tough braided or monofilament core, wrapped in a thick waterproof plastic sheath, often of polyvinyl chloride (PVC). In the case of floating fly lines, the PVC sheath is usually embedded with many "microballoons", or air bubbles, and may also be impregnated with silicone or other lubricants to give buoyancy and reduce wear. In order to fill up the reel spool and ensure an adequate reserve in case of a run by a powerful fish, fly lines are usually attached to a secondary line at the butt section, called backing. Fly line backing is usually composed of braided dacron or gelspun monofilaments. All fly lines are equipped with a leader of monofilament or fluorocarbon fishing line, usually (but not always) tapered in diameter, and referred to by the "X-size" (0X, 2X, 4X, etc.) of its final tip section, or tippet. Tippet size is usually between 0X and 8X, where 0X is the thickest diameter, and 8X is the thinnest. There are exceptions to this, and tippet sizes do exist outside of the 0X–8X parameter.

Tenkara lines are special lines used for the fixed-line fishing method of tenkara. Traditionally these are furled lines the same length as the tenkara rod. Although original to Japan, these lines are similar to the British tradition of furled leader. They consist of several strands being twisted together in decreasing numbers toward the tip of the line, thus creating a taper that allows the line to cast the fly. It serves the same purpose as the fly-line, to propel a fly forward. They may be tied of various materials, but most commonly are made of monofilament.

Wire lines are frequently used as leaders to prevent the fishing line from being severed by toothy fish. Usually braided from several metal strands, wire lines may be made of stainless steel, titanium, or a combination of metal alloys coated with plastic.

Stainless-steel line leaders provide:

- bite protection – it is extremely hard for fish to cut the steel wire, regardless of jaw and teeth strength and sharpness,
- abrasion resistance – sharp rocks and objects can damage other lines, while steel wire can cut through most of the materials,
- single-wire (single-strand) leaders are not as flexible as multi-strand steel wire, but are extremely strong and tough,
- multi-strand steel wire leaders are very flexible, but are somewhat more abrasive and more damage-prone than single-strand wires.

Titanium fishing leaders are actually titanium–nickel alloys that have several very important features:

- titanium leader lines are very flexible, regardless of whether they are single- or multi-strand lines/wires,
- these lines are very elastic – they can stretch up to 10% without permanent damage to the line itself – perfect for hook setting,
- these lines are knottable just as nylon monofilament lines,
- surface is rather hard and abrasion-resistant – great for fishing toothy fish,
- titanium wire is corrosion-resistant and can last for a long time, even surpassing stainless-steel wires,
- due to the strength and elasticity, titanium wires are almost entirely kink-proof.

Copper, monel and lead-core fishing lines are used as heavy trolling main lines, usually followed with fluorocarbon line near the lure or bait with fishing swivel between the lines. Due to their high density, these fishing lines sink rapidly in water and require less line for achieving desired trolling depth. On the other hand, these lines are relatively thick for desired strength, especially when compared with braided fishing lines and often require reels with larger spools.

== Environmental impact ==
Discarded monofilament fishing line takes up to 600 years to decompose. Abandoned lines can entangle fish, birds, turtles, and marine mammals, often leading to injury, starvation, or drowning. To address this problem, there have been several types of biodegradable fishing lines developed to minimize the impact on the environment. Additionally, to discourage anglers from discarding their fishing lines into the natural environment, there have been dedicated bins for old fishing lines, that have been installed on coastlines in various locations.

In Australia, TAngler is one of the organisations that installed more than 350 dedicated bins in key coastal locations in Victoria, NSW and Queensland since 2006, and more than 10 tonnes of discarded fishing line have been collected. Other bodies include Dolphin Marine Magic (DMM), with its "Seal the Loop" program, which originated in Melbourne Zoo in 2010. DMM has partnered with local councils to install dedicated bins in popular fishing locations, and by 2015, reached over 200 "Seal the Loop" bins across Australia.

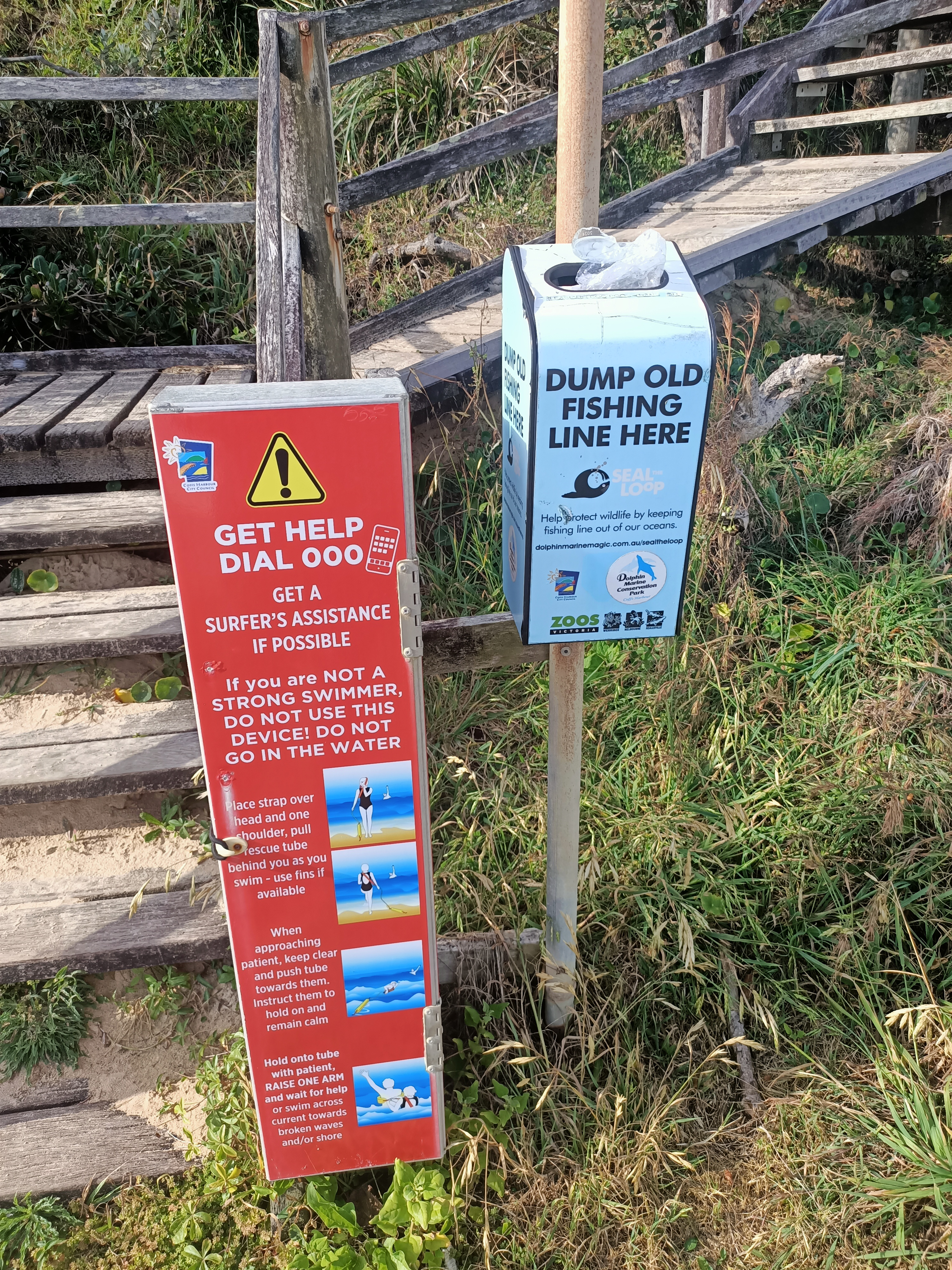
Dedicated fishing line disposal bin alongside a life-saving buoy station at Boambee Head Peninsula, Sawtell, New South Wales, Australia

== See also ==
- Ultra high molecular weight polyethylene
- Braided fishing line
- Fishing
- Fish hook
- Fluorocarbon
- Fly fishing
- Monofilament line
- Multifilament fishing line
