= Trilene knot =

Fishing knot

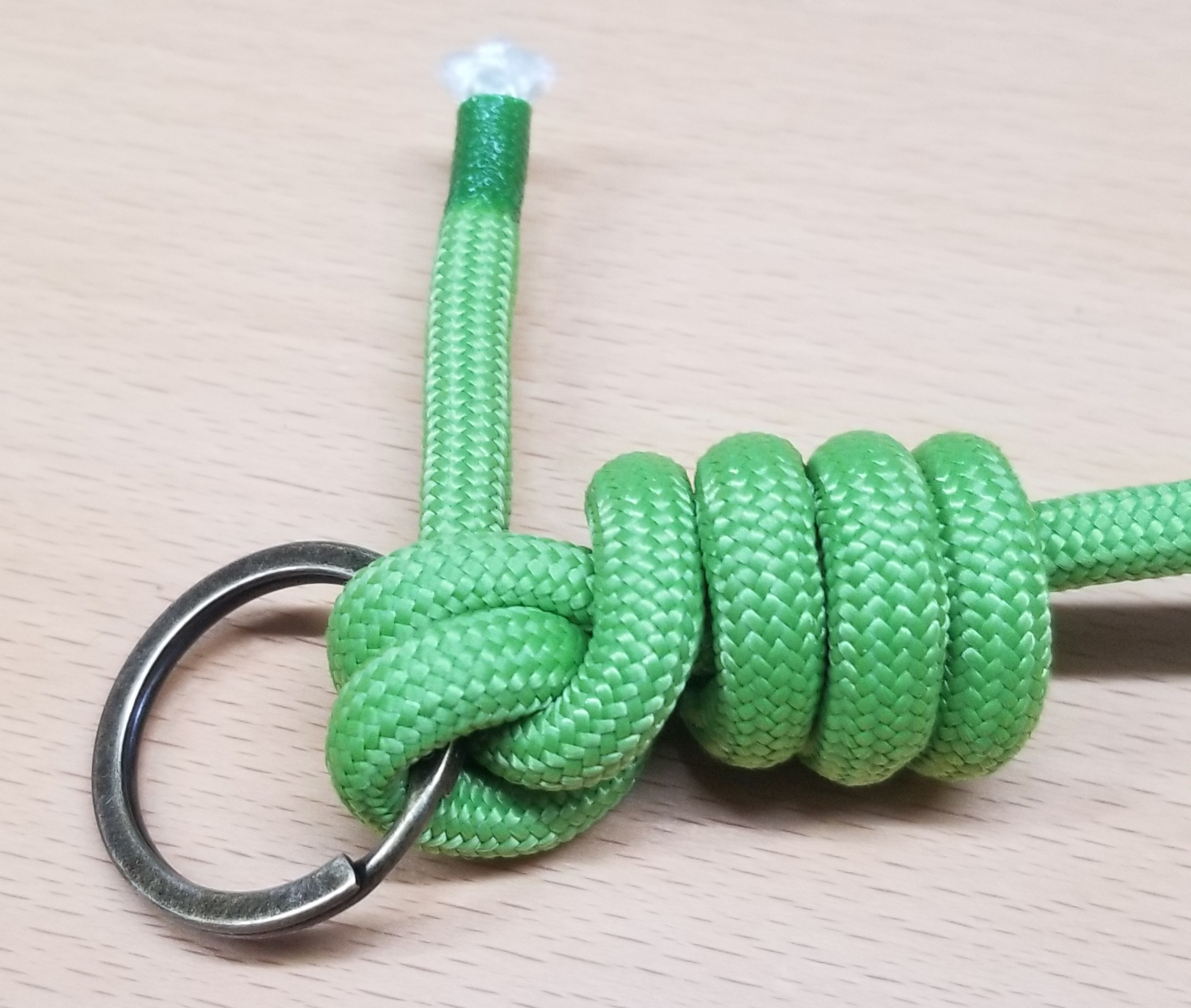
- Category: Hitch
- Efficiency: 85%
- Typical use: Attaching a fishing line to a hook or swivel

The Trilene knot /ˈtraɪliːn/ is a multipurpose fishing knot that can be used for attaching monofilament line to hooks, swivels and lures. It resists slippage and failures. The knot was apparently in use at least as early as 1975 when it was included in Tom McNally's Complete Book of Fishermen's Knots as the "double-looped clinch knot". However, professional anglers Jimmy Houston and Ricky Green would later claim that they invented the knot in the late 1970s while experimenting during promotional events for Trilene, a fishing line manufacturer. Both men favored the idea of naming the knot after themselves, though Trilene ultimately applied its own name instead. It is unclear whether Houston, Green or Trilene were aware of the knot's earlier invention or its prior inclusion in McNally's book.
