= Braided fishing line =

Type of fishing line

Braided line was one of the earliest types of fishing line, and in its modern incarnations it is still very popular in some situations because of its high knot strength, lack of stretch, and great overall power in relation to its diameter.

== Background ==
Braids were originally made from natural fibers such as cotton and linen, but natural fiber braids (with the very rare exception of braided silk) have long since been replaced by braided or woven fibers of synthetic materials like Dacron, Spectra or micro-dyneema into a strand of line. For these strands another term is used i.e. "carrier" as instance 8 strand braided fishing line is called an 8-carrier line.

The braided line is visible underwater as compared to other lines. Due to this line's thin diameter, it can cause scratches and cuts on the angler's hands. Braided fishing lines have a low resistance to abrasion, and sharp objects can easily cut braided lines. Their actual breaking strength will commonly well exceed their pound-test rating.

== Description ==
Braided lines often have 1/3 to 1/4 the diameter of mono or fluorocarbon lines at a given test breaking strength. Therefore, it is easy to fit much longer braided line on a spool than monofilament or fluorocarbon line for the same strength. This is very important for deep sea fishing, since reels don't have to be very big to accommodate long lines. Also, thin braided lines provide less resistance to sea currents.

Braided lines have very little stretch, making fishing rigs very sensitive to fish bites; This is very important for both deep sea fishing and when targeting fish with a gentle bite. Due to the minimal stretch of braided line, hard-hitting fish will frequently cause the line to break. Thus it is very important to set the drag on reels on very low values. Braided fishing lines are very flexible and can be easier to cast long distances. Braided line typically floats, and as such, is a common choice for topwater rigs, etc.

One drawback of braided lines is that they are highly visible in the water, and thus visible to fish. Hence, it is common to attach a monofilament or fluorocarbon line to the end of the braided fishing line to serve as a leader and to reduce the high visibility of the braided fishing line.

When cutting braided line to tie new lures, it is best to use a sharp pair of scissors rather than a nail clipper. The clipper will leave frayed ends because of the multi-stranded braided line. A clean cut is possible with sharp scissors.

Due to their flexibility, lack of stretch and most important, slippery surface, braided lines are hard to knot properly. There are several knots that can be used with braided lines: Double Uni Knot or Uni to Uni Knot, Double Palomar knot, Berkley Braid Knot, San Diego Jam Knot, Trilene knot, Alberto knot etc. It is very important to tie the knots very carefully.

Braided lines, particularly the newer synthetics, can be successfully used on any type of fishing reel, but are perhaps most well known as excellent lines for bait casting reels, in particular for trolling where they remain especially popular among many fishermen.
