= Thin walled beam =

Structural element

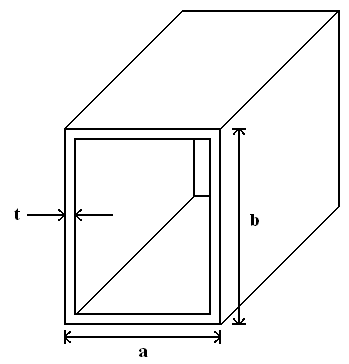
Cross-section of a box girder style closed thin-walled beam

A thin walled beam is a type of beam that does not have a solid cross sectional area. The cross section of a thin walled beam is made up from thin panels connected together. Common open section profiles include I-beams, T-beams, and L-beams. Closed sections include round, square, and rectangular tubes, all regarded as box girders or "box beams".

The advantages of thin walled beams are their lighter weight and their bending stiffness per unit cross sectional area, which is much higher than for solid cross sections such as a rod or bar. Thin-walled beams are found almost everywhere, in civil and naval engineering, as well as aeronautics and aerospace designs. Apart from lightweight construction, strong rigidity, and load resistance, there are also lower manufacturing costs, and lower transport and maintenance costs. They also give the designer more flexibility in the choice of material and shape to meet any specific requirements.

Thin walled beams are particularly useful when the material is a composite laminate. Pioneer work in this regard was done by Librescu.
