= Palomar knot =

Knot used in fishing

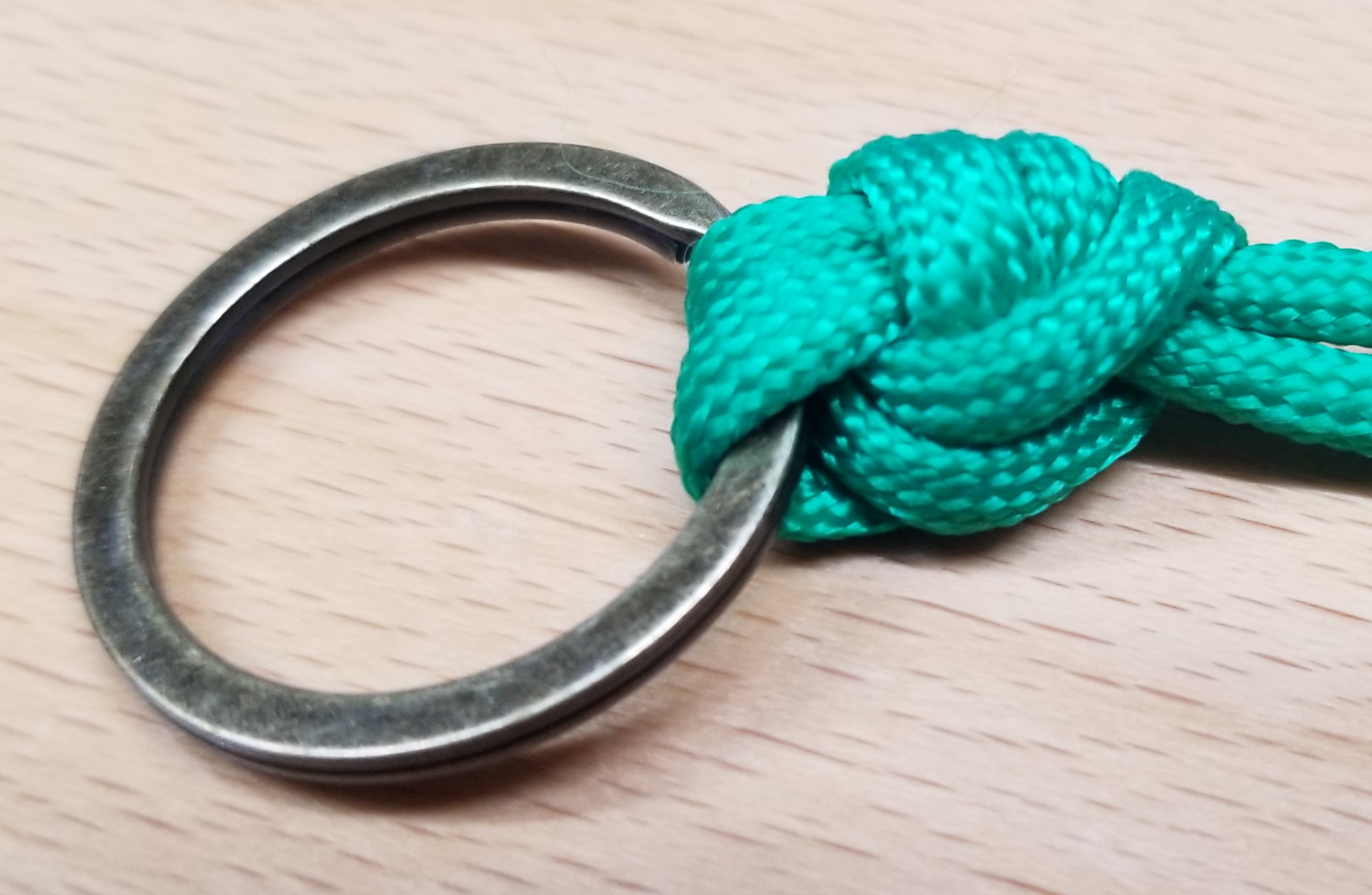
- Category: Hitch
- Releasing: Non-jamming
- Typical use: Fishing

The Palomar knot (/ˈpæləmɑːr/ PAL-ə-mar) is a knot that is used for securing a fishing line to a fishing lure, hook, or swivel. It is strong and easy to tie and with practice can even be tied in the dark. If tied properly, it leaves the hook free to rotate in the knot.

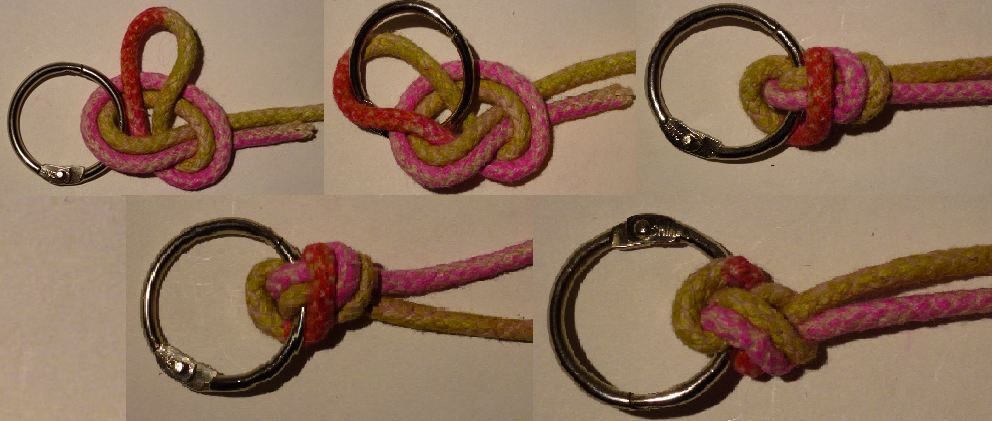
Steps in tying a Palomar knot (free end is colored red). 1. Tie the loose overhand knot. 2. Pass the object through the remaining loop. 3. Start snug. 4. Finish snug (pull evenly on standing ends). 5. View of obverse side.

To tie the knot first double 20-30 cm (8–12 in) of line into a loop and pass it through the eye of the hook, lure or swivel. Tie a very loose overhand knot using the doubled loop and the doubled section of line leading back to the fishing rod. Pass the object to be tied through the remaining loop of the overhand knot and slide the loop up onto the line just above the eye of the hook. Moisten the knot to lessen the friction and pull on the tag and standing ends evenly to snug the knot down. Trim the free end of the line to a length of about 3 mm.

This knot is good for all kinds of light fishing lines, especially braided Dacron, and retains almost all of the original line strength, even with monofilaments. It also is nearly impossible (if tied correctly) to "pull out". It is equally effective with other fastening applications – such as a dog clip to a rope – provided the object being tied to can pass through the loop, and the line or rope is not too thick to pass through the object twice, and, with practice, it can be tied in the dark with cold hands.

The Palomar Knot was developed by Chester J. “Chet” Palomar, a Scout leader and public servant from Pomona, California. He introduced the knot at a Fred Hall fishing show in 1971, where it impressed reps from DuPont so much that they adopted it as one of their best knots.

== Tying ==
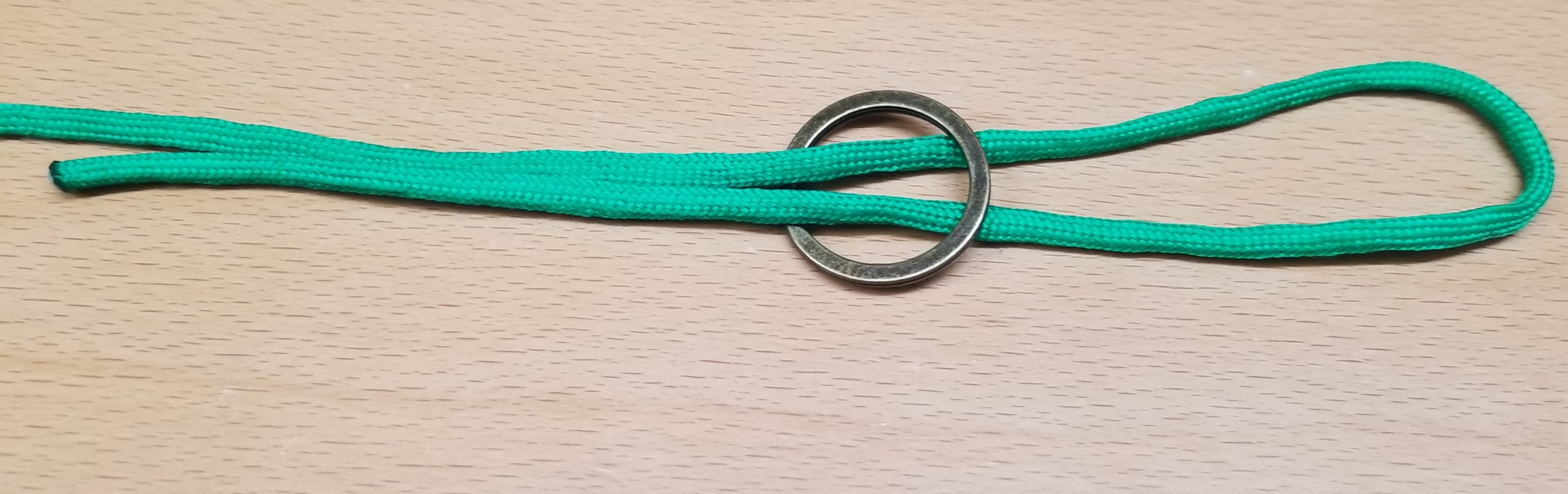
Make a bight and pass it through the ring.

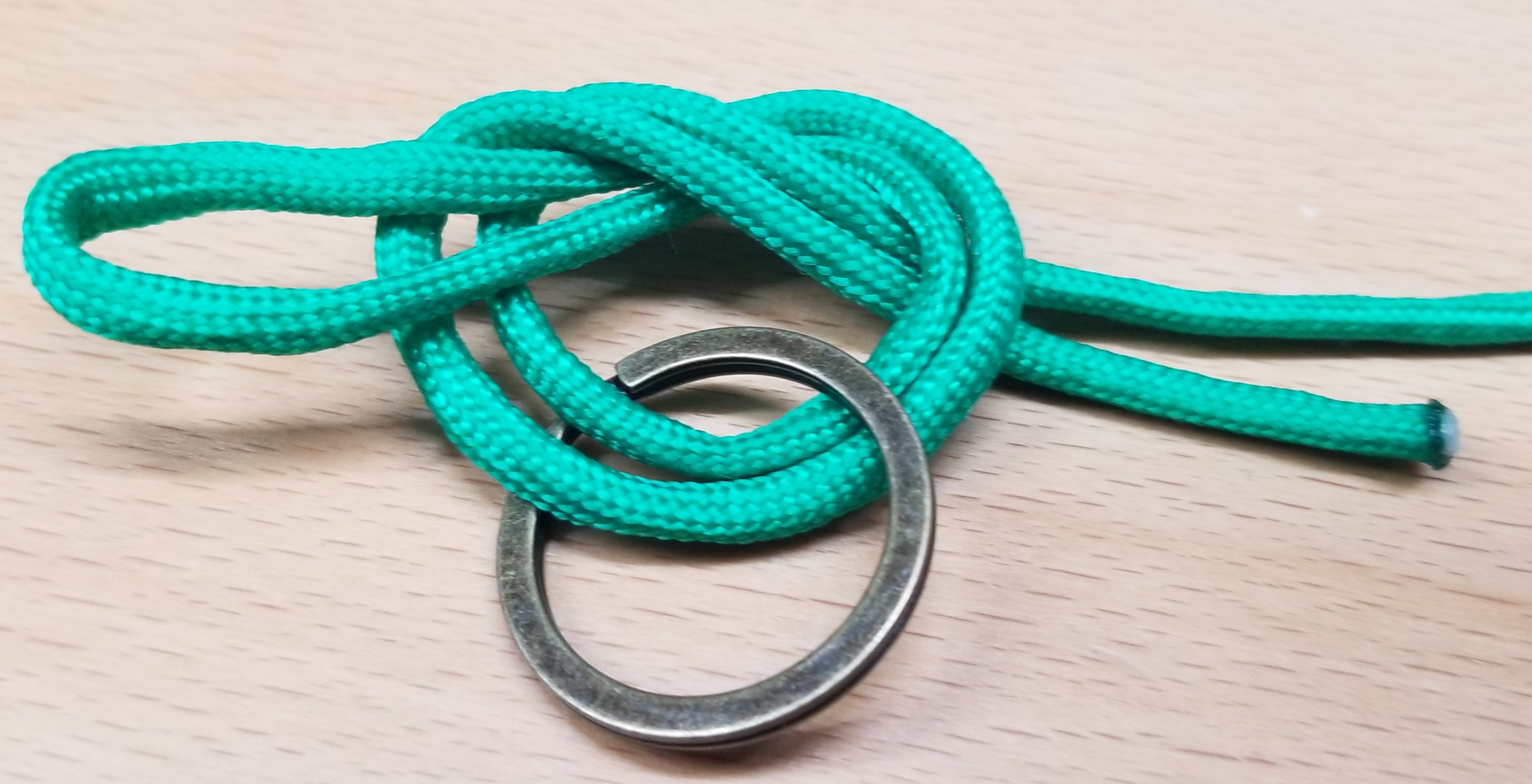
Form an overhand knot

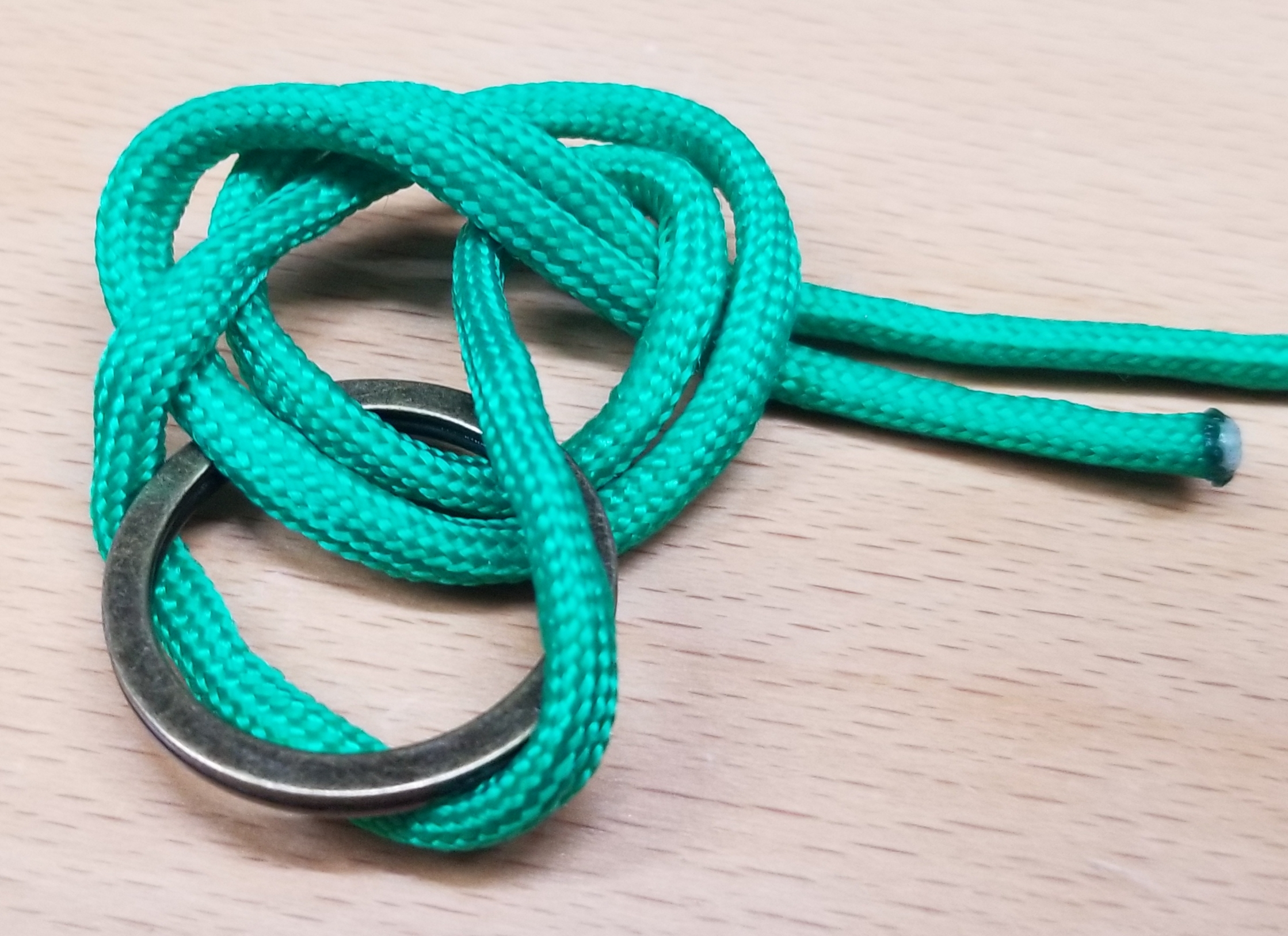
Pass the ring through the loop

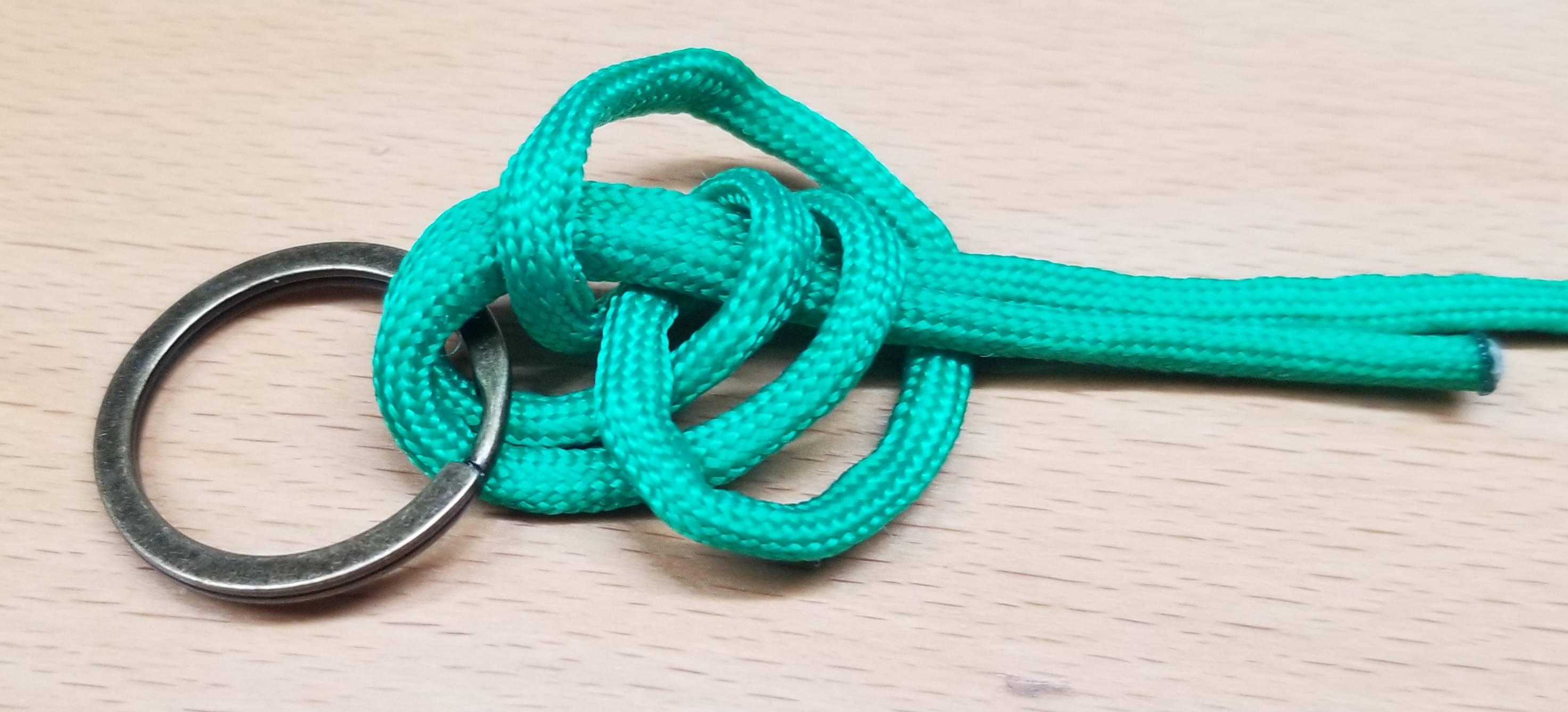
further back

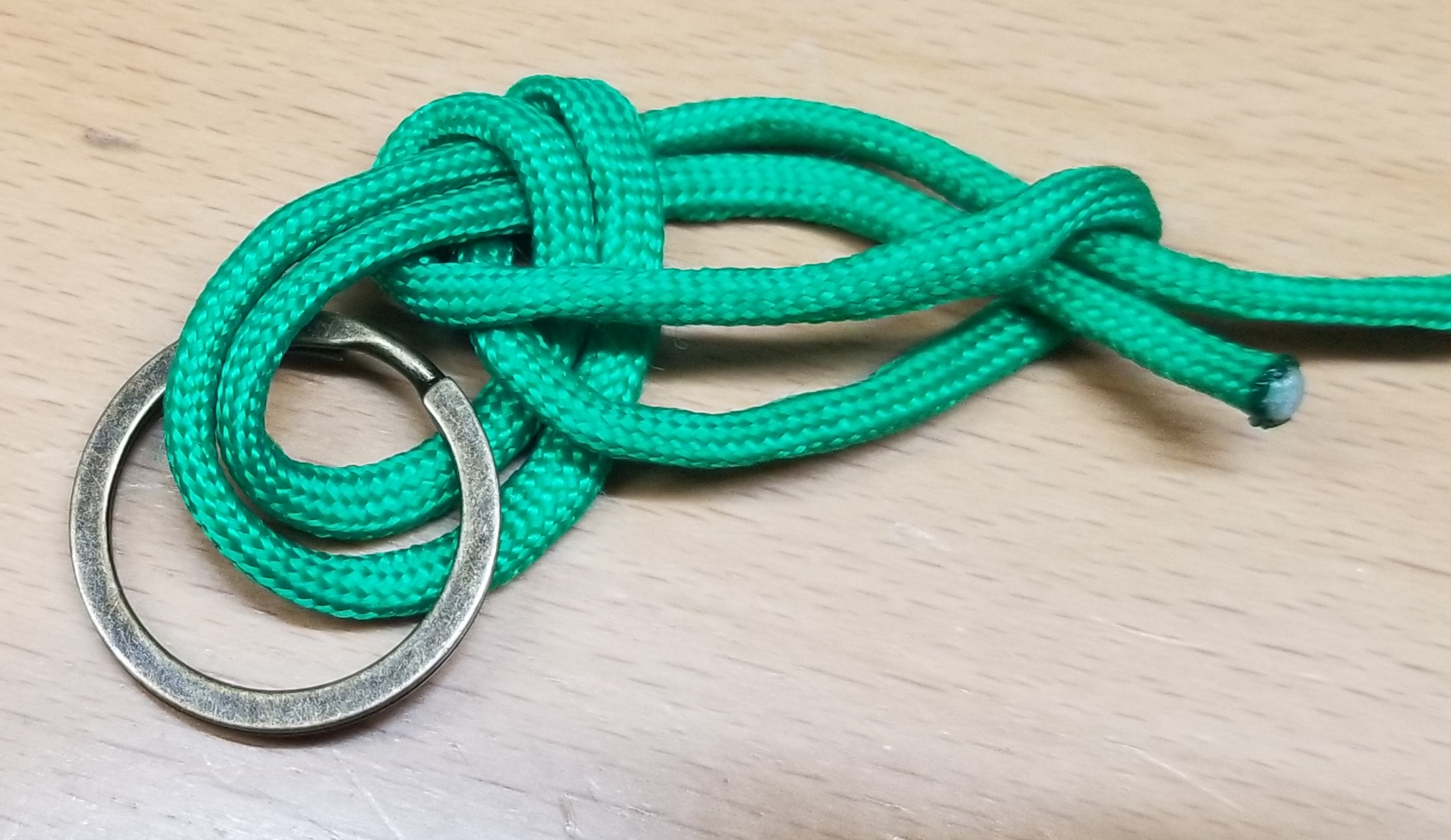
to the doubled line.

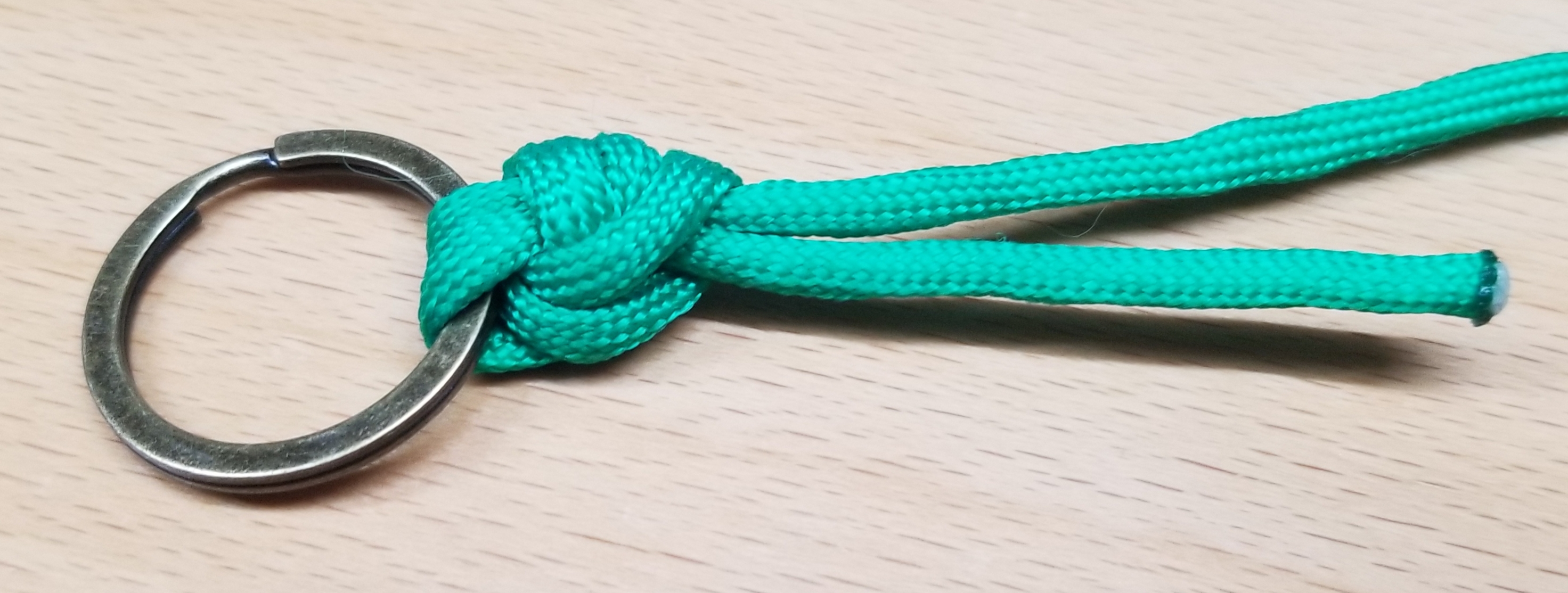
Trim the knot .

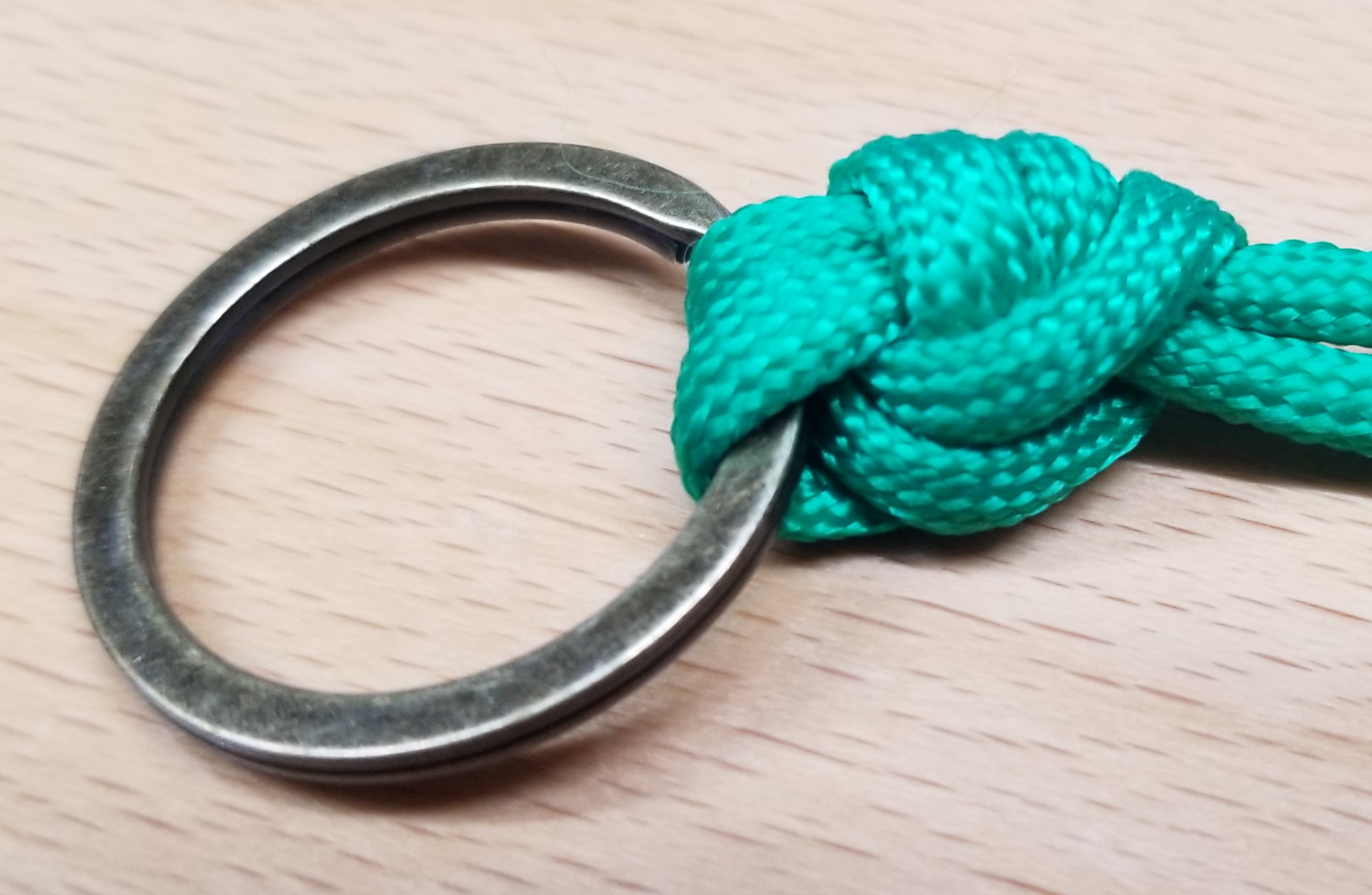
Finished.

== See also ==
- List of knots
