= Moisture expansion =

Scientific phenomenon

Moisture expansion is the tendency of matter to change its volume in response to a change in moisture content. The macroscopic effect is similar to that of thermal expansion but the microscopic causes are very different. Moisture expansion is caused by hygroscopy.
