= Monofilament fishing line =

Fishing line made from a single fiber of plastic

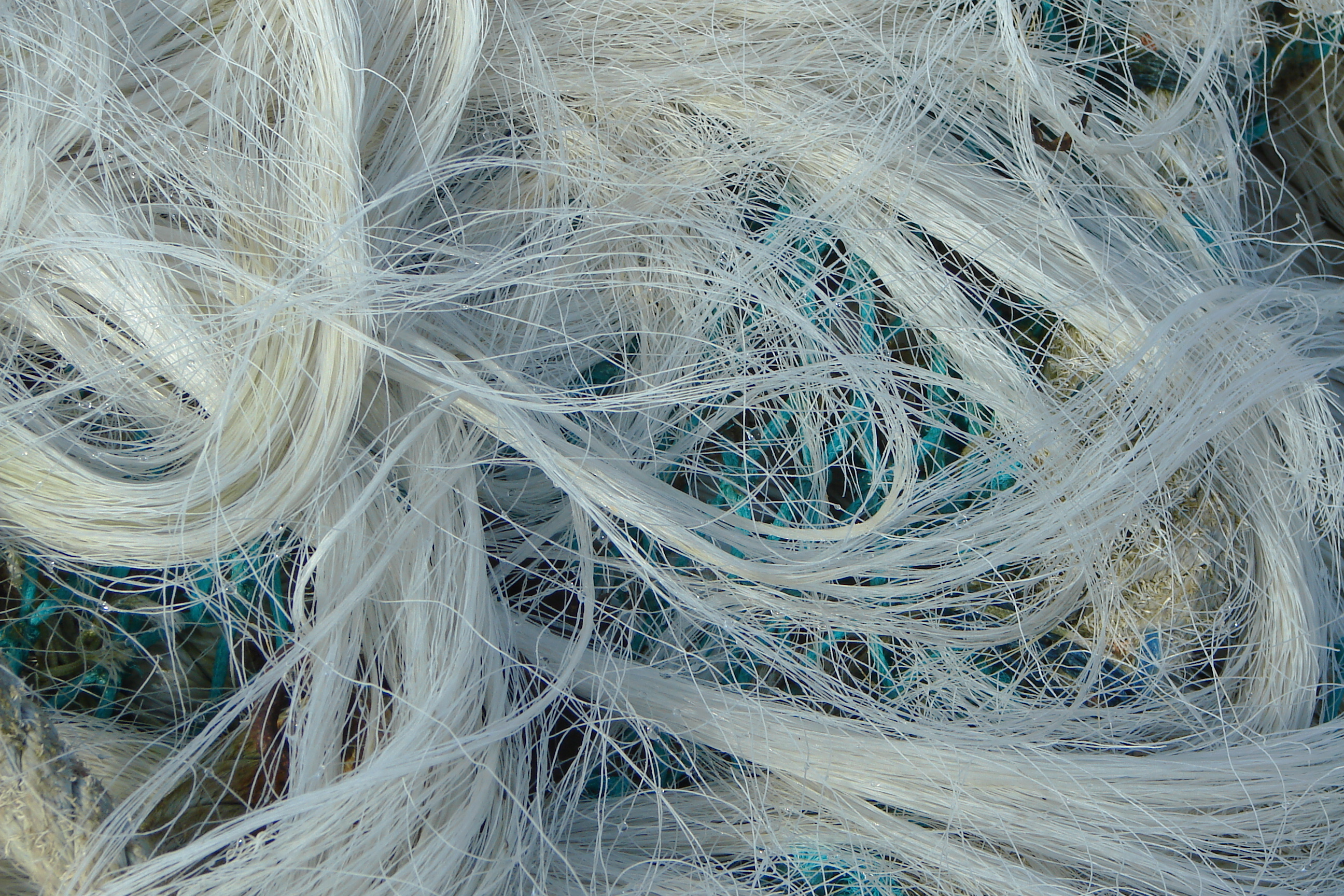
A tangle of monofilament fishing line. The most common colorless variety can be seen.

Monofilament fishing line (shortened to just mono) is fishing line made from a single fiber of plastic material, as opposed to multifilament or braided fishing lines constructed from multiple strands of fibers. Most fishing lines are now nylon monofilament because they are cheap to manufacture and can be produced in a range of diameters which have different tensile strengths (called "tests" after the process of tensile testing, or possibly as a portmanteau of "tensile" and "strength"). Monofilament line is also available in different colors, such as clear, white, green, blue, red, and fluorescent.

Monofilament is made by melting and mixing polymers and then extruding the mixture through tiny holes, forming strands of line, which is then spun into spools of various thicknesses. The extrusion process controls not only the thickness of the line but its test as well.

== History ==
DuPont made public in 1938 that their company had invented nylon. This new invention was the first synthetic fiber, fabrics that are commonly used in textiles today. In 1939, DuPont began marketing nylon monofilament fishing lines; however, braided Dacron lines remained the most used and popular fishing line for the next two decades, as early monofilament line was very stiff or "wiry", and difficult to handle and cast. Early monofilament did, however, have good knot strength and very low visibility to the fish, creating a small loyal following among fishermen. In 1959 DuPont introduced Stren, a thinner and much softer monofilament line that could be used in a large range of reels, including newly introduced spinning and spin casting tackle. Stren's monofilament lines soon became a favorite with many fishermen because of its overall ease of use and it spawned a whole host of imitators.

New materials, e.g., Spectra or Dyneema, are finding growing usage as fishing lines. Polyvinylidene fluoride (also sold as fluorocarbon or PVDF) is very much like nylon monofilament, but has several advantages. Optical density is lower, which makes the line less easily discernible. The surface is harder so it is more resistant to sharp fish teeth and wear. Furthermore, PVDF does not take up water and it is resistant to UV-light. It is denser than nylon, too, which makes it sink faster.

Dyneema is also becoming very popular and it is much stronger, but it is used mostly as a braided fishing line. Because the elastic stretching is only a fraction of that of nylon monofilament, the contact with fish or bait is more direct. It is often used for deep water fishing from boats because lower diameters are used, which give less resistance to currents, and the low stretch makes bites easily detectable.

== Specialty lines ==
=== Fluorocarbon line ===
Some modern monofilament lines are made from polyvinylidene fluoride (PVDF), a fluoropolymer often marketed as fluorocarbon. Fluorocarbon lines or "fluoro lines" are valued for their similar refractive index to that of water, making it less visible to fish, which may not swallow the bait if it sees the line. Fluorocarbon lines have greater surface hardness than nylon lines and are more abrasion-resistant against underwater rocks and snags, yet are more shock-resilient than braided lines when fighting fish, thus making them ideal to use as leader lines especially when the mainline is braided. They also have less memory, stretch and moisture expansion than nylon lines, making it easier to keep the line taut and transmit vibrations, which is essential in lure fishing where the angler is very reliant on tactile sensitivity. PVDF is also a denser material and therefore not nearly as buoyant as nylon monofilament, and anglers often utilize fluorocarbon lines when they need lighter baits/lures to sink more quickly and stay deeper below the surface without using heavy sinkers.

=== Copolymer line ===
A newer type of modern monofilament lines are composite lines that are fused from at least two different substrates via a process known as copolymerization. Most copolymer lines are nylon-based polymer blends fusing a blend of nylon with another higher-density one, although recently "tripolymer" lines that fuse three different blends of nylon have also appeared on the market. Compared to conventional single-blend ("plain") monofilament lines, copolymer lines have much higher test weight (strength) especially for small diameters, have less stretch, and are more abrasion-resistant. They are stronger than fluorocarbon lines per diameter but also less rigid, which makes them more shock-resilient and knot-friendly, although also more susceptible to wind-knotting (random entanglement of loose line loops). Like plain monofilament lines, copolymer lines tend to sink slowly in water, and are better suited for lure fishing near the surface (e.g. dry fly fishing).

Some copolymer lines are additionally coated with fluoropolymer (trademarked as "FluoroKote") to give more fluorocarbon-like surface property and to change the refractive index, as well as to also allow faster sinking as the added fluoropolymers are generally denser than nylon.

== Use ==
Monofilament fishing line is used in a huge variety of fishing applications.

Monofilament is not advisable for deepwater fishing, since it can absorb water, resulting in loose knots, and its sensitivity can decrease when it is wet. Monofilament degrades with time and can weaken when exposed to heat, sunlight, and/or saltwater. When stored on a spool for a long time, it may come off the fishing reel in coils or loops. It is advisable to change the monofilament line at regular intervals to prevent degradation.

=== Non-fishing uses ===
Monofilament fishing line is sometimes used in medicine as a pricking tool to examine the dermatomal fine touch.

The transparency of monofilament fishing line makes it desirable for special effects where objects need to look like they are floating unsupported.

It has also been used for string trimmers, musical instrument strings, sewing thread and bent in the shape of a staple for use as a septum piercing retainer.

== Environmental impact ==
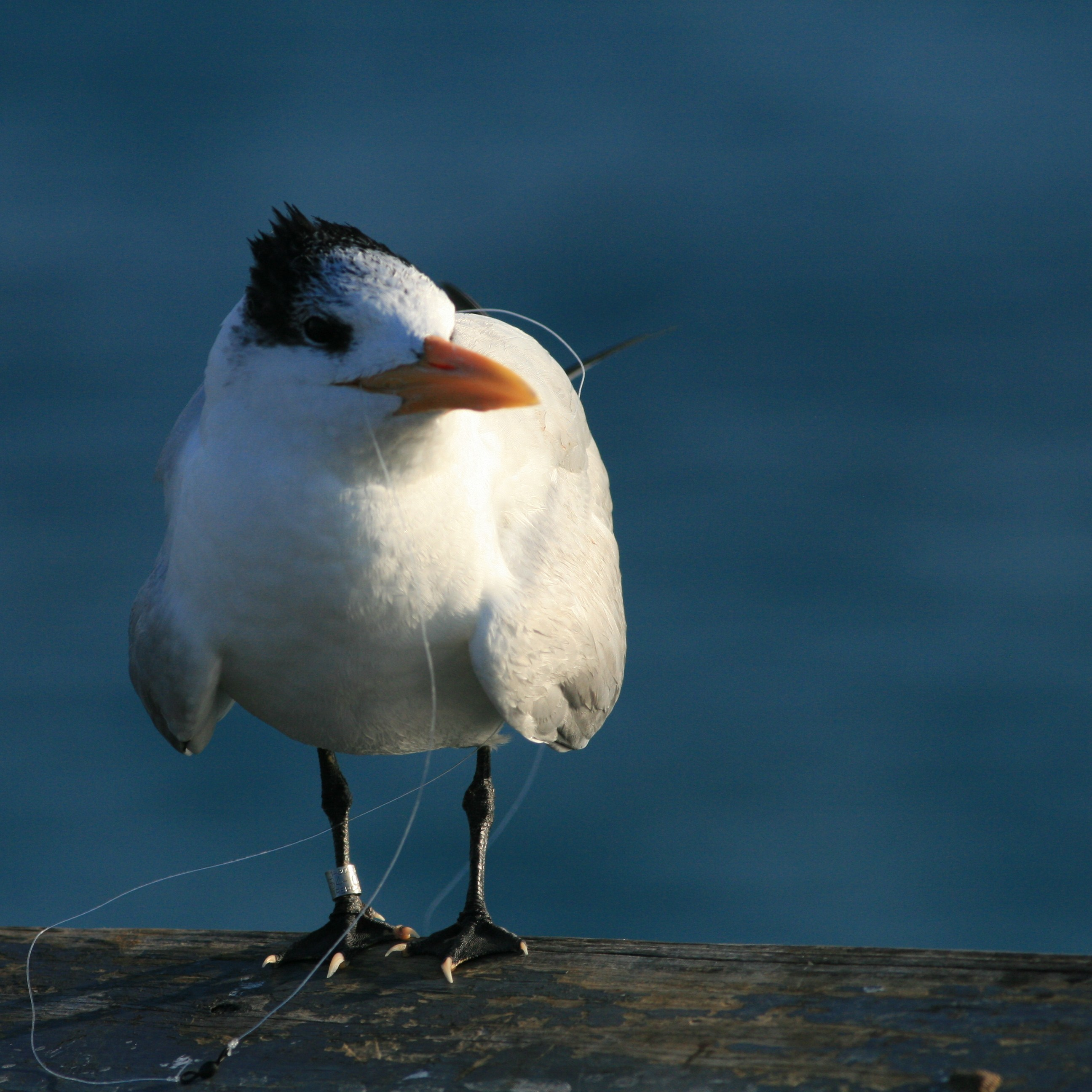
A royal tern entangled in monofilament line. It appears as though some of the line may have been ingested.

Discarded monofilament lines can present serious environmental problems. These lines are extremely difficult to spot when submerged in water, and fish, birds, and other marine life can easily become entangled, causing starvation, amputation, and death. Ingestion is also a serious threat to wildlife. Monofilament lines also present a risk to swimmers and scuba divers. The breakdown of lines, especially in string trimmers, leads to microplastics which may cause starvation or poisoning of organisms in soil or water.

For these reasons, programs have been started to recycle fishing line, to keep it out of the environment. Specialized containers have been designed to collect fishing line for recycling.

== See also ==
- Braided line
- Multifilament line
- Ghost net
