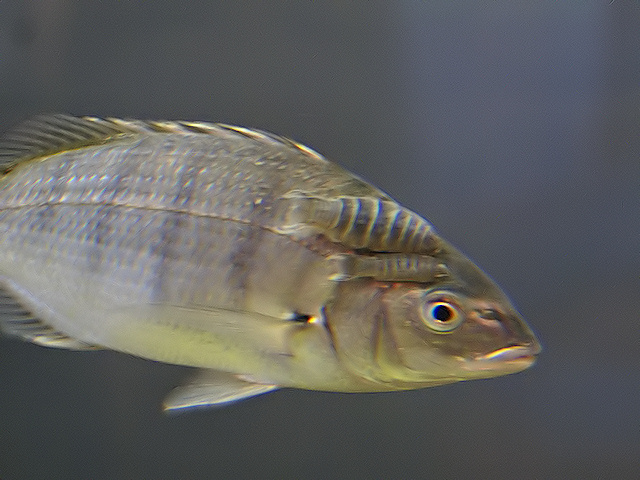
- Anilocra capensis, an isopod parasite, on Lithognathus aureti

Conservation status
- Endangered (IUCN 3.1)

Scientific classification
- Kingdom: Animalia
- Phylum: Chordata
- Class: Actinopterygii
- Division: Teleostei
- Order: Acanthuriformes
- Family: Sparidae
- Genus: Lithognathus
- Species: L. aureti

Binomial name
- Lithognathus aureti Smith, 1962

= West coast seabream =

Species of fish

The west coast seabream or west coast steenbras (Lithognathus aureti) is a species of marine fish in the family Sparidae. It is found in very shallow water off the coasts of to Angola, Namibia and South Africa. The International Union for Conservation of Nature lists its conservation status as being "Endangered".

== Description ==
The west coast seabream is a deep-bodied fish that can grow to a length of about 100 cm (39 in). The maximum recorded weight is 19.3 kilograms (43 lb). The head is shorter than its depth, and the profile is slightly convex above the eye. There are no scales on the snout and the upper jaw is protrusible. The teeth are small, with a single outer row of pointed teeth and two inner rows of small molars. The dorsal fin has eleven spines and nine to ten soft rays, and the anal fin has three spines and eight to nine soft rays. The pectoral fin is longer than the head and has fifteen to sixteen soft rays. The colour is silvery-grey with about seven faint, vertical bars which are more visible in young fish. This species could be confused with the sand steenbras (Lithognathus mormyrus), but that has a shallower body, more rays in its dorsal and anal fins, and ten to fourteen dark bars. The white steenbras (Lithognathus lithognathus) is also similar, but has a longer head and more slender body.

== Distribution and habitat ==
Endemic to the coast of southwestern Africa, the west coast seabream's range extends from Rio Longa, in Angola, to Cape Town, South Africa, but it is uncommon outside Namibian waters. It occurs in two separate populations; one in the northern and central part of Namibia and one around Meob Bay in the south. It lives close inshore in the surf zone, usually at depths of less than 10 m (33 ft) over sandy seabeds.

== Ecology ==
The west coast seabream feeds on invertebrates on the seabed such as crabs, polychaete worms and bivalve molluscs.

This fish is a protandric hermaphrodite. This means it starts its adult life as a male and later changes its sex to female. As a male, the average age to reach maturity is about 4.8 years for northern populations and about 6 years for southern ones. As a female, the average ages are 7.2 and 9.7 respectively. The eggs are spawned in the surf zone and tend to drift northwards with the sea current.

== Status ==
The northern population of west coast seabream is a popular fish with rock-and-surf sea anglers, and the southern population is sometimes the target of commercial line-fishing. The total population is declining and because of its slow growth rate and longevity, this fish is susceptible to over-fishing. Because of this, the International Union for Conservation of Nature has listed its conservation status as being "Endangered".
