= Karanteen =

Karanteen refers to two species of fish in the Sparidae family:

- Salema porgy (Sarpa salpa)
- Crenidens crenidens
