= Crenidens macracanthus =

Conservation status
- Data Deficient (IUCN 3.1)

Scientific classification
- Kingdom: Animalia
- Phylum: Chordata
- Class: Actinopterygii
- Order: Acanthuriformes
- Family: Sparidae
- Genus: Crenidens
- Species: C. macracanthus

Binomial name
- Crenidens macracanthus Günther, 1874

Species of ray-finned fish

Crenidens macracanthus, Günther's karanteen, is a species of marine ray-finned fish belonging to the family Sparidae, which includes the seabreams and porgies. This fish is found in the Indian Ocean.

== Taxonomy ==
Crenidens macracanthus was first formally described in 1874 by the German-born British herpetologist and ichthyologist Albert Günther with its type locality as Madras in India, on the Bay of Bengal. This taxon was previously treated as a synonym of Crenidens crenidens but was recognised as a valid species in 2013. The genus Crenidens is placed in the family Sparidae within the order Spariformes by the 5th edition of Fishes of the World. Some authorities classify this genus in the subfamily Boopsinae, but the 5th edition of Fishes of the World does not recognise subfamilies within the Sparidae.

== Etymology ==
Crenidens macracanthus has the specific name macracanthus which means "large spined", a reference to the larger spines in the dorsal and anal fins relative to C. crenidens.

== Description ==
Crenidens macracanthus differs from its congeners by its second anal fin spine being much longer than the third. It has 12 spines and 10 soft rays supporting the dorsal fin while in the other species it is typically supported by 11 spines and 11 soft rays. Their teeth are also different being incisoriform with 5 points all roughly being equal in side, the three middle points being notably larger than the two outer points in the other species. The number of pored lateral line scales is lower, 47 or 48, compared to between 49 and 53 in C. crenudens and C. indicus. This species has a maximum published standard length of 14.6 cm (5.7 in).

== Distribution ==
Crenidens macracanthus has been recorded from Chennai on the east coast of India and Karachi in Pakistan.

== Biology ==
Crenidens macracanthus has a diet mainly consisting of algae, it's dentition appears to be specialised for grazing on algae.
