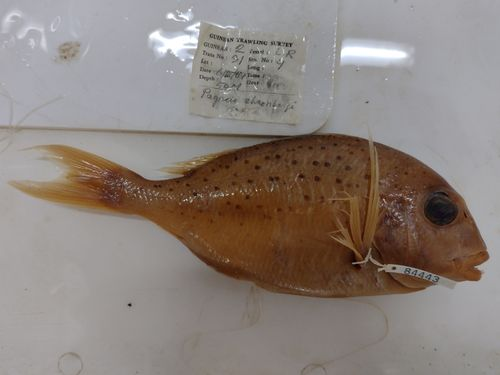

Scientific classification
- Kingdom: Animalia
- Phylum: Chordata
- Class: Actinopterygii
- Order: Acanthuriformes
- Family: Sparidae
- Genus: Evynnis
- Species: E. ehrenbergii

Binomial name
- Evynnis ehrenbergii (Valenciennes, 1830)

Synonyms
- Pagrus ehrenbergii Valenciennes, 1830; Sparus ehrenbergii (Valenciennes, 1830)

= Evynnis ehrenbergii =

Species of fish

Evynnis ehrenbergii is a species of marine ray-finned fish belonging to the family Sparidae, which includes the seabreams and porgies. This species is found in the Eastern Atlantic Ocean and the Mediterranean Sea.

== Taxonomy ==
Evynnis ehrenbergii was first formally described in 1830 as Pagrus ehrenbergii by the French zoologist Achille Valenciennes with its type locality given as the Mediterranean Sea off Egypt. The genus Evynnis is placed in the family Sparidae within the order Spariformes by the 5th edition of Fishes of the World. Some authorities classify this genus in the subfamily Sparidae, but the 5th edition of Fishes of the World does not recognise subfamilies within the Sparidae.

== Etymology ==
Evynnis ehrenbergii has a specific name which honours Christian Gottfried Ehrenberg, the German biologist who first realised that this taxon was a different species from Argyrops spinifer from the Red Sea.

== Description ==
Evynnis ehrenbergii has 11 or 12 spines and between 9 and 14 soft rays supporting the dorsal fin and 3 spines and 8 or 9 soft rays supporting the anal fin. This species has a deep body which is slightly laterally compressed. The dorsal profile of the body is arched while the ventral profile is straight in the middle but curves upwards towards the caudal peduncle The body is covered in large scales. It has a large head with a steep and curved dorsal profile with medium-sized eyes. The jaws are subequal in length and has canine-like teeth at the front, two in the upper jaw and six in the lower jaw, and molar-like teeth at the rear of both jaws. The first two spines of the dorsal fin are very short, while the third is elongated, particularly in younger fish. The body is purplish pink in colour with silvery tints on the sides and silvery whitish on the belly. Above and immediately below the lateral line there is a pattern of blue spots which become more distinct to the rear of the anal fin. The anal fin is blueish in colour while the caudal fin may be bright pink in colour. During the spawning season, the males become golden ochre in colour extending over the head and sometimes onto the back and flanks, but is most obvious on the snout. They also develop stripes above the eyes. This species has a maximum published total length of 43 cm (17 in) and a maximum published weight of 1.2 kg (2.6 lb).

== Distribution and habitat ==
Evynnis ehrenbergii is found in the Mediterranean Sea and in the eastern AtlanticOcean along the coast of West Africa. This species prefers warmer waters where it is found at depths between 30 and 50 m (98 and 164 ft) over sand or mud bottoms.

== Biology ==
Evynnis ehrenbergii spawns in the late spring. This species feeds on bivalves and gastropods, decapod crustaceans and fish, they will also prey on octopuses and worms.

== Fisheries ==
Evynnis ehrenbergii is caught using trawl nets.
