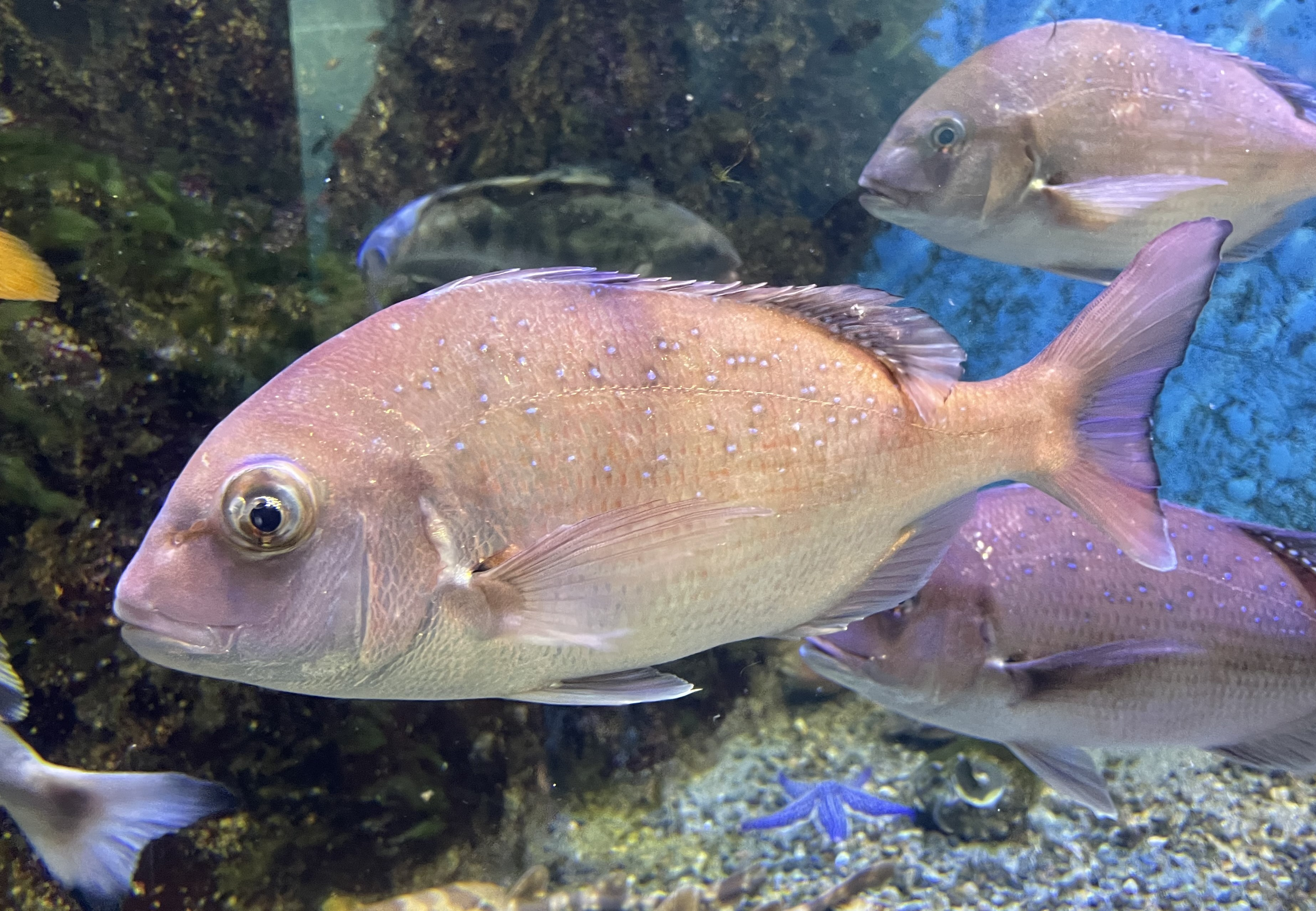

Conservation status
- Least Concern (IUCN 3.1)

Scientific classification
- Kingdom: Animalia
- Phylum: Chordata
- Class: Actinopterygii
- Order: Acanthuriformes
- Family: Sparidae
- Genus: Evynnis
- Species: E. tumifrons

Binomial name
- Evynnis tumifrons (Temminck & Schlegel, 1843)

Synonyms
- Chrysophrys tumifrons Temminck & Schlegel, 1843; Dentex tumifrons (Temminck & Schlegel, 1843); Taius tumifrons (Temminck & Schlegel, 1843); Evynnis japonica Tanaka, 1931

= Evynnis tumifrons =

Species of fish

Evynnis tumifrons, the yellowback seabream, crimson seabream, goldentail or red seabream, is a species of marine ray-finned fish belonging to the family Sparidae, which includes the seabreams and porgies. This fish is found in the Western Pacific Ocean off the coasts of East Asia. This species is an important food fish in the East China Sea and Japan.

== Taxonomy ==
Evynnis tumifrons was first formally described as Chrysophrys tumifrons in 1843 by the Dutch zoologist Coenraad Jacob Temminck and the German zoologist Hermann Schlegel with its type locality given as Japan. In 1931 the Japanese ichthyologist Shigeho Tanaka renamed Chrysophrys cardinalis, also described by Temminck and Schegel, as Evyniis japonica because Sparus cardinalis had been named by Bernard Germain de Lacépède in 1802. Temminck and Schlegel had used two types in their description of C. tumifrons and the larger of the two was shown to be an example of E. japonica while the smaller is a specimen of Dentex hypselosomus, so Tanaka's E. japonica is a junior synonym of Chrysophrys tumifrons. The genus Evynnis is placed in the family Sparidae within the order Spariformes by the 5th edition of Fishes of the World. Some authorities classify this genus in the subfamily Sparinae, but the 5th edition of Fishes of the World does not recognise subfamilies within the Sparidae.

== Etymology ==
Evynnis tumifrons has the specific name tumifrons which combines tumis, meaning a "swelling", with frons meaning "front" or "forehead", an allusion to the bulge close to the eyes, especially prominent in larger specimens.

== Description ==
Evynnis tumifrons has a robust, compressed and deep body, with the depth of its head being markedly greater than its length. The body has a depth which fits into its standard length 2.1 times. The head has an oblique upper profile which bulges near to the eye. The front of the upper jaw has 4 canine-like teeth with 4 or 6 of these in the lower jaw. Behind those are two rows of small molar-like teeth and there are conical teeth on the vomer. The dorsal fin is supported by 12 spines and 10 soft rays, the first 2 spines are short but robust and the third and fourth are extended into thin filaments, occasionally the fifth spine is similar. The soft rayed part of the dorsal fin is higher than the rear of the spiny part of that fin. The anal fin contains 3 spines and 9 soft rays with the first spine being short and the second and third spines being subequal to each other, although the second spine is typically just the shorter of the two. The caudal fin has a slight fork and pointed fin lobes. The pectoral fin typically has 15 fin rays and the flange of the gill cover is naked. The overall colour is pale, silvery pink, redder on the head and upper flanks, the fins and reddest on filaments extending out of the dorsal fin. There are lines of light blue spots running along the scale rows. This species has a maximum published total length of 35 cm (14 in) although 20 cm (7.9 in) is more typical.

== Distribution and habitat ==
Evynnis tumifrons is found in the Western Pacific Ocean off the coasts of East Asia and occurs from the four main islands of Japan, although it is absent from the Ogasawara and Ryukyu Islands, South Korea, Taiwan and China where it may occur as far south as Hong Kong. A record from Bali, Indonesia may be a misidentification of Dentex spariformis. This species is a demersal fish found at depths between 30 and 346 m (98 and 1,135 ft) over mud and sand substrates.

== Biology ==
Evynnis tumifrons is a predatory species, a study in the East China Sea found that it fed mainly on fishes, crustaceans and cephalopods. The most common species preyed on were the krill species Euphausia pacifica, the toothfish Champsodon snyderi, the Japanese jack mackerel (Trachurus japonicus) and prawns in the genus Solenocera. The juveniles live as either solitary fish or in schools and these differ in food preferences, the solitary fish preferred to feed on gammarids and caprelloids and copepods, while the schooling juveniles fish fed mainly on copepods, annelids and marine water fleas.

The yellowback seabream is a protogynous hermaphrodite the change of sex occurs at around four years old in the East China Sea. In the East China Sea there are two spawning seasons, one in the spring and another in the autumn. In the Sea of Japan this species is thought to spawn in April and May and again in August and September.

== Fisheries ==
Evynnis tumifrons is an important food fish, particularly in the East China Sea where it is caught using trawling. In Wakasa Bay, Japan, this species is caught using Danish seine nets and long lines and is an important part of the fishery.
