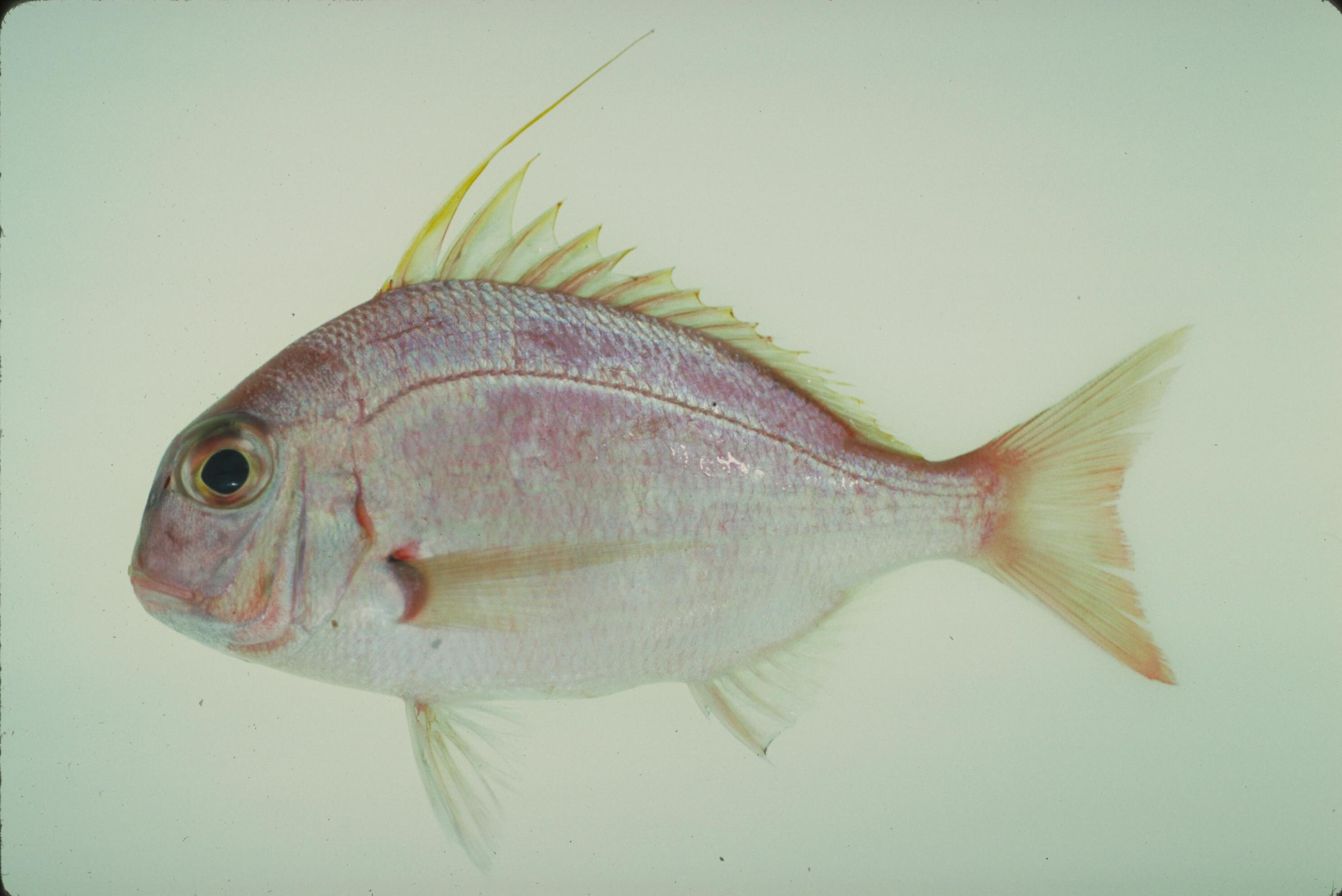

Conservation status
- Least Concern (IUCN 3.1)

Scientific classification
- Kingdom: Animalia
- Phylum: Chordata
- Class: Actinopterygii
- Order: Acanthuriformes
- Family: Sparidae
- Genus: Argyrops
- Species: A. filamentosus

Binomial name
- Argyrops filamentosus (Valenciennes, 1830)

Synonyms
- Pagrus filamentosus Valenciennes, 1830

= Argyrops filamentosus =

Species of fish

Argyrops filamentosus, the soldierbream, is a species of marine ray-finned fish belonging to the family Sparidae, the seabreams and porgies. This fish is found in the Western Indian Ocean.

== Taxonomy ==
Argyrops filamentosus was first formally described in 1830 as Pagrus filamentosus by the French zoologist Achille Valenciennes with its type locality given as Saint-Denis on Réunion. The genus Argyrops is placed in the family Sparidae within the order Spariformes by the 5th edition of Fishes of the World. Some authorities classify this genus in the subfamily Sparinae, but the 5th edition of Fishes of the World does not recognise subfamilies within the Sparidae.

== Etymology ==
Argyrops filamentosus has the specific name filamentosus, meaning "filamented", a references to the filamentous spines in the dorsal fin of this species.

== Description ==
Argyrops filamentosus has a deep body, with a standard length that is 2 to 2.5 times its depth, which is strongly compressed. The dorsal fin is supported by 11 or 12 spines and between 8 and 10 soft rays, the 3rd dorsal fin spine is double the length of the 4th and is greater than the length of the head. The anal fin is supported by 3 spines and 8 soft rays. The colour of the body is pink, with a bluish tint, on the upper body while the ventral surface is white. The fins are pink with the anal and pelvic fins being palest. The soldierbream has a maximum published total length of 70 cm (28 in), although 40 cm (16 in) is more typical.

== Distribution and habitat ==
Argyrops filamentosus is found in the Western Indian Ocean. It is found along the eastern coast of Africa from KwaZulu-Natal to the Red Sea, Madagascar and the Mascarenes. It is also found around the Arabian Peninsula into the Persian Gulf, as well as off Socotra. This species occurs on corals in warmer seas and on rocky reefs and sand substrates, at depths between 20 and 50 m (66 and 164 ft).
