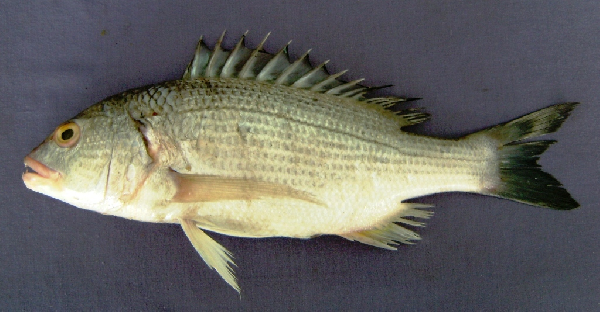
- Sobaity seabream caught near Pakistan

Conservation status
- Least Concern (IUCN 3.1)

Scientific classification
- Kingdom: Animalia
- Phylum: Chordata
- Class: Actinopterygii
- Division: Teleostei
- Order: Acanthuriformes
- Family: Sparidae
- Genus: Sparidentex
- Species: S. hasta

Binomial name
- Sparidentex hasta Valenciennes, 1830

= Sparidentex hasta =

Species of fish

Sparidentex hasta, the sobaity seabream, is a species of marine fish in the seabream (or porgy) family, Sparidae. It is also known as the silver black porgy, the sobaity bream, or simply the sobaity. Sobaity seabream are found in the Indian Ocean's Arabian Sea and Persian Gulf where they are commercially fished and farmed.

== Description ==
Commonly around 20 cm (7.9 in) in length, this species reaches a maximum length of 58 cm (1.90 ft). The dorsal fin of the sobaity seabream has 11 to 12 rays, while its anal fin usually has only 8. There are 5.5 rows of scales between the first dorsal ray and the lateral line (which contains 47–48 pored scales), while there are 12.5 rows below the lateral line.

== Distribution and habitat ==
The sobaity seabream can be found in both marine and brackish waters at tropical latitudes in the Indian Ocean. It is generally demersal and can be found at depths up to 20 m (66 ft). Sobaity seabream are especially known from coastal areas of the Persian Gulf, Arabian Sea and the western coast of the Indian subcontinent.

Sometime between 1975 and 1999, the sobaity seabream was accidentally introduced to the coastal waters of Australia. Individuals have been reported from the Swan River in Western Australia.

== Diet ==
The sobaity seabream, and other sparids of the Persian Gulf, feed on teleost fishes, arthropods such as crabs, shrimps, stomatopods, spiny lobsters, barnacles, amphipods, isopods and hermit crabs, and mollusks such gastropods, bivalves, and nudibranchs. Echinoderms, cephalopods, polychaete worms, and marine algae are also represented in the diet of these fishes.

== Relationship with humans ==
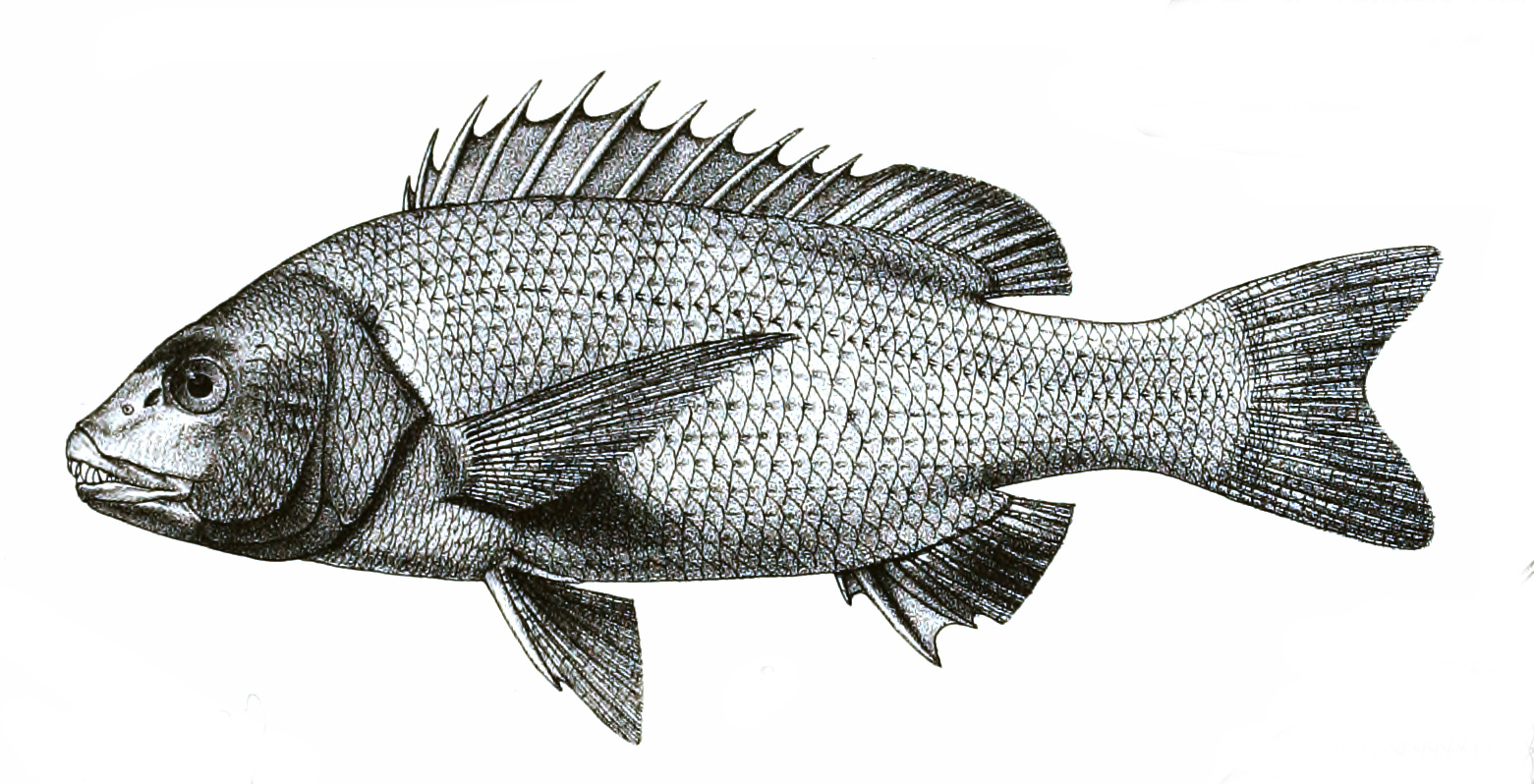
Drawing of the sobaity seabream by natural history illustrator George Henry Ford

S. hasta is fished commercially off the coasts of Bahrain, Saudi Arabia, and the United Arab Emirates, where these fish are usually sold fresh. It is considered to be of minor commercial importance, and reports of catches to the FAO began in 2000. Around this time, this species was also utilized in aquaculture in Bahrain, the UAE, and Kuwait. The fish is considered a delicacy in the Persian Gulf region, and dishes containing it are often associated with celebrations.

The sobaity seabream does not appear to be protected by any laws, though it is known to occur in protected areas. It has also been introduced to the eastern Indian Ocean near Oceania. The cause of some of these introductions may be related to the release of ship ballast from vessels traveling from elsewhere in the Indian Ocean.
