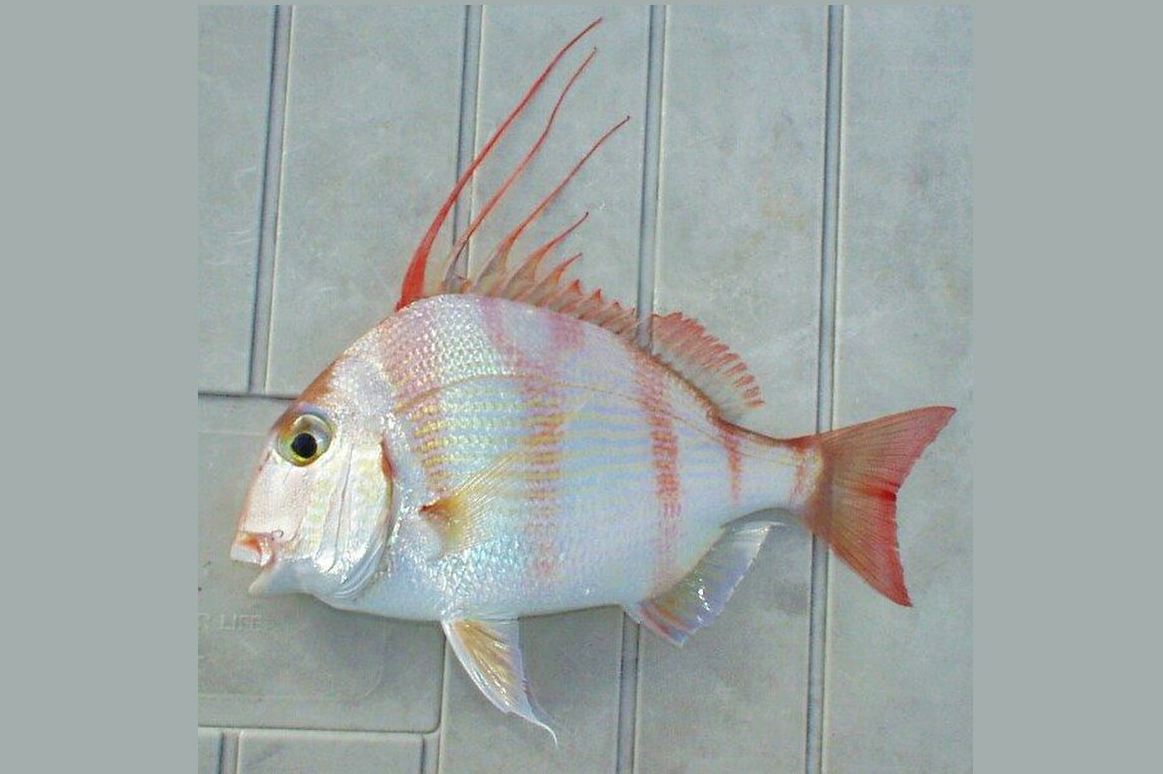
- juvenile

Conservation status
- Least Concern (IUCN 3.1)

Scientific classification
- Kingdom: Animalia
- Phylum: Chordata
- Class: Actinopterygii
- Order: Acanthuriformes
- Family: Sparidae
- Genus: Argyrops
- Species: A. bleekeri

Binomial name
- Argyrops bleekeri Oshima, 1927

= Argyrops bleekeri =

Species of fish

Argyrops bleekeri, also known as Taiwan tai, frypan bream, Bowen snapper, frypan snapper, king soldier bream, longfin snapper or longspine snapper, is a species of marine ray-finned fish belonging to the family Sparidae, the seabreams and porgies. This species is found in the western Pacific Ocean.

== Taxonomy ==
Argyrops bleekeri was first formally described in 1927 by the Japanese ichthyologist Masamitsu Ōshima with its type localities given as Meitsu, Nago and Miyazaki in Japan. This taxon has been considered to be a synonym of A spinifer. The genus Argyrops is placed in the family Sparidae within the order Spariformes by the 5th edition of Fishes of the World. Some authorities classify this genus in the subfamily Sparinae, but the 5th edition of Fishes of the World does not recognise subfamilies within the Sparidae.

== Etymology ==
Argyrops bleekeri has a specific name which honours the Dutch medical doctor and ichthyologist Pieter Bleeker who reported this species but identified it as Sparus spinifer in 1865.

== Description ==
Argyrops bleekeri has a deep, laterally compressed body. The dorsal fin has 11 spines and 10 soft rays supporting it, the first spine is very small with the second to fifth spines being elongated. The anal fin is supported by 3 spines and 8 or 9 soft rays. The overall colour is silvery-pink with pale red fins. Juveniles have a number of thin reddish vertical bands along the flanks. The frypan bream has a maximum published standard length of 50 cm (20 in), although 30 cm (12 in) is more typical.

== Distribution and habitat ==
Argyrops bleekeri is found in the western Pacific Ocean where it is found from Japan south to Australia. In Australia it is distributed from the region around Shark Bay in Western Australia across the northern tropical coasts to as far south as Yamba in New South Wales. It is found in areas of sandy and muddy substrates at depths between 30 and 100 m (98 and 328 ft).

== Fisheries ==
Argyrops bleekeri is considered to be a good food fish and is an important commercial species in some parts of the world. Fishers use trawls, lines and fish traps to take this species.
