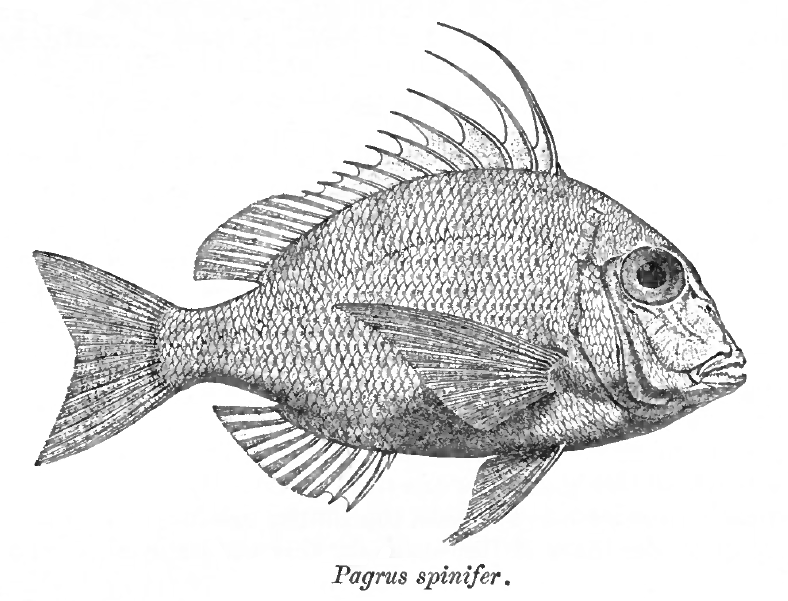
- Argyrops spinifer

Scientific classification
- Kingdom: Animalia
- Phylum: Chordata
- Class: Actinopterygii
- Order: Acanthuriformes
- Family: Sparidae
- Genus: Argyrops; Swainson, 1839

Type species
- Sparus spinifer Forsskål, 1775

Synonyms
- Dulosparus Fowler, 1933

= Argyrops =

Genus of fishes

Argyrops is a genus of marine ray-finned fishes belonging to the family Sparidae, the seabreams and porgies. These fishes are found in the coasts of Indian Ocean and near Australia.

== Taxonomy ==
Argyrops was first formally proposed as a subgenus of Chrysophrys by the English zoologist William Swainson with its type species, by monotypy, being Sparus spinifer. S. spinifer had been described in 1775 by Peter Forsskål with its type locality given as Jeddah. This genus is placed in the family Sparidae within the order Spariformes by the 5th edition of Fishes of the World. Some authorities classify this genus in the subfamily Sparinae, but the 5th edition of Fishes of the World does not recognise subfamilies within the Sparidae.

== Etymology ==
Argyrops was not explained by Swainson but is may combine argyros, meaning "silver", and ops, meaning "face", the type species has a silvery lower jaw.

== Species ==
Argyrops contains the following species:

- Argyrops bleekeri Oshima, 1927 (Taiwan tai)
- Argyrops caeruleops Iwatsuki & Heemstra, 2018 (Bluesnout soldierbream)
- Argyrops filamentosus (Valenciennes, 1830) (Soldierbream)
- Argyrops flavops Iwatsuki & Heemstra, 2018 (Yellow-snout soldierbream)
- Argyrops megalommatus (Klunzinger, 1870) (Red Sea soldierbream)
- Argyrops notialis Iwatsuki & Heemstra, 2018 (Australian soldierbream)
- Argyrops spinifer (Forsskål, 1775) (King soldierbream)

== Characteristics ==
Argyrops fishes are characterised by having a very blunt snout and heavy head. The first 1 or 2 dorsal fin spines are short, with a long 3rd spine and occasionally the 4th to the 7th times are elongated into filaments and have a greater length than the head. The front teeth are conical and there are 2 or 3 rows of small molar-like teeth. The area between the eyes is scaly. The flange of the preoperculum is not scaled. The colour of these fishes is frequently reddish. The largest species in the genus is the king soldierbream (A.spinifer) with a maximum published total length of 80 cm (31 in) while the smallest is the Red Sea soldierbream (A. megalommatus) which has a maximum published standard length of 20.7 cm (8.1 in).

== Distribution ==
Argyrops seabreams are mainly found in the Indian Ocean from the Red Sea and African coasts east to Australia, with one species A. bleekeri in the Western Pacific Ocean.
