= Burtinia =

Burtinia Temporal range: Middle Eocene

Scientific classification
- Domain: Eukaryota
- Kingdom: Animalia
- Phylum: Chordata
- Class: Actinopterygii
- Order: Acanthuriformes
- Family: Sparidae
- Genus: †Burtinia van Beneden, 1873
- Species: †B. bruxelliensis

Binomial name
- †Burtinia bruxelliensis van Beneden, 1873

Extinct genus of fishes

Burtinia is an extinct genus of prehistoric seabream that lived during the middle Eocene. It contains a single species, B. bruxelliensis from the Lede Formation of Belgium.

== See also ==
- Prehistoric fish
- List of prehistoric bony fish
