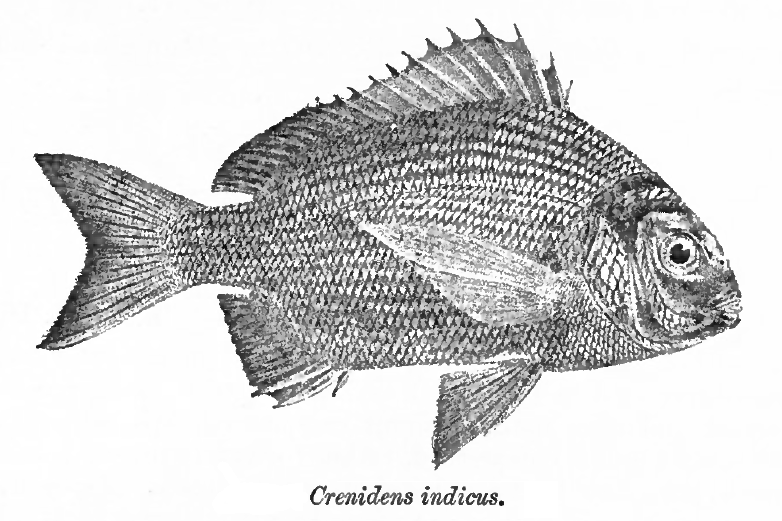
- Crenidens indicus

Scientific classification
- Kingdom: Animalia
- Phylum: Chordata
- Class: Actinopterygii
- Order: Acanthuriformes
- Family: Sparidae
- Genus: Crenidens; Valenciennes, 1830

Type species
- Crenidens forskalii Valenciennes, 1830

= Crenidens =

Genus of fishes

Crenidens is a small genus of three species of seabream from the family Sparidae from the western Indian Ocean. It was previously regarded as monotypic, with the sole species being the Karenteen sea bream Crenidens crenidens but two other species are now accepted as valid species, separate from the type species, C. crenidens.

== Taxonomy ==
Crenidens was first proposed as a monospecific genus in 1830 by the French zoologist Achille Valenciennes with Crenidens forsskalii as its only species and the type species by monotypy. C. forsskalii is now considered to be a synonym of Sparus crenidens, originally described by Peter Forsskål from the Red Sea of Saudi Arabia and Egypt in 1775. This genus is placed in the family Sparidae within the order Spariformes by the 5th edition of Fishes of the World. Some authorities classify this genus in the subfamily Boopsinae, but the 5th edition of Fishes of the World does not recognise subfamilies within the Sparidae.

== Etymology ==
Crenidens combines creni, meaning “crenulate”, with dens, which means “teeth”, an allusion to the crenulate incisor-like teeth of these fishes. This is not tautonymous with Sparus crenidens as Valenciennes had unnecessarily renamed that species C. forskalii.

== Species ==
Crenidens contains three recognised species. It was considered to be monotypic but a second and third species are now regarded as valid.

- Crenidens crenidens (Forsskål, 1775) (Karanteen seabream)
- Crenidens indicus Day, 1873 (Day's karanteen seabream)
- Crenidens macracanthus Günther (1874 (Günther's karanteen)

== Characteristics ==
Crenidens seabreams have 2 rows of incisor-like teeth in each jaw, there may be a third row in the upper jaw, these teeth have 5 points on their cutting edges and the brown edged outer teeth can be moved. They also have several rows of molar like teeth. The cheeks are scaled and there are no curved teeth in the front of the mouth. They have deep, uniformly coloured bodies with relatively small eyes. The largest species in the genus is C. crenidens with a maximum published total length of 30 cm (12 in) while the smallest is C. macracanthus which has a maximum published standard length of 14.6 cm (5.7 in).

== Distribution ==
Crenidens seabreams are native to the Indian Ocean. C. crenidens has colonised the Mediterranean Sea probably by Lessepsian migration from the Red Sea through the Suez Canal.
