= Amamiichthys =

Conservation status
- Vulnerable (IUCN 3.1)

Scientific classification
- Kingdom: Animalia
- Phylum: Chordata
- Class: Actinopterygii
- Order: Acanthuriformes
- Family: Sparidae
- Genus: Amamiichthys; F. Tanaka & Iwatsuki, 2015
- Species: A. matsubarai

Binomial name
- Amamiichthys matsubarai (Akazaki, 1962)

Synonyms
- Cheimerius matsubarai Akazaki, 1962

Genus of fishes

Amamiichthys is a monospecific genus of marine ray-finned fish belonging to the family Sparidae, the seabreams and porgies. Its only species is Amamiichthys matsubarai, the Japanese blue-spotted seabream or hosheirenko. This species is endemic to the Amami Islands of southern Japan.

== Taxonomy ==
Amamiichthys was first proposed as a genus in 2015 by the Japanese ichthyologists Fumiya Tanaka and Yukio Iwatsuki with its only species being Cheimerius matsubarai. C. matsubarai was first formally described in 1962 by Masato Akazaki with its type locality given as off Naze on Amami Ōshima in the Ryukyu Islands off southern Japan. The genus Amamiichthys is placed in the family Sparidae within the order Spariformes by the 5th edition of Fishes of the World. Some authorities classify this genus in the subfamily Denticinae, but the 5th edition of Fishes of the World does not recognise subfamilies within the Sparidae.

== Etymology ==
Amamiichthysis a compound of Amami, the only known location this fish occurs at, and ichthys, meaning fish. The specific name honours the ichthyologist and herpetologist Kiyomatsu Matsubara, who reviewed the monograph in which Akazaki published his original description and thanked him for his teaching and suggestions.

== Description ==
Amamiichthys has 12 spines. the first two spines being very short and the next two being extended almost into filaments, and 10 soft rays supporting its dorsal fin while its anal fin is supported by 3 spines and 8 soft rays. The upper and lower jaws have an outer row of small molar-like teeth and an inner row of, even smaller, molar-like teeth. The colour of the head and body is pinkish, fading to silvery towards the ventral surface with the upper body is marked with small blue spots, some of these overlap with their neighbouring spot. This fish has a maximum published standard length of 60 cm (24 in).

== Distribution and habitat ==
Amamiichthys is known only from the Amami-Oshima in the Ryukyu Islands off southern Japan. It is thought to be restricted to southern Amami-Oshima where it is found on deep reefs at depths between 50 and 100 m (160 and 330 ft).

== Fisheries and conservation ==
Amamiichthys is caught as a food fish and is also taken by recreational fishers, it is sold in fish markets and supermarkets on Amami. It is not one of the main target species for commercial fisheries around the island and its preference for deeper water may protect it from overfishing. However, it has a very restricted range and the International Union for Conservation of Nature classifies its conservation status as Vulnerable.
