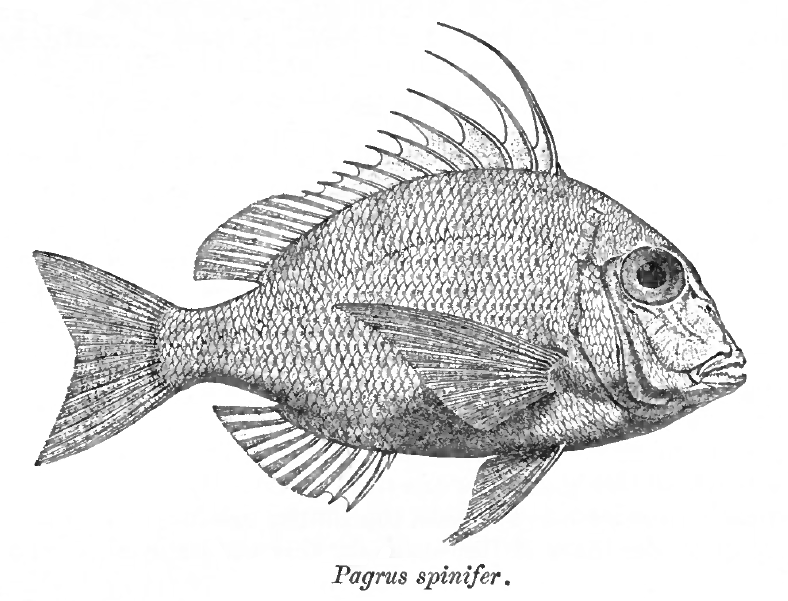

Conservation status
- Least Concern (IUCN 3.1)

Scientific classification
- Kingdom: Animalia
- Phylum: Chordata
- Class: Actinopterygii
- Order: Acanthuriformes
- Family: Sparidae
- Genus: Argyrops
- Species: A. spinifer

Binomial name
- Argyrops spinifer (Forsskål, 1775)

Synonyms
- Sparus spinifer Forsskål, 1775; Pagrus longifilis Valenciennes, 1830; Pagrus ruber Boulenger, 1888; Pagrus ciliaris von Bonde, 1923; Calamus ciliaris (von Bonde, 1923)

= Argyrops spinifer =

Species of fish

Argyrops spinifer, the king soldierbream, Bowen snapper, long-spined red bream, longfin snapper, longspine seabream and red bokako, It is a species of marine ray-finned fish belonging to the family Sparidae. This species is found in the Indian Ocean.

== Taxonomy ==
Argyrops spinifer was first formally described as Sparus spinifer in 1775 by the Swedish-speaking Finnish naturalist and explorer Peter Forsskål with its type locality given as Jeddah in Saudi Arabia. In 1839 William Swainson proposed a new monotypic subgenus, Argyrops of Chrysophrys for this species, so this species is the type species of the genus Argyrops. Argyrops bleekeri of Australia and the Western Pacific has been considered to be conspecific with this species but they are now regarded as valid separate species. This species forms a species complex with A. flavops, described in 2018 from the Arabian Sea. The genus Argyrops is placed in the family Sparidae within the order Spariformes by the 5th edition of Fishes of the World. Some authorities classify this genus in the subfamily Sparinae, but the 5th edition of Fishes of the World does not recognise subfamilies within the Sparidae.

== Etymology ==
Argyrops spinifer has the specific name spinifer, which means "thorn bearer", which Forsskål did not explain, but it is assumed to refer to the simple, forward pointing first dorsal fin spine.

== Description ==
Argyrops spinifer has its dorsal fin supported by between 11 and 13 spines, the first 2 spines being very short and located on the same dorsal pterygiophore, and 9 or 10 soft rays. In this species and A. flavops the presence of 4–6 very long and filamentous spines in the dorsal fin, typically the 3rd to 6th or 3rd to 8th, in both juveniles and subadults is a character separating them from other Argyrops species. The anal fin has 3 spines and 8 soft rays. This fish has a deep and strongly compressed body which has a standard length that is between 1.8 and 2 times its depth. I larger adults, i.e. those with a standard length in excess of 60 cm (24 in) there is a convex growth on the nape. The main colour on the body is silvery pinkish, darker on head and upperbody. The upper opercular margin is typically dark red and all the fins are reddish with the pelvic and anal fins being the palest. Juveniles and subadults have a number of red, vertical bars on their bodies. The king soldierbream has a maximum published total length of 80 cm (31 in) but 30 cm (12 in) is more typical.

== Distribution and habitat ==
Argyrops spinifer is found in the Indian Ocean but its exact distribution is difficult to determine as there are similar species and geographical forms. It is found over a variety of depths between 5 and 100 m (16 and 328 ft), with the juveniles and subadults preferring shallower, more protected waters.

== Biology ==
Argyrops spinifer is a predatory species, it largely hunts benthic invertebrates, particularly molluscs. The king soldierbream may be a protogynous hermaphrodite. In the Arabian Sea spawning was seen to take place between November and January, just after the end of the monsoon.

== Fisheries ==
Argyrops spinifer is an important species for recreational and commercial fisheries. They are caught using bottom trawls, handlines and fish traps, it has been studies for its potential in aquaculture in Oman.
