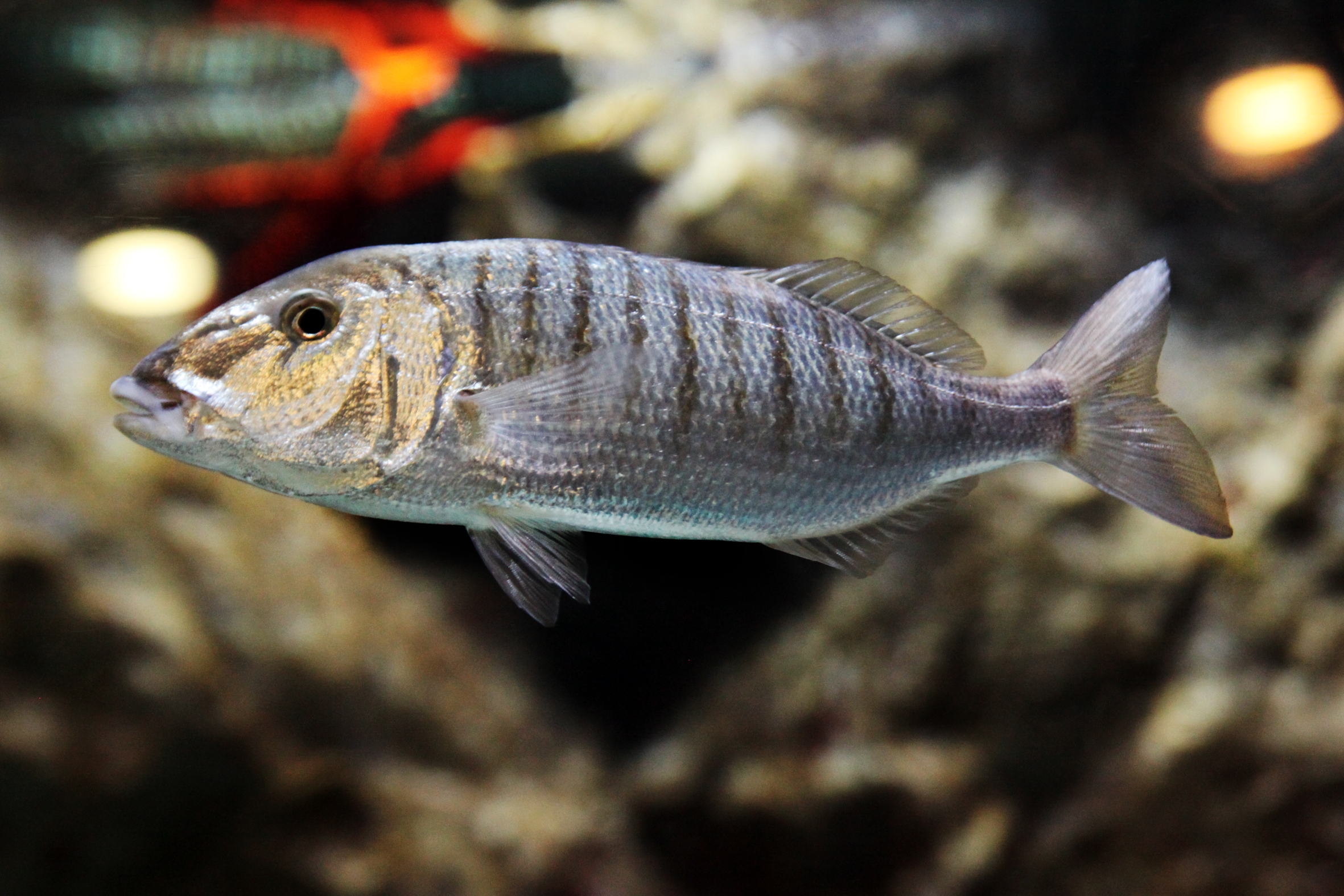

Conservation status
- Least Concern (IUCN 3.1)

Scientific classification
- Kingdom: Animalia
- Phylum: Chordata
- Class: Actinopterygii
- Order: Acanthuriformes
- Family: Sparidae
- Genus: Lithognathus
- Species: L. mormyrus

Binomial name
- Lithognathus mormyrus Linnaeus, 1758

Synonyms
- Pagellus goreensis Valenciennes, 1830; Pagellus mormyrus (Linnaeus, 1758); Sparus mormyrus Linnaeus, 1758

= Sand steenbras =

Species of fish

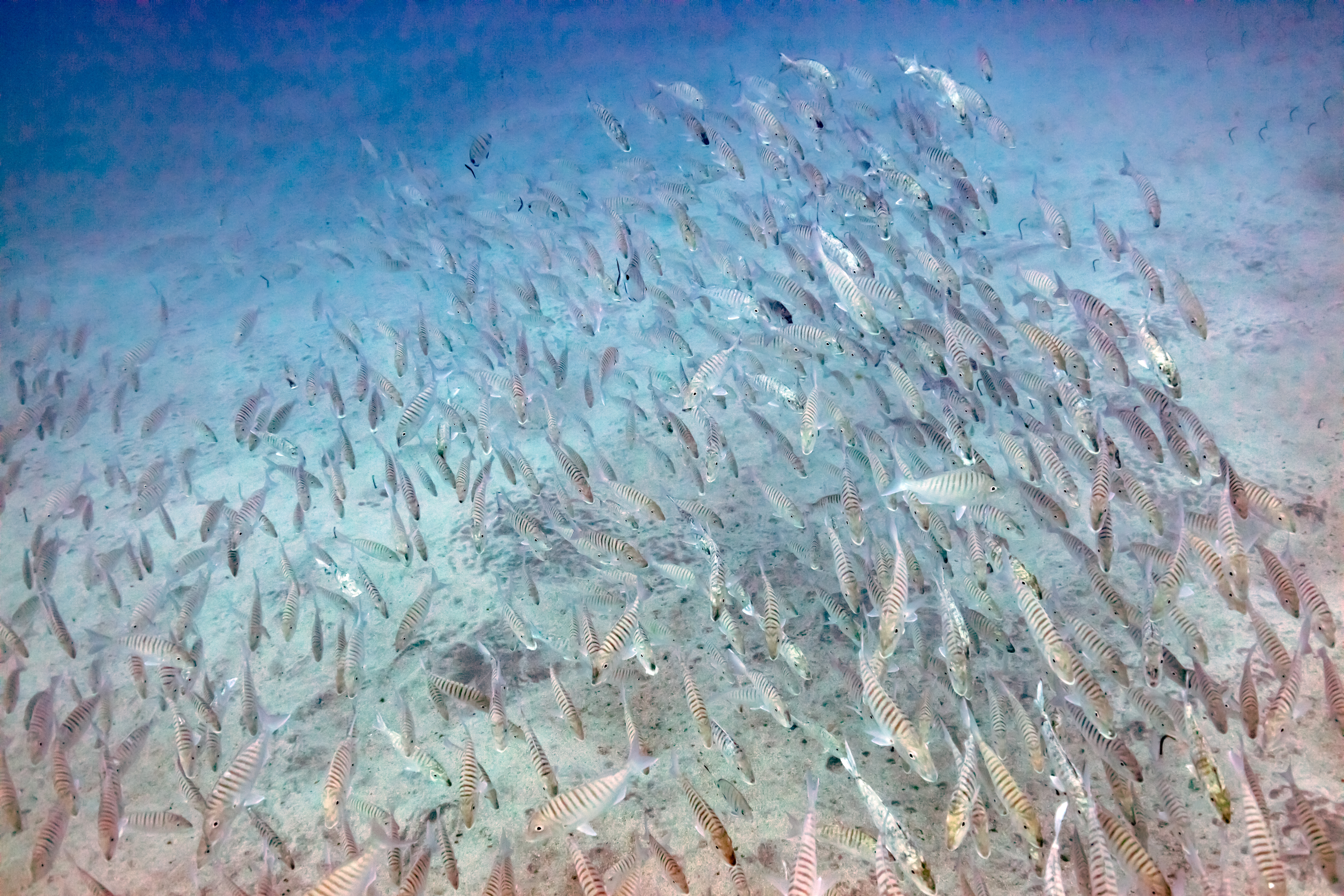
School of sand steenbras in Tenerife (Spain)

The sand steenbras or striped seabream (Lithognathus mormyrus) is a species of marine fish in the family Sparidae, colloquially known as the common bastardfish for nipping at the legs of swimmers. It is found in shallow water in the Mediterranean Sea and in the eastern Atlantic Ocean from France to South Africa. It also occurs in the Red Sea and off the coast of Mozambique in the Indian Ocean. The IUCN has assessed its conservation status as being of "least concern".

== Description ==
The sand steenbras is a moderately deep-bodied fish that can grow to a length of about 55 cm (22 in), with a weight of around 1 kg (2.2 lb), but a more common size is 30 cm (12 in). Its head is about as long as it is high and its upper profile is slightly convex. The dorsal fin has eleven spines and twelve to thirteen soft rays. The pectoral fin is shorter than the head and has fifteen to seventeen soft rays. The anal fin has three spines and ten to eleven soft rays. The head and body are silver, the body being marked with about fourteen vertical dark bands.

== Distribution and habitat ==
The species is widely distributed in shallow seas at depths down to about 150 m (492 ft). Its range includes the Mediterranean Sea, the Black Sea, the Sea of Azov, the eastern Atlantic Ocean from France southwards to South Africa, the Canary Islands, Madeira, the Cape Verde Islands, the Red Sea and the western Indian Ocean from Mozambique southwards to South Africa. It is found in estuaries and bays over sandy and muddy seabeds and sea grass meadows.

== Ecology ==
The sand steenbras feeds mainly on invertebrates which it picks off the seabed. Its diet includes gastropod molluscs, bivalve molluscs, polychaete worms, crabs, amphipods, copepods, sea urchins and small fish. It is gregarious and sometimes forms large schools.

As a protandric hermaphrodite, the sand steenbras starts its adult life as a male and later changes its sex to female. In the Mediterranean Sea it reaches maturity as a male at age two, at a length of about 14 cm (6 in), and changes sex at age four to seven at a length of about 21 to 28 cm (8 to 11 in).

This fish is caught for human consumption throughout most of its range but is not in general a targeted species due to its small size. The International Union for Conservation of Nature has assessed its conservation status as being of "least concern".
