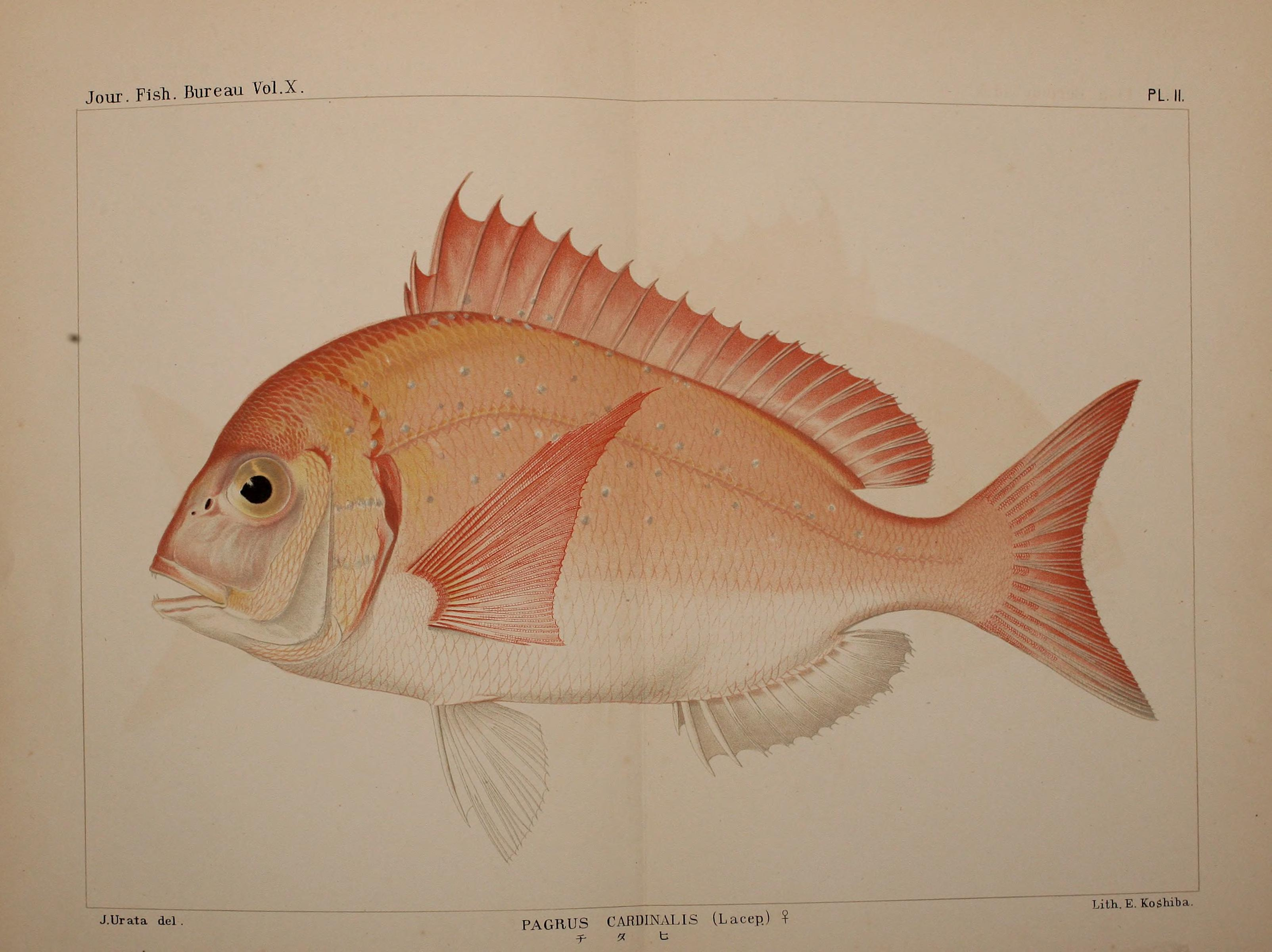

Conservation status
- Endangered (IUCN 3.1)

Scientific classification
- Kingdom: Animalia
- Phylum: Chordata
- Class: Actinopterygii
- Order: Acanthuriformes
- Family: Sparidae
- Genus: Evynnis
- Species: E. cardinalis

Binomial name
- Evynnis cardinalis (Lacépède, 1802)

Synonyms
- Sparus cardinalis Lacépède, 1802; Pagrus cardinalis (Lacépède, 1802)

= Evynnis cardinalis =

Species of fish

Evynnis cardinalis, the threadfin porgy or cardinal seabream, is a species of marine ray-finned fish belonging to the family Sparidae, which includes the seabreams and porgies. This fish is found in the Western Pacific Ocean off the coasts of Eastern Asia. It is an important food fish but is classified by the IUCN as Endangered.

== Taxonomy ==
Evynnis cardinalis was first formally described as Sparus cardinalis by the French naturalist Bernard Germain de Lacépède with its type locality given as China and Japan. In 1912 the American ichthyologists David Starr Jordan and William Francis Thompson proposed a new monospecific genus, Evynnis, with S. cardinalis as its only species and as the designated type species of the genus. This genus is placed in the family Sparidae within the order Spariformes by the 5th edition of Fishes of the World. Some authorities classify this genus in the subfamily Sparidae, but the 5th edition of Fishes of the World does not recognise subfamilies within the Sparidae.

== Etymology ==
Evynnis cardinalis has the specific name cardinalis, meaning "red", an allusion to the pale red or pinkish colour of the fish.

== Description ==
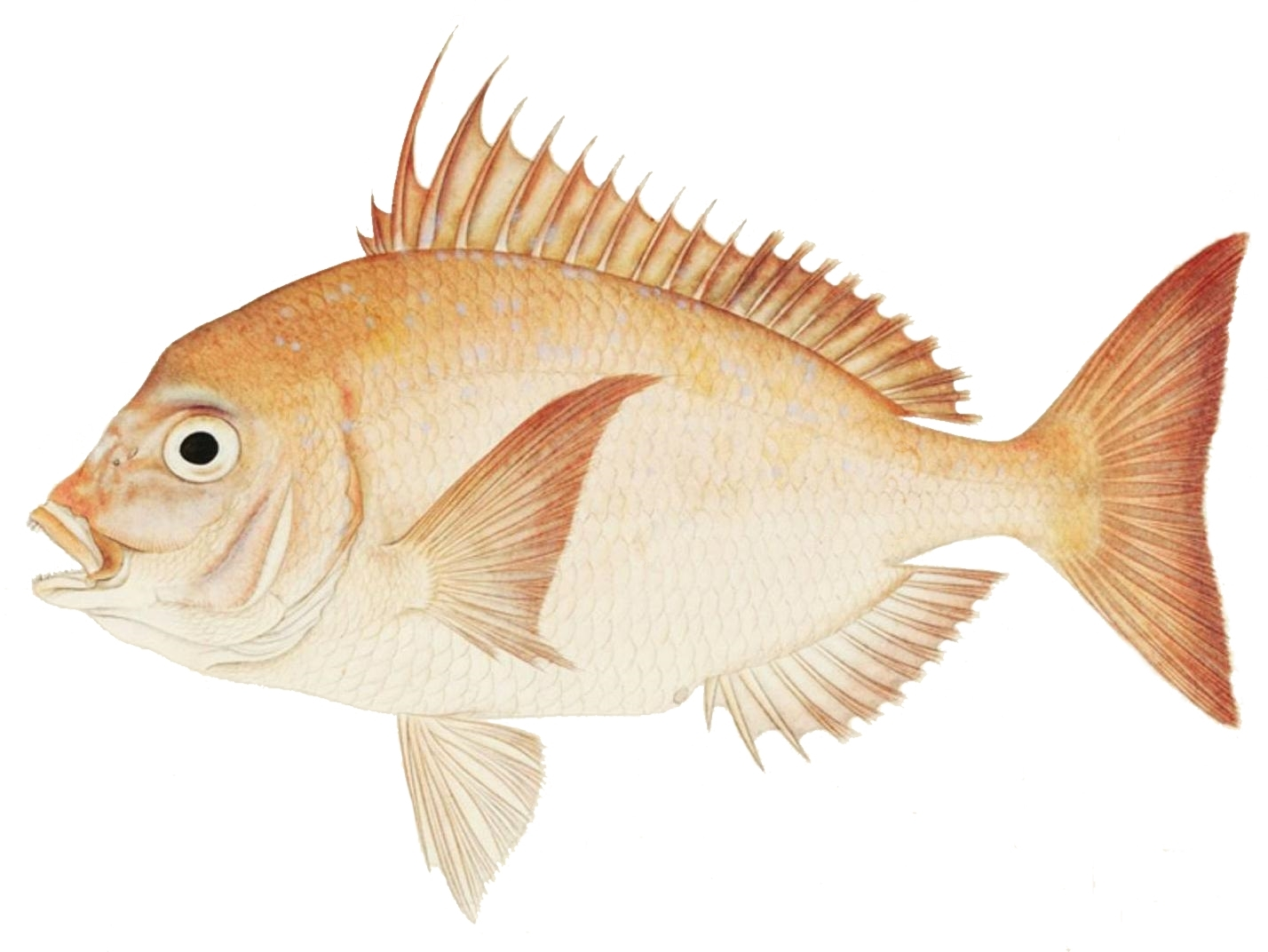
Evynnis cardinalis

Evynnis cardinalis has a robust, strongly compressed body which is deeper than its head. The upper profile of the head is oblique, frequently showing a bulge near the eyes. This species has its dorsal fin supported by 12 spines, the third and fourth spines being elongated and filamentous, and 11 or 12 soft rays, while the anal fin is supported by 3 spines and 9 soft rays. The caudal fin is forked. The number of scale rows between lateral the line and the fourth dorsal-fin spine is typically 6.5, although it is infrequently 5.5. There are no teeth on the vomer. The overall colour of the body in life is red with silver tints and irregular blue spots along the flanks. This species has a maximum published total length of 40 cm (16 in) although 20 cm (7.9 in) is more typical.

== Distribution and habitat ==
Evynnis cardinalis is found in the northwest Pacific Ocean where it has been recorded from China, Japan and Korea south to Vietnam and Indonesia. It is mainly found at depths between 30 and 60 m (98 and 197 ft) bur can be found as deep as 100 m (330 ft)over a number of different substrates but it is commonest over reefs and rough areas of seabed.

== Biology ==
Evynnis cardinalis, as studied in the Beibu Gulf, starts to develop gonads in November with spawning taking place in December to February. The population concentrates in the northern part gulf, close to Hainan, to spawn. In April, spent fish are found mostly in the north-eastern gulf, while the juveniles move into nearshore, shallow waters in the north-eastern gulf. These juveniles reached a mean length of 5 cm (2.0 in) by May and in July these migrated southwestwards, becoming numerous throughout the Gulf. By October, the juveniles had largely moved into deeper waters.

== Fisheries and conservation ==
Evynnis cardinalis is an important target species for commercial fisheries and in Taiwan wild caught juveniles are raised in mariculture. The species is threatened by overfishing and in some areas, such as the Beibu Gulf there has been a significant decline in the population and the stock appears to have collapsed. The threadfin bream has life history characteristics that make it vulnerable to overfishing, such as longevity and late maturity. It is thought that over three generations (39 years) the population has suffered at least 50% declined, this is based on the rapid declines observed over shorter periods, these are made worse by the life history characteristics of this species mentioned above. The IUCN has, therefore classified E, cardinalis as Endangered.
