= Bulldog dentex =

Conservation status
- Least Concern (IUCN 3.1)

Scientific classification
- Kingdom: Animalia
- Phylum: Chordata
- Class: Actinopterygii
- Order: Acanthuriformes
- Family: Sparidae
- Genus: Virididentex; Poll, 1971
- Species: V. acromegalus

Binomial name
- Virididentex acromegalus (Osório, 1911)

Synonyms
- Species synonymy: Dentex acromegalus Osório, 1911; Sparus acromegalus (Osório, 1911)

Species of fish

The bulldog dentex (Virididentex acromegalus) is a species of marine ray-finned fish belonging to the family Sparidae, which includes the seabreams and porgies. The bulldog dentex is the only species in the monospecific genus Virididentex and it is endemic to Cape Verde.

== Taxonomy ==
The bulldog dentex was first formally described in 1911 as Dentex acromegalus by the Portuguese biologist Balthazar Osório with its type locality given as Ilha de Santo Antão in Cape Verde. In 1971 Max Poll reclassified this species in the monotypic genus Virididentex. This taxon is classified in the family Sparidae within the order Spariformes by the 5th edition of Fishes of the World. Some authorities classify this genus in the subfamily Denticinae, but the 5th edition of Fishes of the World does not recognise subfamilies within the Sparidae.

== Etymology ==
The bulldog dentex has the genus name Virididentex combines viridis, meaning "green", with Dentex, the genus it was proposed as a subgenus of, the green part almost certainly refers to Cape Verde. The specific name acromegalus combines acro meaning "at the tip", and megalus, meaning "large", Osório did not explain this allusion, it mat refer to the protruding lower jaw.

== Description ==
The bulldog dentex has an oblong compressed body, the dorsal profile of the head is convex at the nape and concave in front of the eyes. The eye is relatively small in size which has a diameter obviously less than the length of the snout. The scales on the crown extend froward beyond the front margin of the eyes. The oblique mouth has a protruding lower jaw. The teeth are canine-like and are arranged in several rows with the outermost row being the largest. The dorsal fin is supported by 11 spines, the fourth or fifth spine being the longest, and 11 soft rays and the anal fin has 3 spines and 8 or 9 soft rays, the last ray on both these fins is long and filamentous. There is a wide flattened spine in the pelvic fins which also have an obvious axillary scale. The overall colour is uniform brownish with reddish, greenish or bluish tints, paler on the bellu and with reddish fins. This species a maximum published total length of 52 cm (20 in), although 30 cm (12 in) is more typical.

== Distribution and habitat ==
The bulldog dentex is endemic to Cape Verde where it is found at depths between 40 and 60 m (130 and 200 ft) over rocky substrates.
