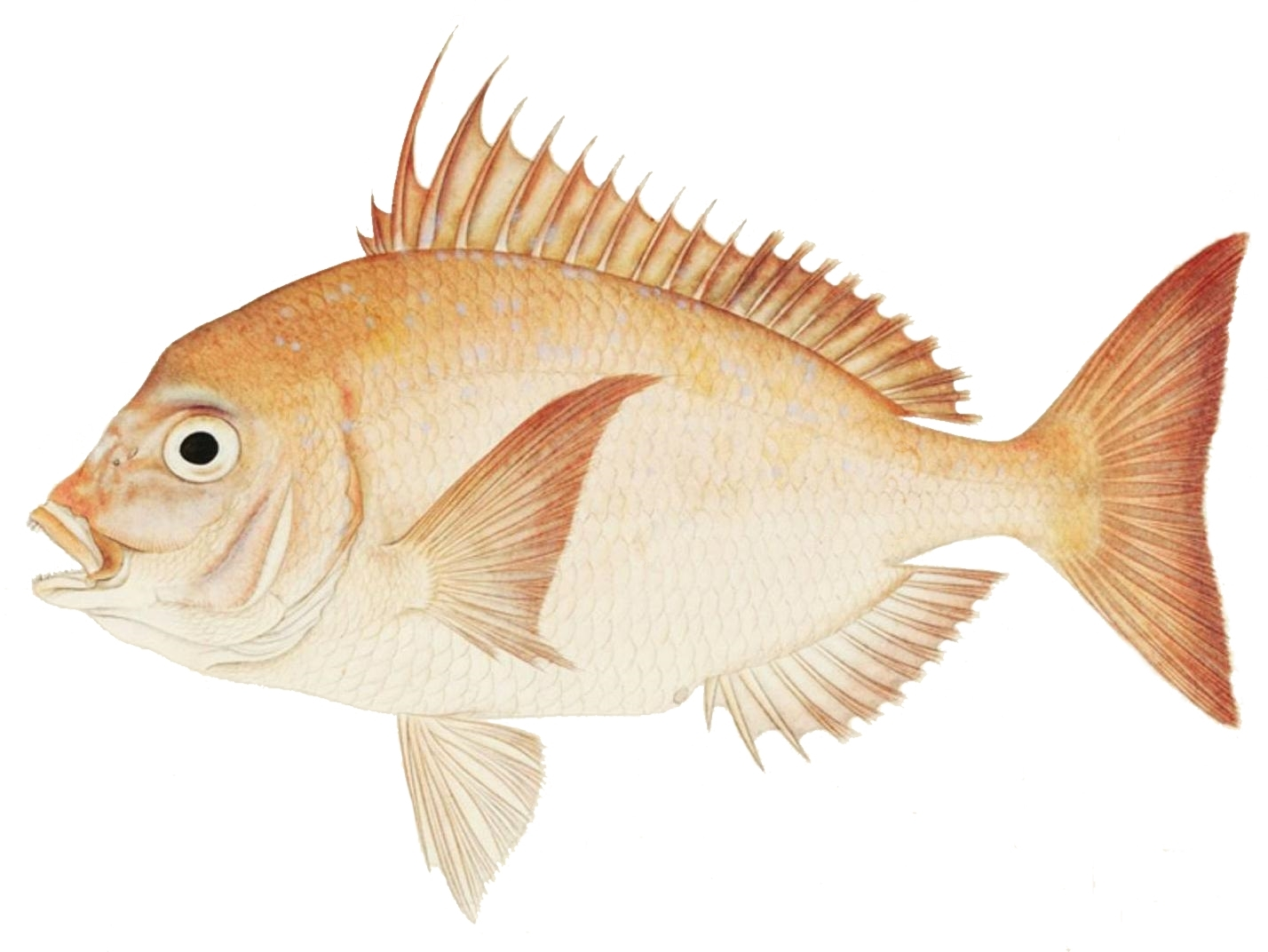
- Threadfin porgy (Evynnis cardinalis)

Scientific classification
- Kingdom: Animalia
- Phylum: Chordata
- Class: Actinopterygii
- Division: Teleostei
- Order: Acanthuriformes
- Family: Sparidae
- Genus: Evynnis; D. S. Jordan & W. F. Thompson, 1912

Type species
- Sparus cardinalis Lacépède, 1802

= Evynnis =

Genus of fishes

Evynnis is a genus of marine ray-finned fishes belonging to the family Sparidae, which includes the seabreams and porgies. The genus comprises 4 species, 3 in the Western Pacific Ocean and 1 in the Eastern Atlantic Ocean.

== Taxonomy ==
Evynnis was first proposed as a genus in 1912 by the American ichthyologists David Starr Jordan and William Francis Thompson with Sparus cardinalis, its only species, designated as its type species. Sparus cardinalis was first formally described in 1802 by Bernard Germain de Lacépède from China and Japan. This genus is placed in the family Sparidae within the order Spariformes by the 5th edition of Fishes of the World. Some authorities classify this genus in the subfamily Sparinae, but the 5th edition of Fishes of the World does not recognise subfamilies within the Sparidae.

== Etymology ==
Evynnis combines eu, meaning “well”, and hynnis, which means “vomer”, an allusion to the conical teeth on the head of the vomer.

== Species ==
Evynnis contains the following 4 valid species:

- Evynnis cardinalis (Lacépède, 1802) (Threadfin porgy)
- Evynnis ehrenbergii (Valenciennes, 1830)
- Evynnis mononematos Guan, Tang & Wu, 2012
- Evynnis tumifrons (Temminck & Schlegel 1843) (Yellowback seabream)

== Characteristics ==
Evynnis seabreams have molar-like teeth in the sides of the jaws. The area between the eyes is scaled, the third and fourth dorsal fin spines are well developed and elongated into filaments. They have 9 spines in the anal fin. However, it has been noted by workers that a new review and description of the genus is required. The largest species of Evynnis is E. ehrenbergii with a maximum published total length of 43 cm (17 in).

== Distribution ==
Evynnis seabreams are found in the Western Pacific Ocean in Eastern Asia, where 3 species are found, and one species, E. ehrenbergii, in the eastern Atlantic off the Coast of West Africa and the Mediterranean.
