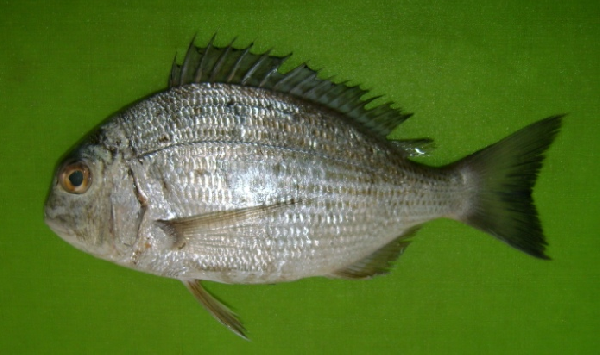

Conservation status
- Least Concern (IUCN 3.1)

Scientific classification
- Kingdom: Animalia
- Phylum: Chordata
- Class: Actinopterygii
- Order: Acanthuriformes
- Family: Sparidae
- Genus: Crenidens
- Species: C. crenidens

Binomial name
- Crenidens crenidens (Forsskål, 1775)

Synonyms
- Sparus crenidens Forsskål, 1775; Crenidens forskalii Valenciennes, 1830

= Crenidens crenidens =

Species of fish

Crenidens crenidens, the karanteen seabream or karanteen, is a species of ray-finned fish from the sea bream family Sparidae which was described by the Swedish zoologist Peter Forsskål in 1775. It is native to the western Indian Ocean but has colonised the eastern Mediterranean Sea since 1970. It is one of only three species in genus Crenidens, the others being the little known Crenidens macracanthus and the partially sympatric C. indicus.

== Taxonomy ==
Crenidens crenidens was first formally described as Sparus crenidens in 1775 by the Swedish-speaking Finnish explorer and naturalist Peter Forsskål with its type localites given as Jeddah the Red Sea in Saudi Arabia and the Gulf of Suez and Red Sea in Egypt. In 1830 Achille Valenciennes proposed the monospecific genus Crenidens for this species but unnecessarily renamed Sparus crenidens, Crenidens forsskalii. This species is, therefor, the type species of Crenidens by monotypy. The genus Crenidens is placed in the family Sparidae within the order Spariformes by the 5th edition of Fishes of the World. Some authorities classify this genus in the subfamily Boopsinae, but the 5th edition of Fishes of the World does not recognise subfamilies within the Sparidae.

There were two generally recognised subspecies:

- C. c. crenidens (Forsskål, 1775) which occurs in the Red Sea and southwards along the eastern African coast;
- C. c. indicus Day 1873 which extends from the Red Sea to the Persian Gulf and Nicobar Islands.

The two taxa occur sympatrically in the Red Sea. Recent work has supported the raising of C.c. indicus to species level once more and that a third species which is currently regarded as a junior synonym of C.c. indicus, Crenidens macracanthus, known from only two specimens from the Arabian Sea, is a separate valid species.

== Description ==
Crenidens crenidens has an oblong to ovoid shaped body which is slightly compressed. Smaller adults, less than 19.7 cm in length, show a nose like bump in front of the eye. The mouth extends back to the anterior nostril and there are three rows of teeth in each jaw, the upper front jaw has 8-9 brown-tipped incisor like teeth, each bearing five denticulations which give the edge of the teeth a wavy appearance. The inner rows have a few teeth of similar form but the other teeth are granular. The scales finely ctenoid, the scaly cheeks contrasting with the scaleless interorbital region. The dorsal fin has eleven each of spiny and soft rays, while the anal fin has three spiny and ten soft rays. The caudal fin is forked. There are 52-60 scales making up the lateral line.

C. crenidens is silvery greenish-blue or olive in colour with darker narrow longitudinal stripes created by dark spots on the scales which are above the level of pectoral fins; the fins are coloured dull yellowish or olive with a dark margin on the dorsal fin and infrequently the axil pectoral fin shows darkish axils. They can grow to 30 cm in length in their native range, although the maximum in the Mediterranean is 20 cm, the more usual measurement is between 10 and 16 cm in length.

== Distribution ==
Crenidens crenidens is indigenous to the western Indian Ocean from the Red Sea south along the coast of eastern Africa South Africa and has been also reported from southern Madagascar. In 1970 it was recorded for the first time in the Mediterranean in the Bardawil Lagoon (northern Egypt) and has since spread to Israel and to Libya. The most likely route for this species to have followed to colonise the Mediterranean is through the Suez Canal.

== Biology ==
Crenidens crenidens is found in shallow coastal water, over sandy substrates which are frequently covered with sea grass. Its main food is algae but it also feeds on smaller invertebrates, such as crustaceans and worms. The eggs and larvae are planktonic. Off the Libyan coast C. crenidens has developed a distinct breeding season from November to February and the fish move away from the coast to spawn elsewhere in March and April. The males attain sexual maturity at 14 cm length and some females reach maturity at around 13 cm to 13.9 cm but for 50% of females maturity occurs at around 15.4 cm length. Fecundity is dependent on the weight of the female and varies from 678 eggs in smaller females to 9,888 eggs.

== Uses ==
Crenidens crenidens is caught all year round in the northern Indian Ocean using trammel nets and beach seines and is consumed fresh, however, in the southern part of that Ocean it is fished mainly for bait.
