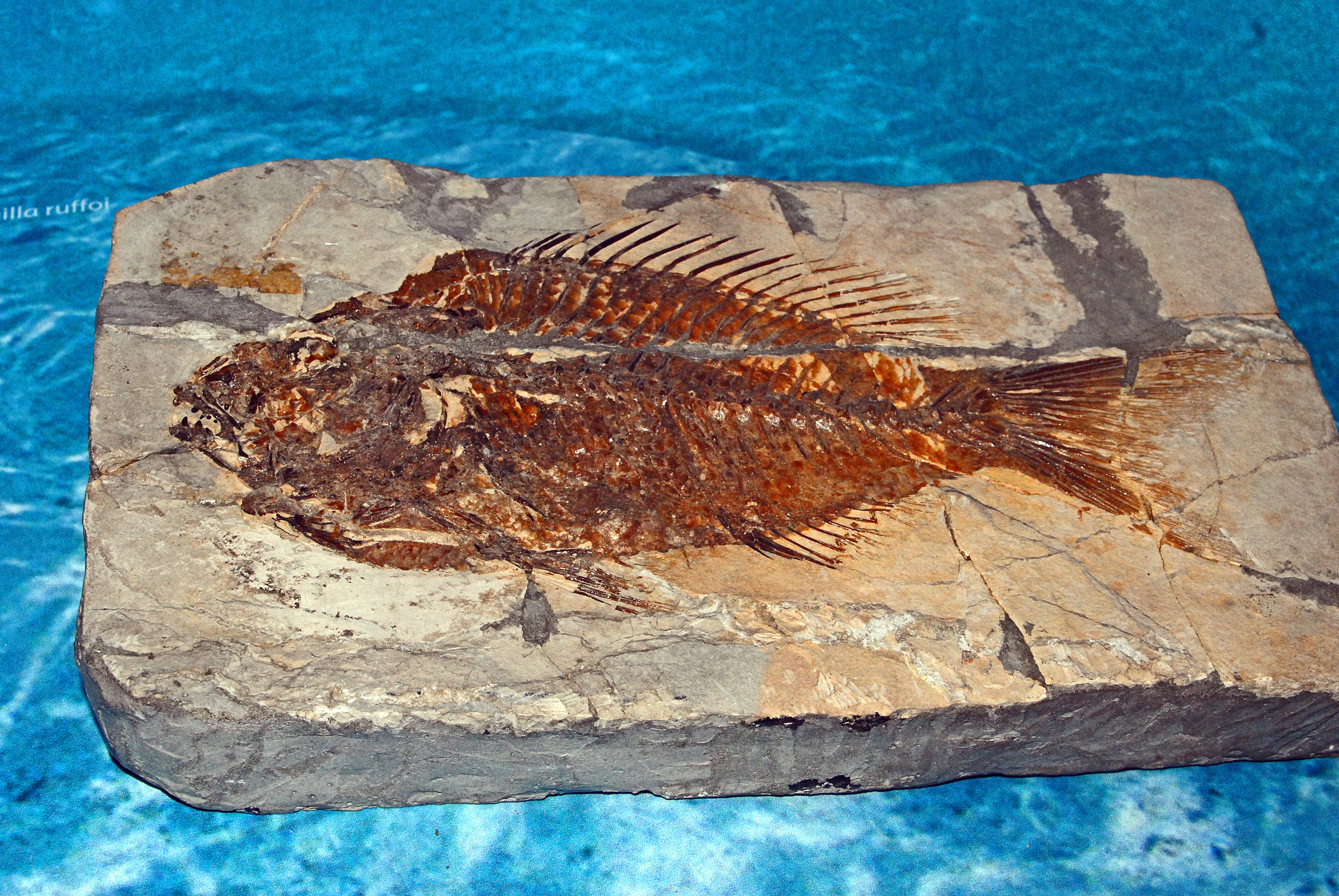
- Sparnodus vulgaris

Scientific classification
- Kingdom: Animalia
- Phylum: Chordata
- Class: Actinopterygii
- Order: Acanthuriformes
- Family: Sparidae
- Genus: †Sparnodus; Agassiz, 1839

Species
- See text

= Sparnodus =

Sparnodus Temporal range: Cenozoic

Extinct genus of fishes

Sparnodus is an extinct genus of prehistoric perciform fish in the family Sparidae. Species of this genus were nektonic carnivores. These fishes lived in the Cenozoic Era, in the Oligocene and Paleocene (55.8 to 23.03 Ma).

== Species ==
- †Sparnodus altivelis
- †Sparnodus elongatus
- †Sparnodus macrophthalmus
- †Sparnodus micracanthus
- †Sparnodus ovalis
- †Sparnodus vulgaris

== Description ==
These medium-sized fishes usually could reach a length of 30 centimetres (12 in). They had a laterally compressed body, quite gibbous in the forepart, with a single dorsal fin, well developed and supported by strong spines. The anal fin was about half the length of the caudal one and was also equipped with spiny rays. Also the pectoral fins were long and well developed. The body was covered with large finely wrinkled scales. The mouth was small and had strong conical teeth. They had no palatal teeth nor protracted jaws.

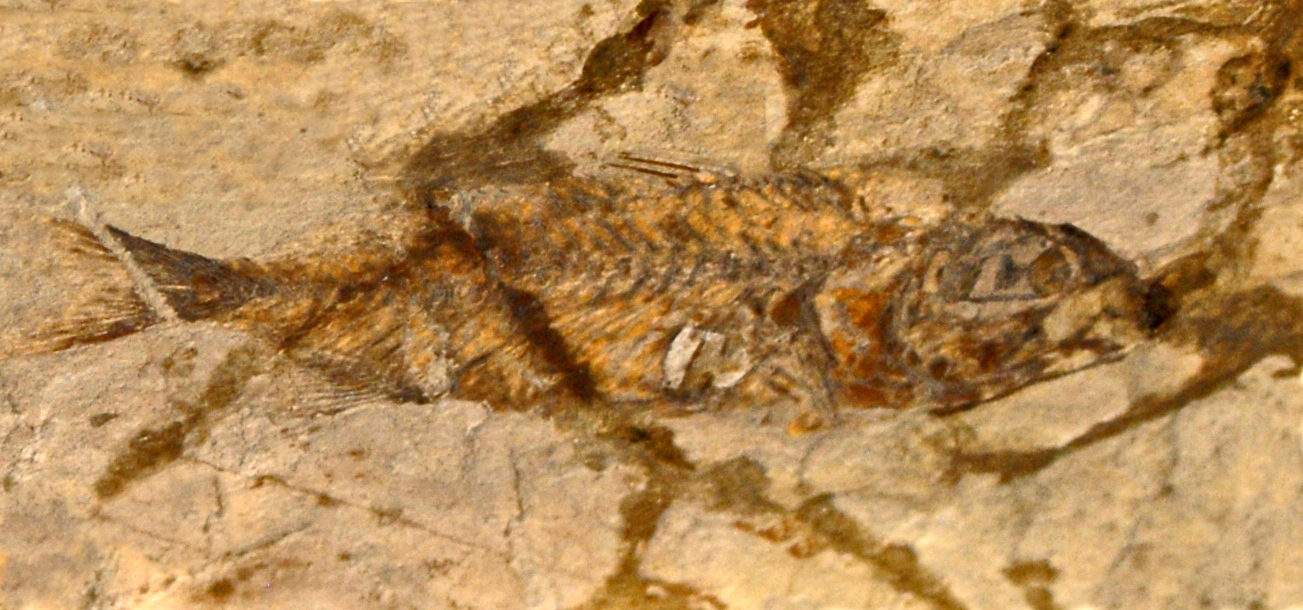
Fossil of Sparnodus elongatus from Monte Bolca

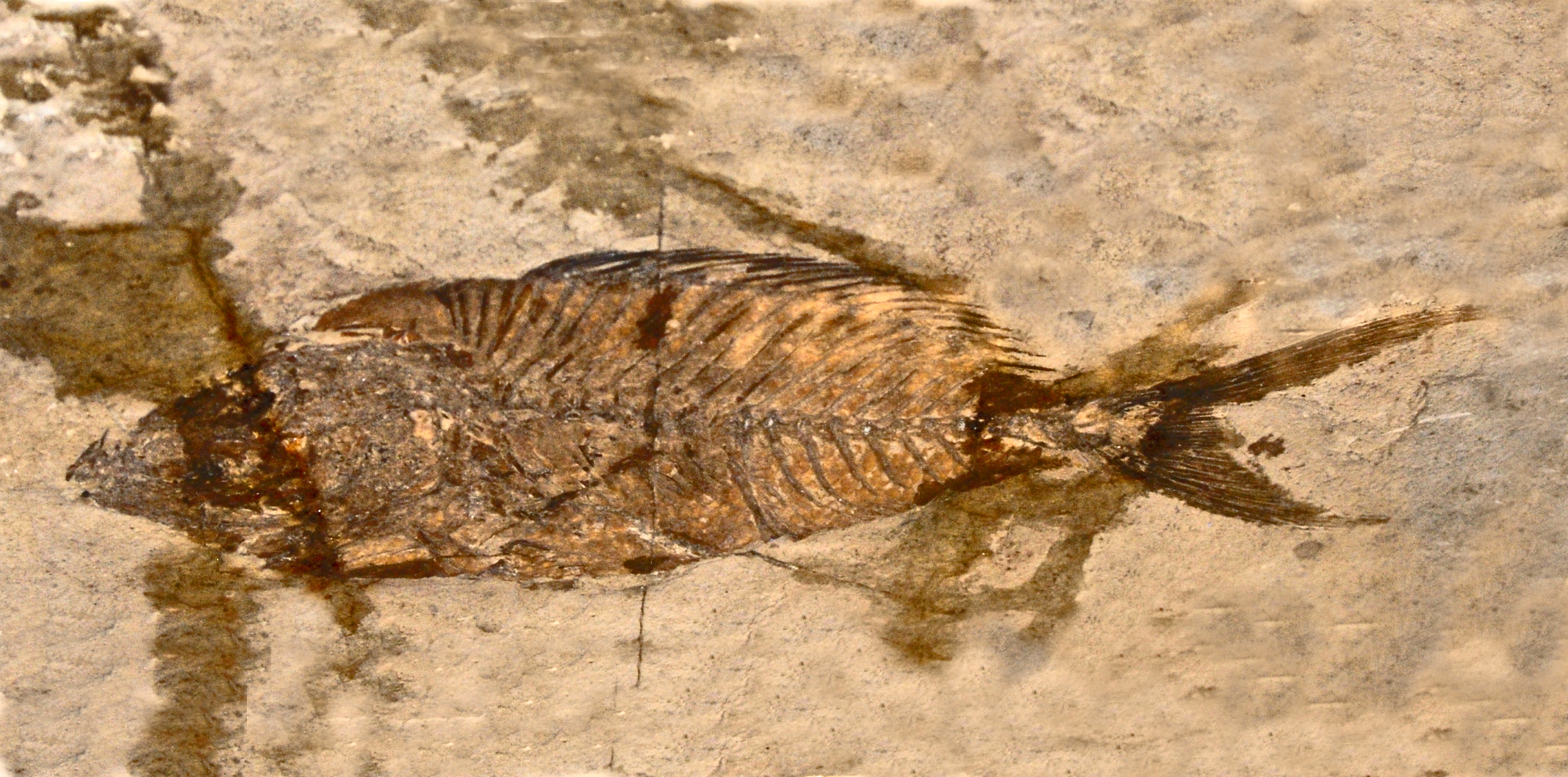
Fossil of Sparnodus macrophthalmus from Monte Bolca

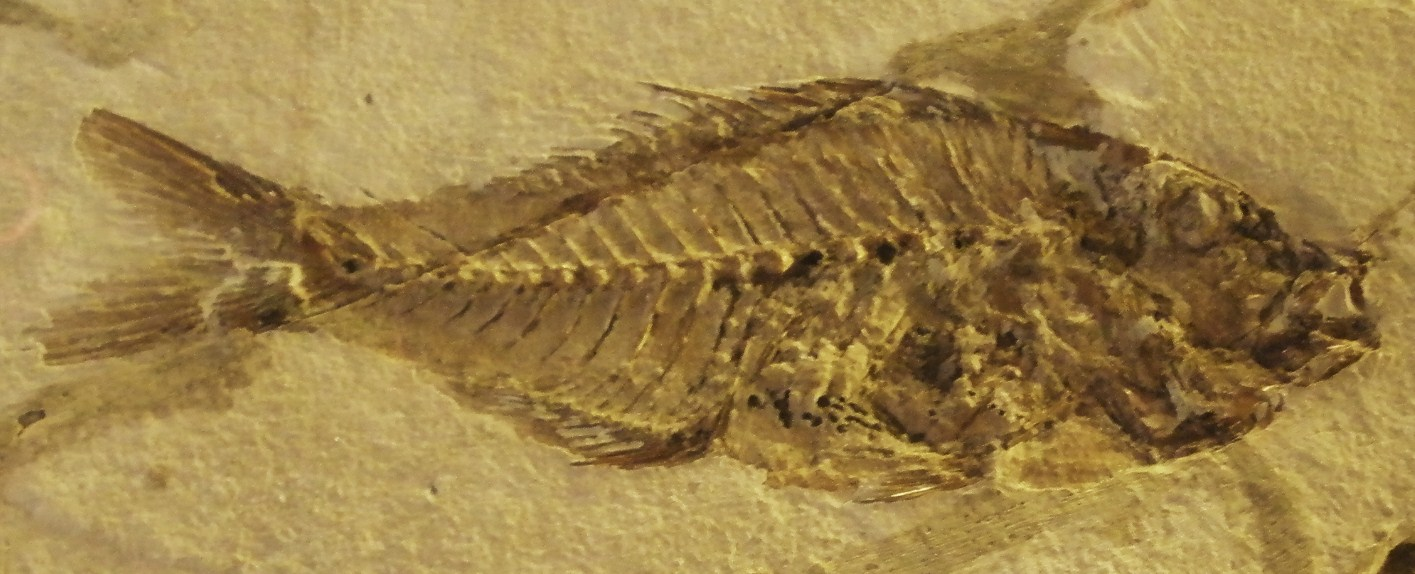
Fossil of Sparnodus micracanthus

== Bibliography ==
- Bannikov, A. 2006. Fishes from the Eocene of Bolca, northern Italy, previously classified in the Sparidae, Serranidae and Haemulidae (Perciformes). Geodiversitas, vol. 28, no2, pp. 249–275.
- Day J. J. 2002. Phylogenetic relationships of the Sparidae (Teleostei: Percoidei) and implications for convergent trophic evolution. Biological Journal of the Linnean Society 76: 269–301
- Day J. J. 2003. Evolutionary relationships of the Sparidae (Teleostei: Percoidei): integrating fossil and Recent data. Transactions of the Royal Society of Edinburgh: Earth Sciences 93: 333–353
- L. Agassiz. 1839. Recherches Sur Les Poissons Fossiles. Tome IV (livr. 13). Imprimerie de Petitpierre, Neuchatel 109–204

== See also ==
- Prehistoric fish
- List of prehistoric bony fish
