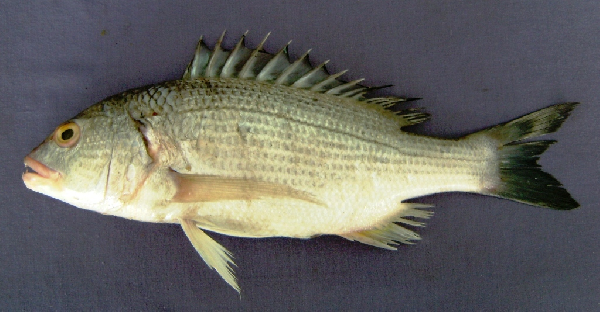
- Sparidentex hasta

Scientific classification
- Kingdom: Animalia
- Phylum: Chordata
- Class: Actinopterygii
- Order: Acanthuriformes
- Family: Sparidae
- Genus: Sparidentex; Munro, 1948

Type species
- Dentex hasta Valenciennes, 1830

= Sparidentex =

Genus of fishes

Sparidentex is a genus of ray-finned fish belonging to the family Sparidae, which includes the seabreams and porgies. These fishes are found in the Indian Ocean.

== Taxonomy ==
Sparidentex was first proposed as a monospecific genus in 1948 by the Australian marine biologist and ichthyologist Ian Stafford Ross Munro with Debtex hasta designated as the type species. Chrysophrys cuvieri was a name proposed by Francis Day in 1875 to replace Dentex hasta as the specific name hasta was secondarily preoccupied by Sparus hasta Bloch & Schneider, 1801 but C. cuvieri was an unnecessary new name as Bloch and Schnieders name was a junior synonym of Acanthopagrus berda. Valenciennes gave the type locality of D. hasta as Malabar in southwestern India. The genus Sparidentex is placed in the family Sparidae within the order Spariformes by the 5th edition of Fishes of the World. Some authorities classify this genus in the subfamily Sparinae, but the 5th edition of Fishes of the World does not recognise subfamilies within the Sparidae.

== Etymology ==
Sparidentex appears to be a portmanteau of the type genus of Sparidae, Sparus, and Dentex, the original genus of Sp. hasta. Munro did not explain the name.

== Species ==
Sparidentex contains 3 species recognised as valid:

- Sparidentex belayewi Hora & Misra, 1943
- Sparidentex hasta Valenciennes, 1830 (Sobaity seabream)
- Sparidentex jamalensis S. A. Amir, Siddiqui & Masroor, 2014 (Fanged seabream)

Sparidentex hasta is a very variable species and some authorities state that the genus needs a taxonomic review.

== Characteristics ==
Sparidentex seabreams are characterised by having an elongate body. They have a large mouth with the rear end of the maxilla being exposed and reaching a level of the centre of the eye. There are 6 large, canine-like at the front of both jaws, with an outer row of smaller canine-like teeth on the sides of the jaws, rows of brush like teeth and a row of very small molar-like teeth immediately inside the outer row, there are no large molars. The eyes are of intermediate size and have a diameter less than the length of the snout. The scales are cteniod and are of moderate size with those on the head do not reach as far forward as the centreline of the eyes. There are also no scales on the flange of the preoperculum. The soft-rayed parts of the dorsal and anal fins have scaly sheaths at their base.They are silvery fishes, darker and greyer above and paler below. The largest species of Sparidentex is S. hastawith a maximum published total length of 83 cm (33 in) while the other species are smaller with S. belaweyi having a maximum published standard length of 19.3 cm (7.6 in) and S. jamalensis having a maximum published standard length of 22.4 cm (8.8 in).

== Distribution ==
Sparidentex seabreams are found in the northern Indian Ocean from the Persian Gulf to the Bay of Bengal. There is a single record of S. hasta from the Swan River, near Perth, Western Australia, is thought to have been accidentally introduced there in ballast water from a ship.

== Fisheries ==
Sparidentex contains one species, S. hasta, which is highly valued as food fish in the Persian Gulf, used for celebratory meals, where it is caught by artisanal fishers using bottom trawls and line fishing. It is also a common species used in aquaculture in the Persian Gulf.
