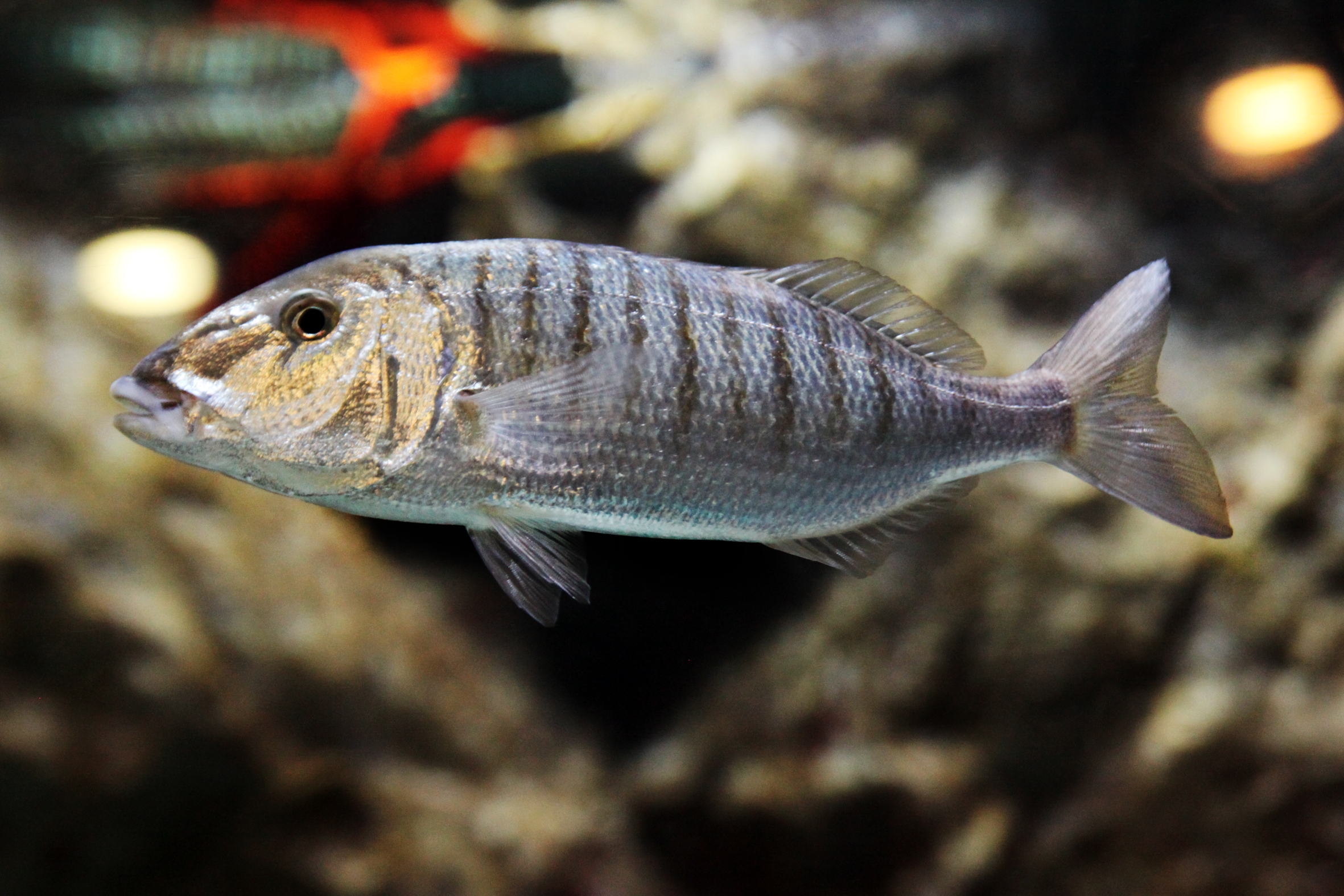
- Lithognathus mormyrus

Scientific classification
- Kingdom: Animalia
- Phylum: Chordata
- Class: Actinopterygii
- Order: Acanthuriformes
- Family: Sparidae
- Genus: Lithognathus; Swainson, 1839

Type species
- Lithognathus capensis Swainson, 1839

Species
- See text

Synonyms
- Pagrichthys Bleeker, 1859

= Lithognathus =

Lithognathus Temporal range: Miocene to Present

Genus of fishes

Lithognathus is a genus of marine ray-finned fish belonging to the family Sparidae, which includes the seabreams and porgies. Species in this genus are given the common name of steenbras. The genus is found in the Eastern Atlantic Ocean from southwestern Europe to South Africa and into the southwestern Indian Ocean.

== Taxonomy ==
Lithognathus was first proposed as taxon in 1839 by the English zoologist William Swainson, Swainson named it as a monotypic subgenus of Pagellus with Pagellus (Lithognathus) capensis as its only species and, therefore, its type species. Swainson's name is now understood to be a junior synonym of Pagrus lithognathus which had been described in 1829 by Georges Cuvier, with its type locality given as the Cape of Good Hope. The genus Lithognathus is placed in the family Sparidae within the order Spariformes by the 5th edition of Fishes of the World. Some authorities classify this genus in the subfamily Pagellinae, but the 5th edition of Fishes of the World does not recognise subfamilies within the Sparidae.

== Etymology ==
Lithognathus means "stone jaw", Swainson described the maxillaries as "thick, enlarged, and as hard as stone". It is not a tautonym as Swainson unnecessarily renamed Cuvier's Pagellus lithognathus as L. lithognathus.

== Species ==
The World Register of Marine Species lists the following four species :

- Lithognathus aureti Smith, 1962 (West coast seabream)
- Lithognathus lithognathus (Cuvier, 1829) (White steenbras)
- Lithognathus mormyrus (Linnaeus, 1758) (Sand steenbras)
- Lithognathus olivieri Penrith & Penrith, 1969 (Steenbras)

== Characteristics ==
Lithognathus steenbras breams are characterised by an oblong compressed, body with a long snout. The tips of the pectoral fins extend almost as far as the origin of the anal fin. The teeth in the front of the jaws are small and arranged in bands with between 3 and 6 rows of molar-like teeth in the upper jaw and between 2 and 4 rows in the lower jaw. In adults the maxilla does not extend as far as the anterior edge of the orbit, The scales on the head reach as far as the posterior edge of the orbit. The largest species in the genus is the white steenbras with a maximum published total length of 200 cm (79 in) while the smallest is the L. olivieri.

== Distribution ==
Lithognathus steenbras breams occur in the Eastern Atlantic Ocean from southwestern Europe to South Africa and into the southwestern Indian Ocean.
