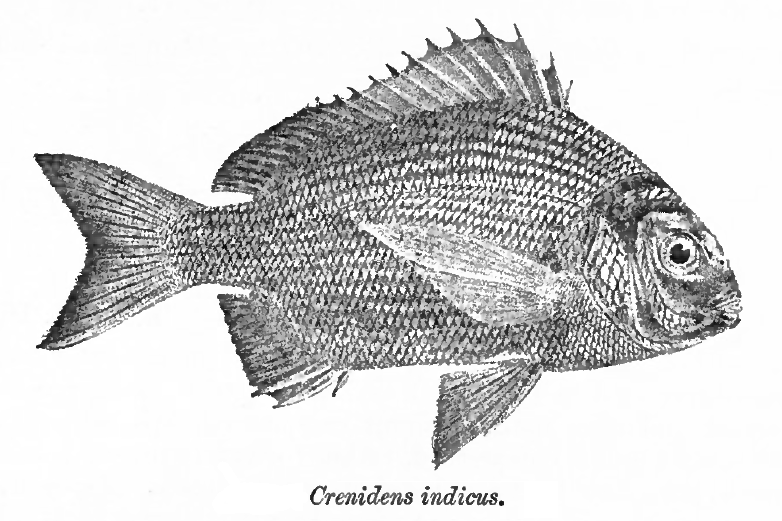
- Crenidens indicus

Conservation status
- Least Concern (IUCN 3.1)

Scientific classification
- Kingdom: Animalia
- Phylum: Chordata
- Class: Actinopterygii
- Order: Acanthuriformes
- Family: Sparidae
- Genus: Crenidens
- Species: C. indicus

Binomial name
- Crenidens indicus Day, 1873

= Crenidens indicus =

Species of ray-finned fish

Crenidens indicus. Day's karanteen bream, is a species of marine ray-finned fish belonging to the family Sparidae, which includes the seabreams and porgies. This species is found in the Indian Ocean.

== Taxonomy ==
Crenidens indicus was first formally described in 1873 by the English zoologist Francis Day with its type locality given as the northern Indian Ocean. This taxon was previously treated as a subspecies of Crenidens crenidens but was recognised as a valid species in 2013. The genus Crenidens is placed in the family Sparidae within the order Spariformes by the 5th edition of Fishes of the World. Some authorities classify this genus in the subfamily Boopsinae, but the 5th edition of Fishes of the World does not recognise subfamilies within the Sparidae.

== Description ==
Crenidens indicus has a dorsal fin which is supported by 11 spines and 11 soft rays while the anal fin contains3 spines and 10 soft rays. The shape of the body is a slightly compressed oblong oval which has a standard length which is 2.1 to 2.4 times its depth. The dorsal profile of the head is gently convex up to the origin of the dorsal fin but in adults it changes to concave behind the eyes and convex to the front of the eyes. The overall colour is silvery with greenish blue or olive-green tints. There are thin longitudinal stripes along the rows of scales. The fins are dull yellow and translucent. There is a dusky spot at the base of the pectoral fin. This species has a maximum published standard length of 23.1 cm (9.1 in).

== Distribution and habitat ==
Crenidens indicus is found in the northern Indian Ocean where it is found from Oman to Pakistan, and throughout the Persian Gulf. It has also been confirmed to occur off the western coast f India in Gujarat and off Mumbai. This species is typically encountered in shallow, sheltered coastal waters on mud substrates.
