= Parargyrops =

Scientific classification
- Kingdom: Animalia
- Phylum: Chordata
- Class: Actinopterygii
- Order: Acanthuriformes
- Family: Sparidae
- Genus: Parargyrops; Tanaka, 1916
- Species: P. edita

Binomial name
- Parargyrops edita Tanaka, 1916

Monospecific genus of ray-finned fish

Parargyrops is a monospecific genus of ray-finned fish belonging to the family Sparidae, which includes the seabreams and porgies. The only species in the genus is Parargyrops edita, the crimson seabream or red-fin pargo, which is found in the Western Pacific Ocean off East Asia.
