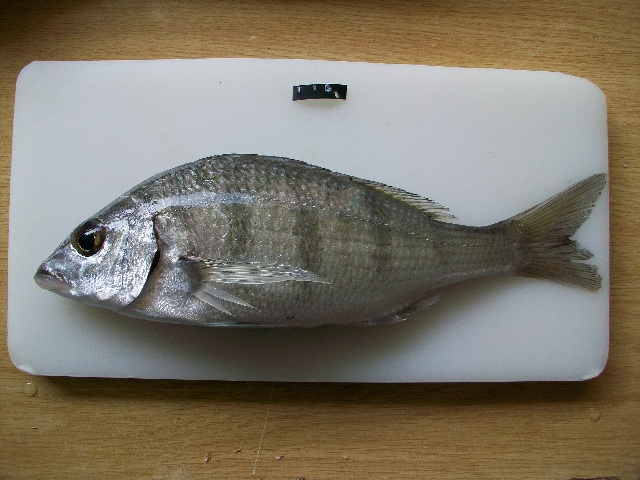

Conservation status
- Endangered (IUCN 3.1)

Scientific classification
- Kingdom: Animalia
- Phylum: Chordata
- Class: Actinopterygii
- Order: Acanthuriformes
- Family: Sparidae
- Genus: Lithognathus
- Species: L. lithognathus

Binomial name
- Lithognathus lithognathus (Cuvier, 1829)
- White steenbras distribution Extant (resident)

Synonyms
- Lithognathus capensis Swainson, 1839; Pagellus lithognathus (Cuvier, 1829); Pagrus lithognathus Cuvier, 1829

= White steenbras =

Species of fish from South Africa

The white steenbras (Lithognathus lithognathus) is a species of fish in the family Sparidae endemic to South Africa. Due to overfishing, primarily by seine netting operations in False Bay, the white steenbras is now endangered and is about to become a 'no keep' species in South Africa. Massive breeding shoals are illegally wiped out by beach seine netters each year, with the authorities doing little to prevent this. The species was identified as a priority for research, management and conservation in a National Linefish Status Report.
