= Paracalamus =

Paracalamus Temporal range: Upper Miocene

Scientific classification
- Domain: Eukaryota
- Kingdom: Animalia
- Phylum: Chordata
- Class: Actinopterygii
- Order: Perciformes
- Genus: †Paracalamus; Arambourg, 1927

Extinct genus of fishes

Paracalamus is an extinct genus of prehistoric bony fish that lived during the Upper Miocene subepoch.

== See also ==
- Prehistoric fish
- List of prehistoric bony fish
