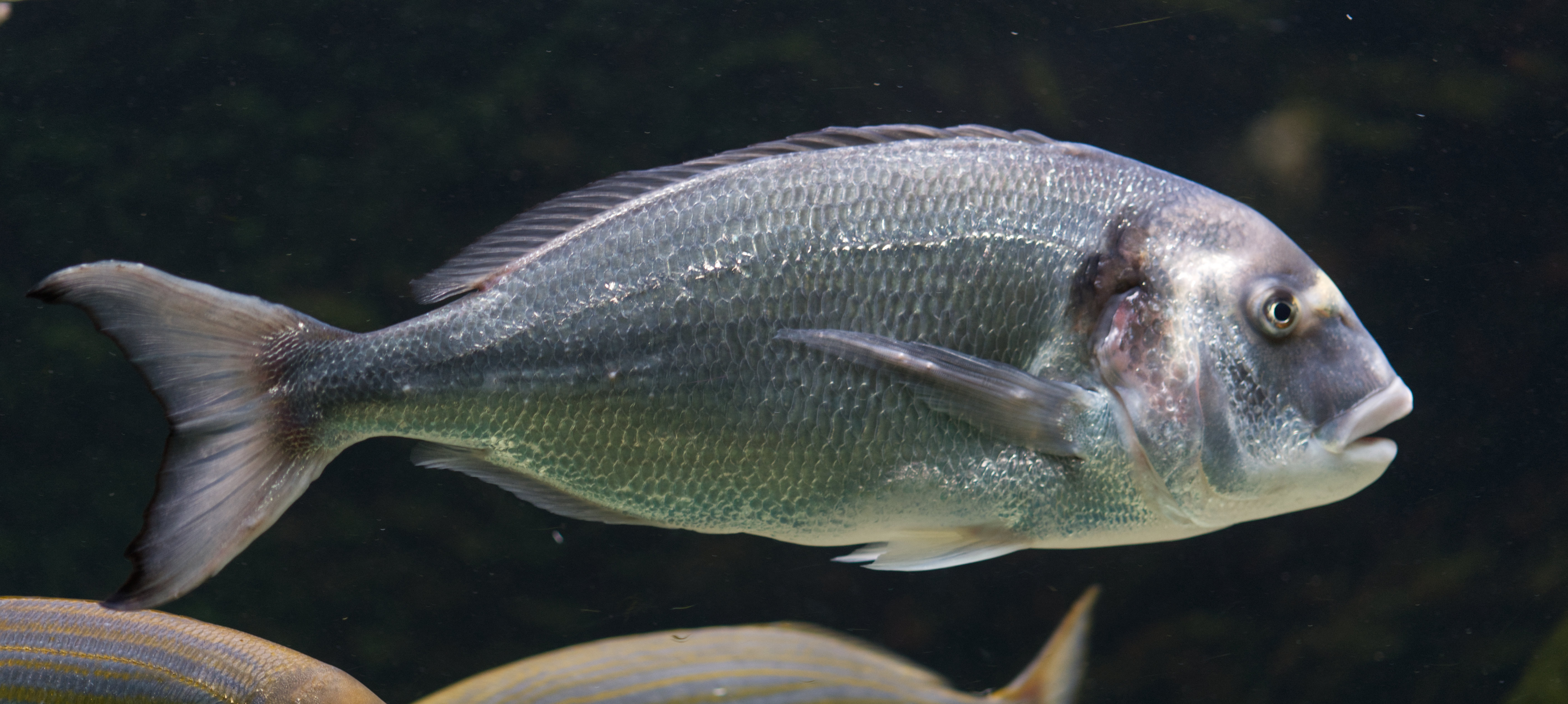
- Gilt-head bream (Sparus auratus)

Scientific classification
- Kingdom: Animalia
- Phylum: Chordata
- Class: Actinopterygii
- Division: Teleostei
- Order: Acanthuriformes
- Family: Sparidae; Rafinesque, 1810

Genera
- see text

Synonyms
- Centracanthidae Gill, 1893; Denticidae

= Sparidae =

Sparidae Temporal range: Early Eocene to present

Family of fishes

Sparidae, the seabreams and porgies, is a family of ray-finned fishes belonging to the order Acanthuriformes, although they were previously classified in the order Perciformes. The over 150 species are found in shallow and deep marine waters in temperate through tropical regions around the world. Most species are demersal carnivores.

== Taxonomy ==
Sparidae was first proposed as a family in 1818 by the French polymath and naturalist Constantine Samuel Rafinesque. Traditionally the taxa within the Spariformes were classified within the Perciformes, with some authorities using the term "Sparoid lineage" for the families Centracanthidae, Nemipteridae, Lethrinidae and Sparidae. Since then the use of molecular phylogenetics in more modern classifications has meant that the Spariformes is recognised as a valid order within the Percomorpha containing six families, with Callanthidae, Sillaginidae and Lobotidae included. Other workers have found that the Centracanthidae is synonymous with Sparidae and that the Spariformes contains only the remaining three families of the "Sparoid lineage".

In the past workers recognised six subfamilies within the Sparidae. These were Boopsinae, Denticinae, Diplodinae, Pagellinae, Pagrinae and Sparinae. However, these taxa did not resolve as monophyletic in all the analyses undertaken. These analyses support Sparidae as a monophyletic family if Spicara, a genus formerly in the family Centracanthidae, was included. This meant that Spicara and Centracanthus were both now classified within Sparidae, so that Centracanthidae is a junior synonym of Sparidae.

== Etymology ==
Sparidae takes its name from its type genus, Sparus, that name coming from the Greek for its only species the gilt-head bream (Sparus aurata).

== Genera ==
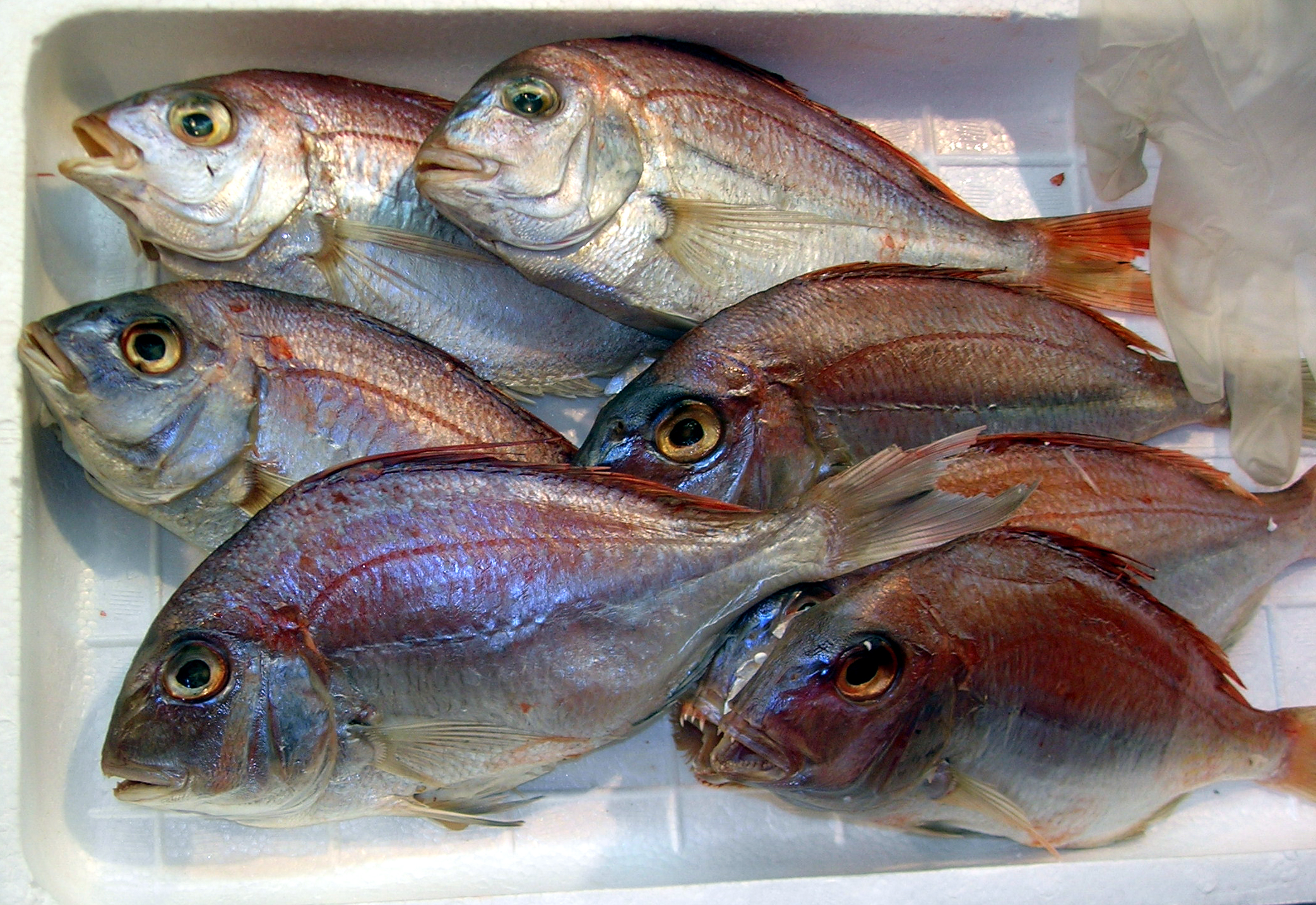
Pagrus major, or madai, is an important food fish in Japan.

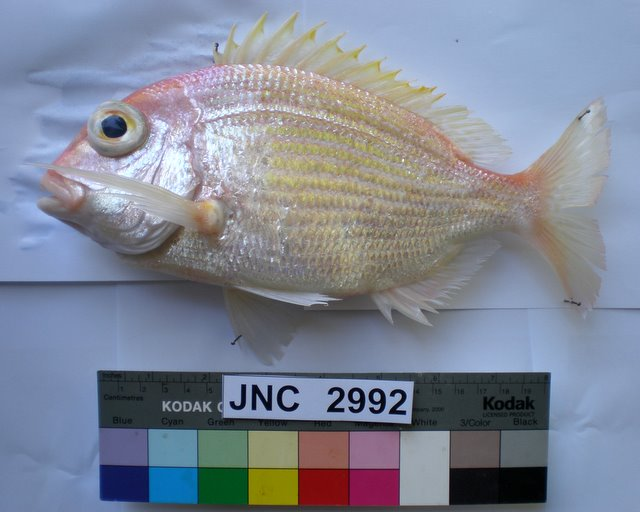
Dentex fourmanoiri

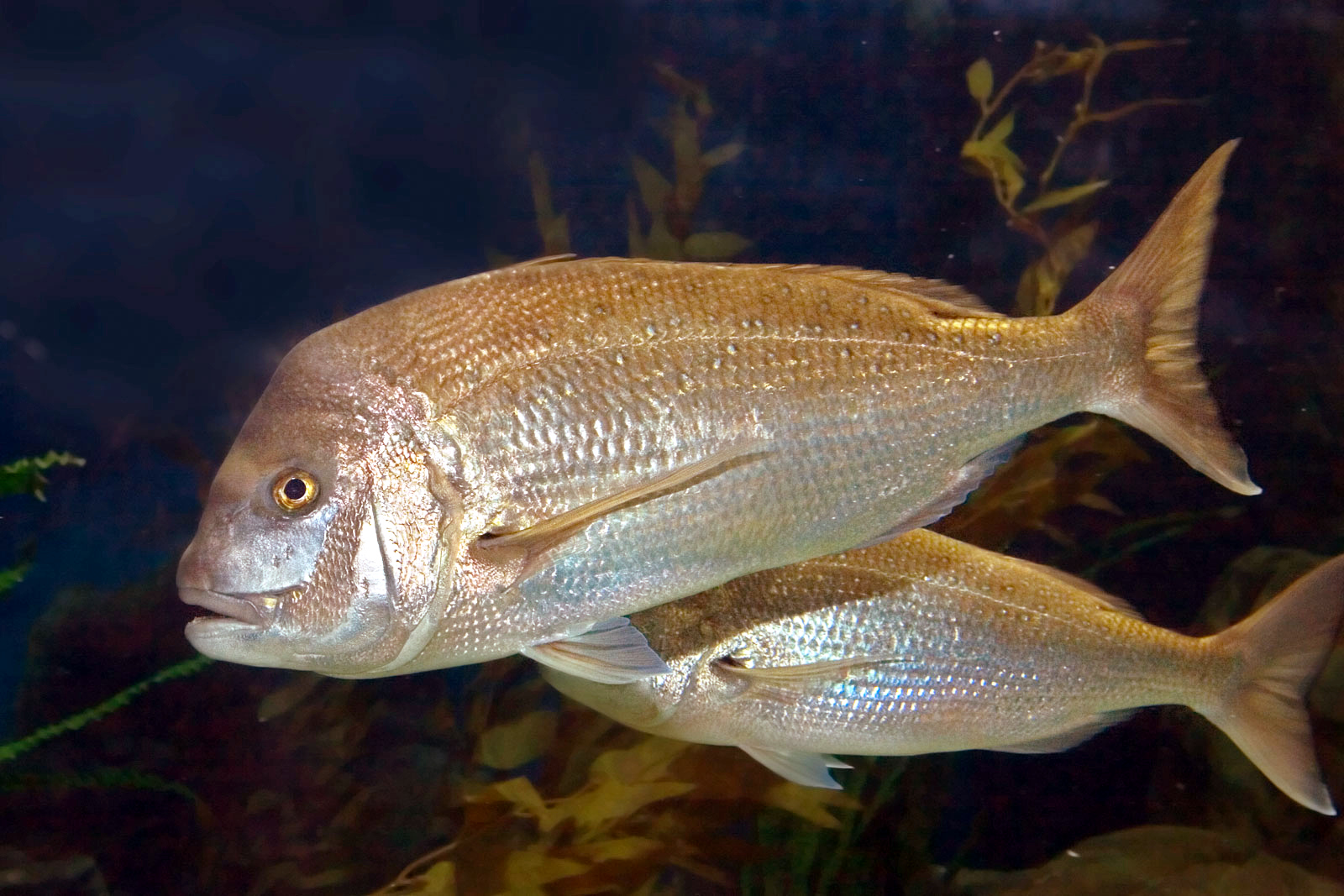
Chrysophrys auratus

The family Sparidae contains about 155 species in 38 genera:

- Acanthopagrus Peters, 1855
- Amamiichthys F. Tanaka & Iwatsuki, 2015
- Archosargus Gill, 1865
- Argyrops Swainson, 1839
- Argyrozona J. L. B. Smith, 1938
- Boops Cuvier, 1814
- Boopsoidea Castelnau, 1861
- Calamus Swainson, 1839
- Centracanthus Rafinesque, 1810
- Cheimerius J. L. B. Smith, 1938
- Chrysoblephus Swainson, 1839
- Chrysophrys Quoy & Gaimard, 1824
- Crenidens Valenciennes, 1830
- Cymatoceps J. L. B. Smith, 1938
- Dentex Cuvier, 1814
- Diplodus Rafinesque, 1810
- Evynnis D. S. Jordan & W. F. Thompson, 1912
- Gymnocrotaphus Günther, 1859
- Lagodon Holbrook, 1855
- Lithognathus Swainson, 1839
- Oblada Cuvier, 1829
- Pachymetopon Günther, 1859
- Pagellus Valenciennes, 1830
- Pagrus Cuvier, 1816
- Parargyrops S. Tanaka, 1916
- Petrus J. L. B. Smith, 1938
- Polyamblyodon Norman, 1935
- Polysteganus Klunzinger, 1870
- Porcostoma J. L. B. Smith, 1938
- Pterogymnus J. L. B. Smith, 1938
- Rhabdosargus Fowler, 1933
- Sarpa Bonaparte, 1831
- Sparidentex Munro, 1948
- Sparodon J. L. B. Smith, 1938
- Sparus Linnaeus, 1758
- Spicara Rafinesque, 1810
- Spondyliosoma Cantor, 1849
- Stenotomus Gill, 1865
- Virididentex Poll, 1971

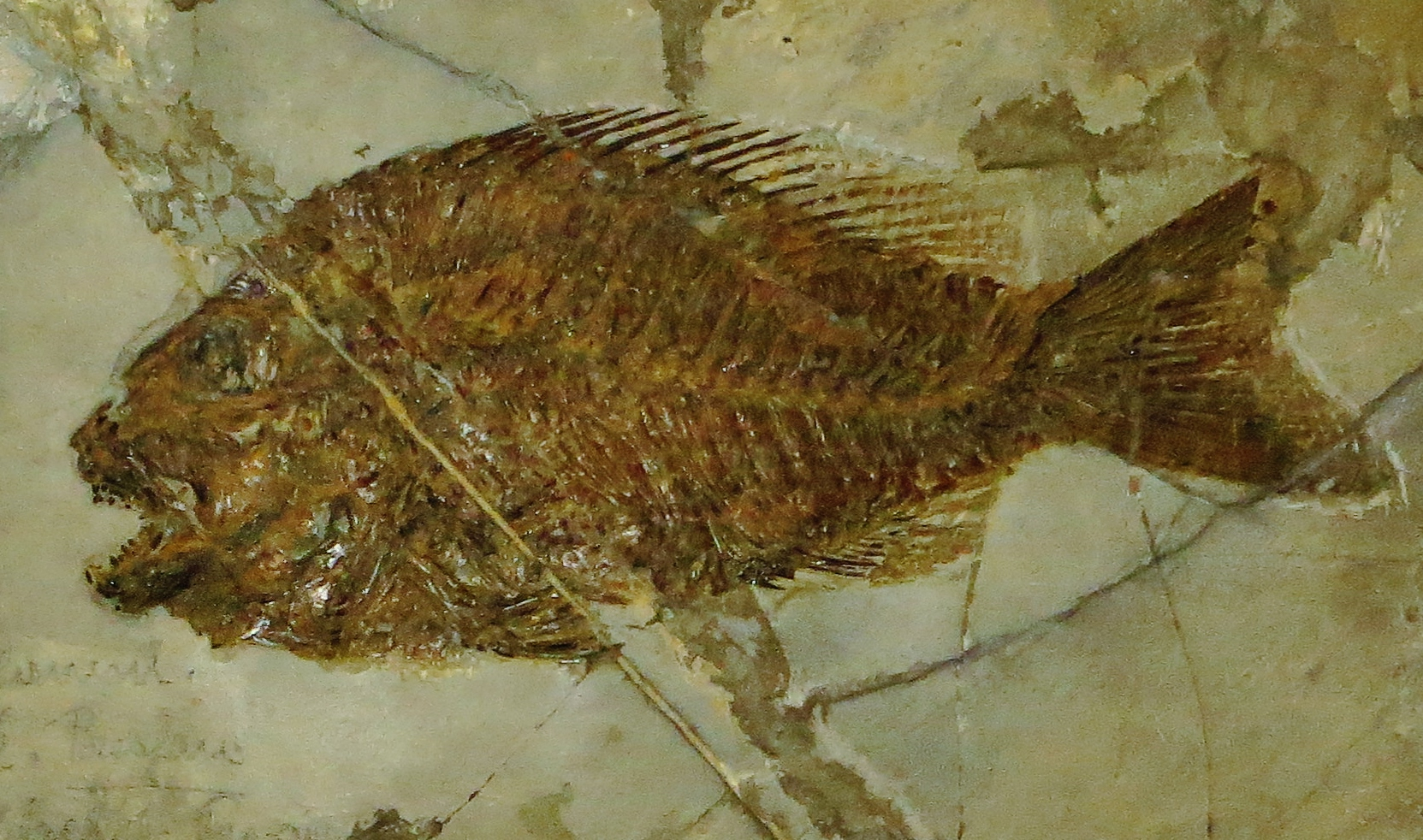
Sparnodus, a fossil seabream from the early Eocene of Italy

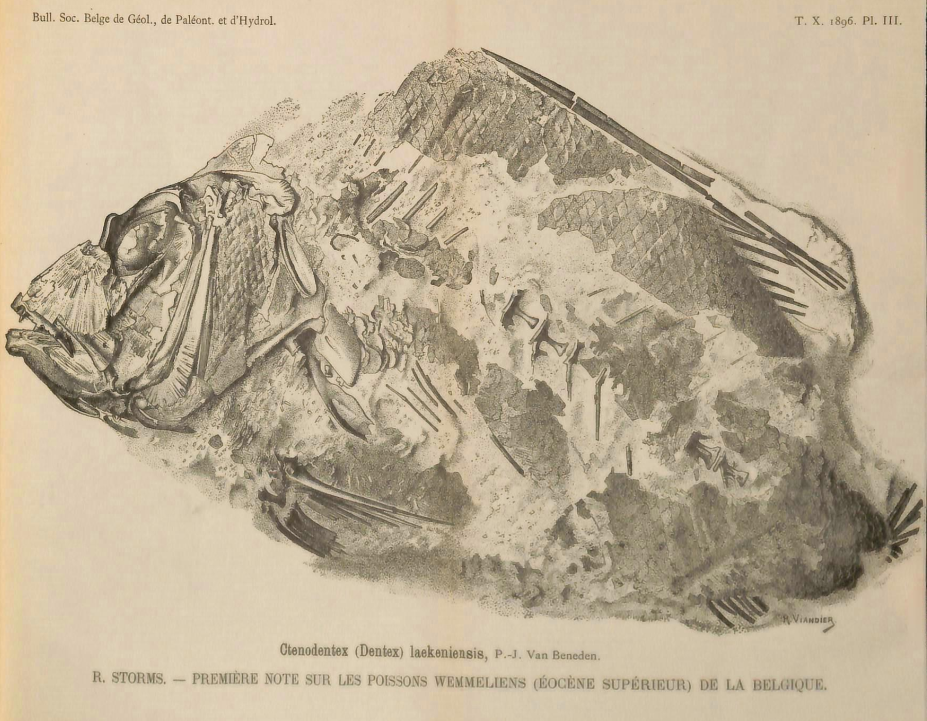
Ctenodentex, a fossil seabream from the middle Eocene of Belgium

Fossil genera include:

- †Abromasta Day, 2003 (Early Eocene of Italy)
- †Burtinia van Beneden, 1873 (Middle Eocene of Belgium)
- †Crommyodus Cope, 1875 (Early Miocene of New Jersey, US)
- †Ctenodentex Storms, 1896 (Middle Eocene of Belgium)
- †Ellaserrata Day, 2003 (Early Eocene of Italy)
- †Kreyenhagenius David, 1946 (Late Eocene/Early Oligocene of California, US) [scale]
- †Naslavcea Bannikov, 2006 (Middle Miocene of Moldova)
- †Paracalamus Arambourg, 1927 (Late Miocene of Algeria)
- †Plectrites Jordan & Gilbert, 1920 (Late Miocene of California, US)
- †Podocephalus Casier, 1966 (Early Eocene of England)
- †Pseudosparnodus Day, 2003 (Early Eocene of Italy)
- †Pshekharus Bannikov & Kotylar, 2015 (Middle Miocene of North Caucasus, Russia)
- †Rhythmias Jordan & Gilbert, 1920 (Late Miocene of California, US)
- †Sciaenurus Agassiz, 1845 (Early Eocene of England and Virginia, US)
- †Sparnodus Agassiz, 1838 (Early Eocene of Italy)

== Characteristics ==
Sparidae breams have oblong, moderately deep and compressed bodies. The head is large, with a characteristic steep dorsal slant. There are no scales on the snout but there are scales on the cheeks. The preoperculum may or may not have scales and has no spines or serrations on its margin. The operculum is scaled and also has no spines. The mouth is slightly oblique and can be protruded a little. The upper jaw never extends back past a vertical line through the centre of the eye. There are teeth in the jaws which vary from conical or flattened but there are no teeth on the roof of the mouth. There is one dorsal fin which is supported by between 10 and 13 spines and 9 and 17 soft rays, with the ultimate ray being split into 2, and no incision separated the spines from the soft rays. The rearmost spines in the dorsal fin may be elongated or filamentous. The anal fin is supported by 3 robust spines and between 7 and 15 soft rays. The caudal fin varies from moderately deeply emarginate to forked. The pectoral fins are typically long and pointed and the pelvic fins are under or immediately to the rear of the bases of the pectoral fins, supported a single spine and 5 soft rays, with a scale in the axilla, referred to as the axillary pelvic process. The scales are typically smooth, cycloid, or slightly rough to the touch, and weakly ctenoid. The lateral line is single and continuous and reaches the base of the caudal fin. They are very variable in colour and may be pinkish or reddish to yellowish or greyish, frequently with tints of silver or gold and dark or coloured spots, stripes or bars. The two largest species of Sparid are the white steenbras (Lithognathus lithognathus) and the red steenbras (Petrus rupestris), both of which have a maximum published total length of 200 cm (79 in), while the smallest species is the cherry seabream (Polysteganus cerasinus).

== Distribution and habitat ==
Sparidae breams are found in tropical and temperate coastal waters around the world. They are demersal fishes on the continental shelf and slope. A few species are found in brackish water, and a few of these will enter fresh water.

== Biology ==
Sparidae breams are predatory with most feeding on benthic invertebrates. Smaller species in the family usually gather in schools, as do the juveniles of the larger species. The larger adult fishes are normally solitary or, at least, are less sociable and prefer deeper waters. The juveniles and subadults are often markedly different in shape and colour patterns, and may be much more colourful. Many sparids are hermaphroditic and some have both male and female sex organs at the same time. Others change sex as they grow, either from male to female or from female to male.

== Fisheries ==
Sparids are highly regarded as food fish and are important target species for commercial fisheries wherever they occur. Between 1990 and 1995, the FAO Yearbook of Fishery Statistics reported that the annual weight of landings was between 2,170 and 4,020 t (2,140 and 3,960 long tons; 2,390 and 4,430 short tons) of sparids in the Western Central Pacific.

== Culinary use ==
The most celebrated of the breams for culinary use are the gilt-head bream and the common dentex.

== See also ==
- Porgie fishing
