= Adaptive radiation =

Process in which organisms diversify rapidly from an ancestral species

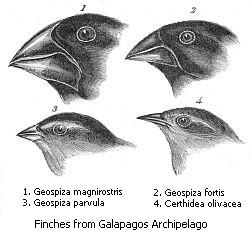
Four of the 14 finch species found in the Galápagos Archipelago, which are thought to have evolved via an adaptive radiation that diversified their beak shapes, enabling them to exploit different food sources.

In evolutionary biology, adaptive radiation is a process in which organisms diversify rapidly from an ancestral species into a multitude of new forms, particularly when a change in the environment makes new resources available, alters biotic interactions or opens new environmental niches. Starting with a single ancestor, this process results in the speciation and phenotypic adaptation of an array of species exhibiting different morphological and physiological traits. The prototypical example of adaptive radiation is finch speciation on the Galapagos ("Darwin's finches"), but examples are known from around the world.

== Characteristics ==
Four features can be used to identify an adaptive radiation:

1. A common ancestry of component species: specifically a recent ancestry. Note that this is not the same as a monophyly in which all descendants of a common ancestor are included.
2. A phenotype-environment correlation: a significant association between environments and the morphological and physiological traits used to exploit those environments.
3. Trait utility: the performance or fitness advantages of trait values in their corresponding environments.
4. Rapid speciation: presence of one or more bursts in the emergence of new species around the time that ecological and phenotypic divergence is underway.

== Conditions ==
Adaptive radiations are thought to be triggered by an ecological opportunity or a new adaptive zone. Sources of ecological opportunity can be the loss of antagonists (competitors or predators), the evolution of a key innovation, or dispersal to a new environment. Any one of these ecological opportunities has the potential to result in an increase in population size and relaxed stabilizing (constraining) selection. As genetic diversity is positively correlated with population size the expanded population will have more genetic diversity compared to the ancestral population. With reduced stabilizing selection phenotypic diversity can also increase. In addition, intraspecific competition will increase, promoting divergent selection to use a wider range of resources. This ecological release provides the potential for ecological speciation and thus adaptive radiation.

Occupying a new environment might take place under the following conditions:

1. A new habitat has opened up: a volcano, for example, can create new ground in the middle of the ocean. This is the case in places like Hawaii and the Galapagos. For aquatic species, the formation of a large new lake habitat could serve the same purpose; the tectonic movement that formed the East African Rift, ultimately leading to the creation of the Rift Valley Lakes, is an example of this. An extinction event could effectively achieve this same result, opening up niches that were previously occupied by species that no longer exist.
2. This new habitat is relatively isolated. When a volcano erupts on the mainland and destroys an adjacent forest, it is likely that the terrestrial plant and animal species that used to live in the destroyed region will recolonize without evolving greatly. However, if a newly formed habitat is isolated, the species that colonize it will likely be somewhat random and uncommon arrivals.
3. The new habitat has a wide availability of niche space. The rare colonist can only adaptively radiate into as many forms as there are niches.

=== Relationship between mass-extinctions and mass adaptive radiations ===
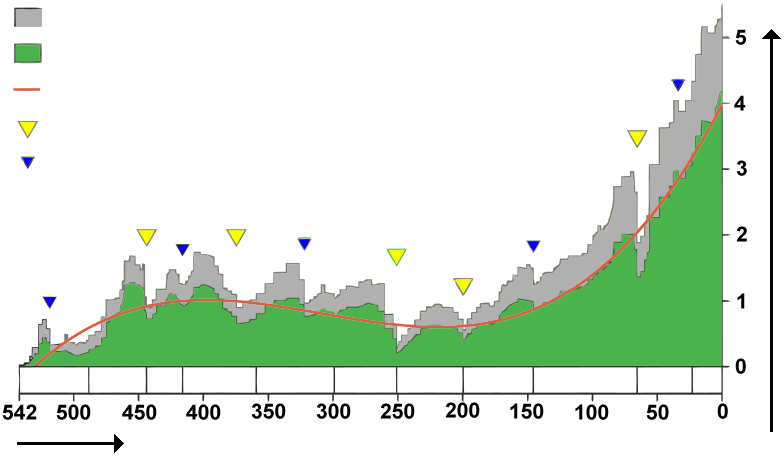
Phanerozoic biodiversity as shown by the fossil record

A 2020 study found there to be no direct causal relationship between the proportionally most comparable mass radiations and extinctions in terms of "co-occurrence of species", substantially challenging the hypothesis of "creative mass extinctions".

== Examples ==
=== Darwin's finches ===
Darwin's finches on the Galapagos Islands are a model system for the study of adaptive radiation. Today represented by approximately 15 species, Darwin's finches are Galapagos endemics famously adapted for a specialized feeding behavior (although one species, the Cocos finch (Pinaroloxias inornata), is not found in the Galapagos but on the island of Cocos south of Costa Rica). Darwin's finches are not actually finches in the true sense, but are members of the tanager family Thraupidae, and are derived from a single ancestor that arrived in the Galapagos from mainland South America perhaps just 3 million years ago. Excluding the Cocos finch, each species of Darwin's finch is generally widely distributed in the Galapagos and fills the same niche on each island. For the ground finches, this niche is a diet of seeds, and they have thick bills to facilitate the consumption of these hard materials. The ground finches are further specialized to eat seeds of a particular size: the large ground finch (Geospiza magnirostris) is the largest species of Darwin's finch and has the thickest beak for breaking open the toughest seeds, the small ground finch (Geospiza fuliginosa) has a smaller beak for eating smaller seeds, and the medium ground finch (Geospiza fortis) has a beak of intermediate size for optimal consumption of intermediately sized seeds (relative to G. magnirostris and G. fuliginosa). There is some overlap: for example, the most robust medium ground finches could have beaks larger than those of the smallest large ground finches. Because of this overlap, it can be difficult to tell the species apart by eye, though their songs differ. These three species often occur sympatrically, and during the rainy season in the Galapagos when food is plentiful, they specialize little and eat the same, easily accessible foods. It was not well-understood why their beaks were so adapted until Peter and Rosemary Grant studied their feeding behavior in the long dry season, and discovered that when food is scarce, the ground finches use their specialized beaks to eat the seeds that they are best suited to eat and thus avoid starvation.

The other finches in the Galapagos are similarly uniquely adapted for their particular niche. The cactus finches (Geospiza sp.) have somewhat longer beaks than the ground finches that serve the dual purpose of allowing them to feed on Opuntia cactus nectar and pollen while these plants are flowering, but on seeds during the rest of the year. The warbler-finches (Certhidea sp.) have short, pointed beaks for eating insects. The woodpecker finch (Camarhynchus pallidus) has a slender beak which it uses to pick at wood in search of insects; it also uses small sticks to reach insect prey inside the wood, making it one of the few animals that use tools.

The mechanism by which the finches initially diversified is still an area of active research. One proposition is that the finches were able to have a non-adaptive, allopatric speciation event on separate islands in the archipelago, such that when they reconverged on some islands, they were able to maintain reproductive isolation. Once they occurred in sympatry, niche specialization was favored so that the different species competed less directly for resources. This second, sympatric event was adaptive radiation.

=== Cichlids of the African Great Lakes ===
The haplochromine cichlid fishes in the Great Lakes of the East African Rift (particularly in Lake Tanganyika, Lake Malawi, and Lake Victoria) form the most speciose modern example of adaptive radiation. These lakes are believed to be home to about 2,000 different species of cichlid, spanning a wide range of ecological roles and morphological characteristics. Cichlids in these lakes fill nearly all of the roles typically filled by many fish families, including those of predators, scavengers, and herbivores, with varying dentitions and head shapes to match their dietary habits. In each case, the radiation events are only a few million years old, making the high level of speciation particularly remarkable. Several factors could be responsible for this diversity: the availability of a multitude of niches probably favored specialization, as few other fish taxa are present in the lakes (meaning that sympatric speciation was the most probable mechanism for initial specialization). Also, continual changes in the water level of the lakes during the Pleistocene (which often turned the largest lakes into several smaller ones) could have created the conditions for secondary allopatric speciation.

==== Tanganyika cichlids ====
Lake Tanganyika is the site from which nearly all the cichlid lineages of East Africa (including both riverine and lake species) originated. Thus, the species in the lake constitute a single adaptive radiation event but do not form a single monophyletic clade. Lake Tanganyika is also the least speciose of the three largest African Great Lakes, with only around 200 species of cichlid; however, these cichlids are more morphologically divergent and ecologically distinct than their counterparts in lakes Malawi and Victoria, an artifact of Lake Tanganyika's older cichlid fauna. Lake Tanganyika itself is believed to have formed 9–12 million years ago, putting a recent cap on the age of the lake's cichlid fauna. Many of Tanganyika's cichlids live very specialized lifestyles. The giant or emperor cichlid (Boulengerochromis microlepis) is a piscivore often ranked the largest of all cichlids (though it competes for this title with South America's Cichla temensis, the speckled peacock bass). It is thought that giant cichlids spawn only a single time, breeding in their third year and defending their young until they reach a large size, before dying of starvation some time thereafter. The three species of Altolamprologus are also piscivores, but with laterally compressed bodies and thick scales enabling them to chase prey into thin cracks in rocks without damaging their skin. Plecodus straeleni has evolved large, strangely curved teeth that are designed to scrape scales off of the sides of other fish, scales being its main source of food. Gnathochromis permaxillaris possesses a large mouth with a protruding upper lip, and feeds by opening this mouth downward onto the sandy lake bottom, sucking in small invertebrates. A number of Tanganyika's cichlids are shell-brooders, meaning that mating pairs lay and fertilize their eggs inside of empty shells on the lake bottom. Lamprologus callipterus is a unique egg-brooding species, with 15 cm-long males amassing collections of shells and guarding them in the hopes of attracting females (about 6 cm in length) to lay eggs in these shells. These dominant males must defend their territories from three types of rival: (1) other dominant males looking to steal shells; (2) younger, "sneaker" males looking to fertilize eggs in a dominant male's territory; and (3) tiny, 2–4 cm "parasitic dwarf" males that also attempt to rush in and fertilize eggs in the dominant male's territory. These parasitic dwarf males never grow to the size of dominant males, and the male offspring of dominant and parasitic dwarf males grow with 100% fidelity into the form of their fathers. A number of other highly specialized Tanganyika cichlids exist aside from these examples, including those adapted for life in open lake water up to 200m deep.

==== Malawi cichlids ====
The cichlids of Lake Malawi constitute a "species flock" of up to 1000 endemic species. Only seven cichlid species in Lake Malawi are not a part of the species flock: the Eastern happy (Astatotilapia calliptera), the sungwa (Serranochromis robustus), and five tilapia species (genera Oreochromis and Coptodon). All of the other cichlid species in the lake are descendants of a single original colonist species, which itself was descended from Tanganyikan ancestors. The common ancestor of Malawi's species flock is believed to have reached the lake 3.4 million years ago at the earliest, making Malawi cichlids' diversification into their present numbers particularly rapid. Malawi's cichlids span a similarly range of feeding behaviors to those of Tanganyika, but also show signs of a much more recent origin. For example, all members of the Malawi species flock are mouth-brooders, meaning the female keeps her eggs in her mouth until they hatch; in almost all species, the eggs are also fertilized in the female's mouth, and in a few species, the females continue to guard their fry in their mouth after they hatch. Males of most species display predominantly blue coloration when mating. However, a number of particularly divergent species are known from Malawi, including the piscivorous Nimbochromis livingtonii, which lies on its side in the substrate until small cichlids, perhaps drawn to its broken white patterning, come to inspect the predator - at which point they are swiftly eaten.

==== Victoria's cichlids ====
Lake Victoria's cichlids are also a species flock, once composed of some 500 or more species. The deliberate introduction of the Nile Perch (Lates niloticus) in the 1950s proved disastrous for Victoria cichlids, and the collective biomass of the Victoria cichlid species flock has decreased substantially and an unknown number of species have become extinct. However, the original range of morphological and behavioral diversity seen in the lake's cichlid fauna is still mostly present today, if endangered. These again include cichlids specialized for niches across the trophic spectrum, as in Tanganyika and Malawi, but again, there are standouts. Victoria is famously home to many piscivorous cichlid species, some of which feed by sucking the contents out of mouthbrooding females' mouths. Victoria's cichlids constitute a far younger radiation than even that of Lake Malawi, with estimates of the age of the flock ranging from 200,000 years to as little as 14,000.

=== Adaptive radiation in Hawaii ===
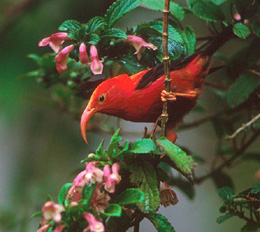
An ʻiʻiwi (Drepanis coccinea). Note the long, curved beak for sipping nectar from tubular flowers.

Hawaii has served as the site of a number of adaptive radiation events, owing to its isolation, recent origin, and large land area. The three most famous examples of these radiations are presented below, though insects like the Hawaiian drosophilid flies and Hyposmocoma moths have also undergone adaptive radiation.

==== Hawaiian honeycreepers ====
The Hawaiian honeycreepers form a large, highly morphologically diverse species group of birds that began radiating in the early days of the Hawaiian archipelago. While today only 17 species are known to persist in Hawaii (3 more may or may not be extinct), there were more than 50 species prior to Polynesian colonization of the archipelago (between 18 and 21 species have gone extinct since the discovery of the islands by westerners). The Hawaiian honeycreepers are known for their beaks, which are specialized to satisfy a wide range of dietary needs: for example, the beak of the ʻakiapōlāʻau (Hemignathus wilsoni) is characterized by a short, sharp lower mandible for scraping bark off of trees, and the much longer, curved upper mandible is used to probe the wood underneath for insects. Meanwhile, the ʻiʻiwi (Drepanis coccinea) has a very long curved beak for reaching nectar deep in Lobelia flowers. An entire clade of Hawaiian honeycreepers, the tribe Psittirostrini, is composed of thick-billed, mostly seed-eating birds, like the Laysan finch (Telespiza cantans). In at least some cases, similar morphologies and behaviors appear to have evolved convergently among the Hawaiian honeycreepers; for example, the short, pointed beaks of Loxops and Oreomystis evolved separately despite once forming the justification for lumping the two genera together. The Hawaiian honeycreepers are believed to have descended from a single common ancestor some 15 to 20 million years ago, though estimates range as low as 3.5 million years.

==== Hawaiian silverswords ====
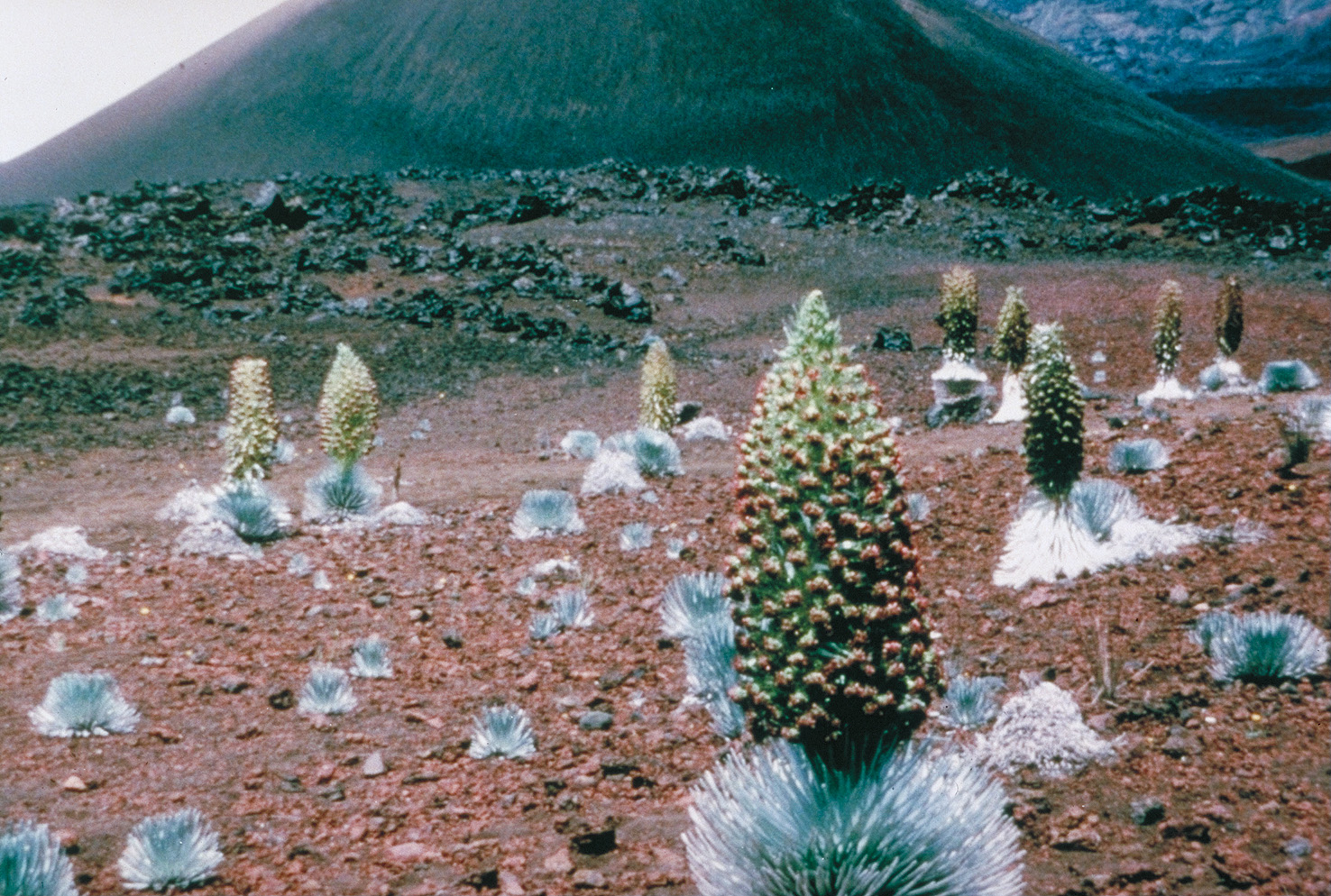
A mixture of blooming and non-blooming Haleakalā silverswords (Argyroxiphium sandwicense macrocephalum).

Adaptive radiation is not a strictly vertebrate phenomenon, and examples are also known from among plants. The most famous example of adaptive radiation in plants is quite possibly the Hawaiian silverswords, named for alpine desert-dwelling Argyroxiphium species with long, silvery leaves that live for up to 20 years before growing a single flowering stalk and then dying. The Hawaiian silversword alliance consists of twenty-eight species of Hawaiian plants which, aside from the eponymous silverswords, includes trees, shrubs, vines, cushion plants, and more. The silversword alliance is believed to have originated in Hawaii no more than 6 million years ago, making this one of Hawaii's youngest adaptive radiation events. This means that the silverswords evolved on Hawaii's modern high islands, and descended from a single common ancestor that arrived on Kauaʻi from western North America. The closest modern relatives of the silverswords today are California tarweeds of the family Asteraceae.

==== Hawaiian lobelioids ====
Hawaii is also the site of a separate major floral adaptive radiation event: the Hawaiian lobelioids. The Hawaiian lobelioids are significantly more speciose than the silverswords, perhaps because they have been present in Hawaii for so much longer: they descended from a single common ancestor who arrived in the archipelago up to 15 million years ago. Today the Hawaiian lobelioids form a clade of over 125 species, including succulents, trees, shrubs, epiphytes, etc. Many species have been lost to extinction and many of the surviving species endangered.

=== Caribbean anoles ===
Anole lizards are distributed broadly in the New World, from the Southeastern US to South America. With over 400 species currently recognized, often placed in a single genus (Anolis), they constitute one of the largest radiation events among all lizards. Anole radiation on the mainland has largely been a process of speciation, and is not adaptive to any great degree, but anoles on each of the Greater Antilles (Cuba, Hispaniola, Puerto Rico, and Jamaica) have adaptively radiated in separate, convergent ways. On each of these islands, anoles have evolved with such a consistent set of morphological adaptations that each species can be assigned to one of six "ecomorphs": trunk–ground, trunk–crown, grass–bush, crown–giant, twig, and trunk. Take for example crown–giants from each of these islands: the Cuban Anolis luteogularis, Hispaniola's Anolis ricordii, Puerto Rico's Anolis cuvieri, and Jamaica's Anolis garmani (Cuba and Hispaniola are both home to more than one species of crown–giant). These anoles are all large, canopy-dwelling species with large heads and large lamellae (scales on the undersides of the fingers and toes that are important for traction in climbing), and yet none of these species are particularly closely related and appear to have evolved these similar traits independently. The same can be said of the other five ecomorphs across the Caribbean's four largest islands. Much like in the case of the cichlids of the three largest African Great Lakes, each of these islands is home to its own convergent Anolis adaptive radiation event.

=== Other examples ===
Presented above are the most well-documented examples of modern adaptive radiation, but other examples are known. Populations of three-spined sticklebacks have repeatedly diverged and evolved into distinct ecotypes. On Madagascar, birds of the family Vangidae are marked by very distinct beak shapes to suit their ecological roles. Madagascan mantellid frogs have radiated into forms that mirror other tropical frog faunas, with the brightly colored mantellas (Mantella) having evolved convergently with the Neotropical poison dart frogs of Dendrobatidae, while the arboreal Boophis species are the Madagascan equivalent of tree frogs and glass frogs. The pseudoxyrhophiine snakes of Madagascar have evolved into fossorial, arboreal, terrestrial, and semi-aquatic forms that converge with the colubroid faunas in the rest of the world. These Madagascan examples are significantly older than most of the other examples presented here: Madagascar's fauna has been evolving in isolation since the island split from India some 88 million years ago, and the Mantellidae originated around 50 mya. Older examples are known: the K-Pg extinction event, which caused the disappearance of the dinosaurs and most other reptilian megafauna 65.5 million years ago, is seen as having triggered a global adaptive radiation event that created the mammal diversity that exists today. Also the Cambrian Explosion, where vacant niches left by the extinction of Ediacaran biota during End-Ediacaran mass extinction were filled up by the emergence of new phyla. At an even broader scale, it is possible to consider the evolution and expansion of entire groups of organisms as adaptive radiations, such as the radiation of the angiosperms, more generally of the land plants, of the Viridiplantae, or even of the entire tree of life on Earth. Thus for an evolutionary lineage to be defined as an adaptive radiation it is necessary to delimit the geographic range and period of the radiation.

== See also ==
- Cambrian explosion—the most notable evolutionary radiation event
- Evolutionary radiation—a more general term to describe any radiation
- List of adaptive radiated Hawaiian honeycreepers by form
- List of adaptive radiated marsupials by form
- Nonadaptive radiation
