= Bream =

Several species of freshwater and marine fish

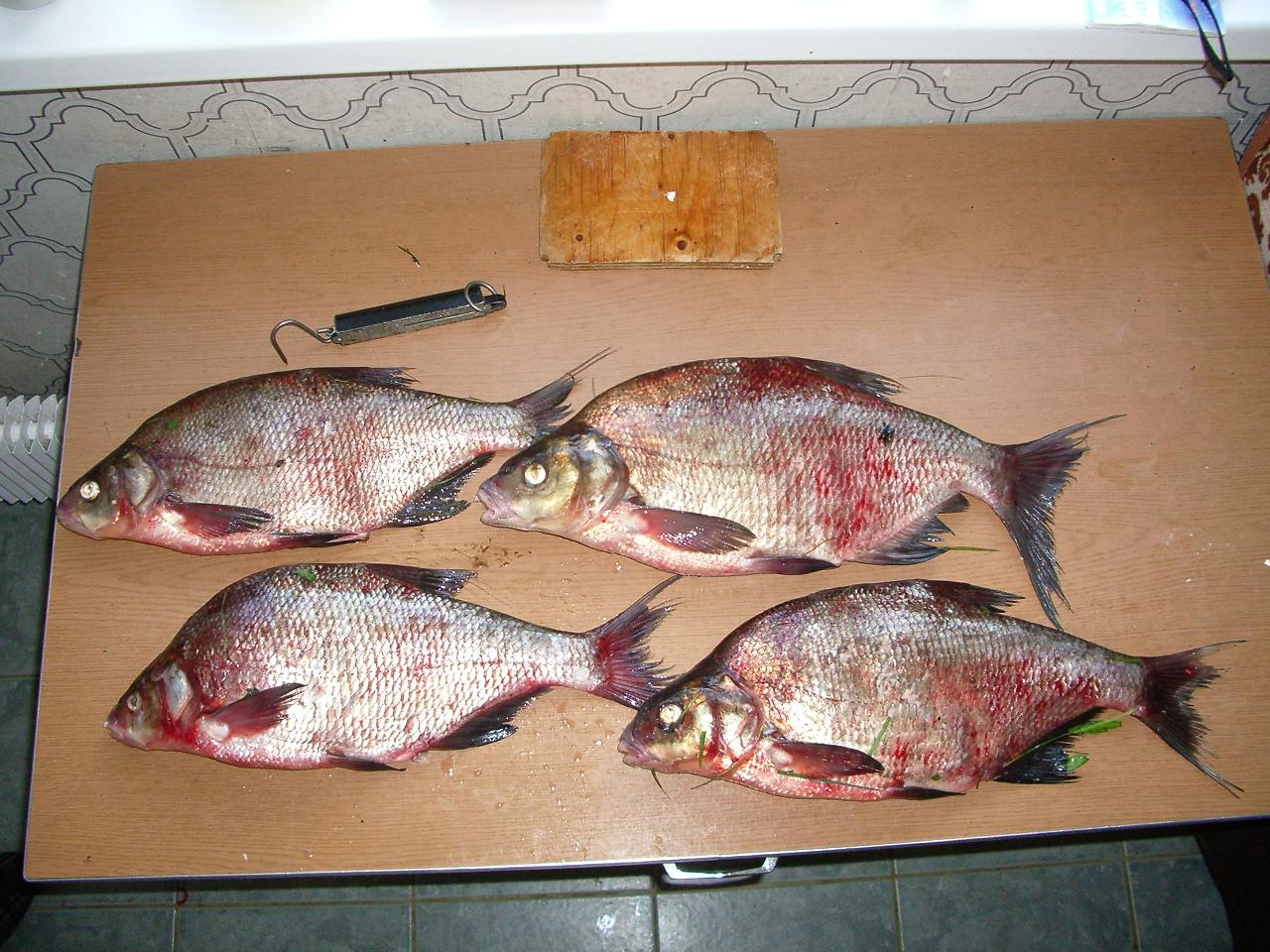
Common bream caught in the Volga River near Kashin, Russia

Bream (/ˈbriːm/, US also /ˈbrɪm/) are species of freshwater fish belonging to a variety of genera including Abramis (e.g., A. brama, the common bream), Ballerus, Blicca, Chilotilapia, Etelis, Lepomis, Gymnocranius, Lethrinus, Nemipterus, Pharyngochromis, Rhabdosargus, Scolopsis, or Serranochromis.

Although species from all of these genera are called "bream", the term does not imply a degree of relatedness between them. Fish termed "bream" tend to be narrow, deep-bodied species. The name is a derivation of the Middle English word breme, of Old French origin.

== Marine species ==
The term sea bream is sometimes used for fish of the family Sparidae including Acanthopagrus (Australia), Argyrops, gilt-head bream Sparus aurata (orata in Italy, dorada in Spain), black seabream Spondyliosoma cantharus and red seabream Pagrus or Pagellus species; or pomfrets (family Bramidae).

== See also ==
- Porgy fishing
- Bluegill, sometimes called 'bream'
