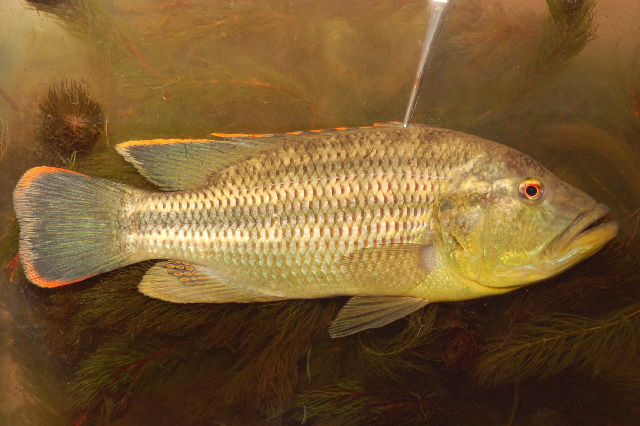

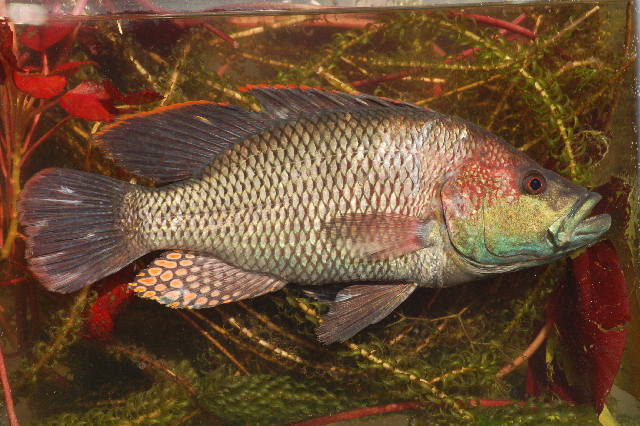
- S. jallae (above); S. macrocephalus (below)

Scientific classification
- Kingdom: Animalia
- Phylum: Chordata
- Class: Actinopterygii
- Division: Teleostei
- Order: Cichliformes
- Family: Cichlidae
- Tribe: Haplochromini
- Genus: Serranochromis; Regan, 1920

Type species
- Chromys thumbergi Castelnau, 1861

= Serranochromis =

Genus of fishes

Serranochromis is a genus of relatively large, robust cichlids from freshwater habitats in mainland Southern Africa, ranging as far north as DR Congo and Tanzania, with the highest species richness in the upper Zambezi, Okavango and Congo basins. They are typically known as largemouths or, especially among fishers, breams (although unrelated to other fish known as "bream"). Serranochromis are mostly piscivores and they are important in local fisheries.

== Habitat ==
Serranochromis live in a wide variety of freshwater habitats, ranging from shallow, heavily vegetated waters to deep, open waters. This includes main river channels, backwaters, floodplains, lakes and lagoons, but only a few of the species have been recorded in fast-flowing waters. Smaller Serranochromis tend to avoid open waters if common tigerfish are present, but the largest Serranochromis are generally too large to be considered typical prey to common tigerfish and they co-exist in the same habitat.

== Appearance and behavior ==
Depending on the exact species of Serranochromis, the maximum length is between 25 and 56 cm (10–22 in), and the largest species can reach up to 7 kg (15 lb) in weight.

They feed almost entirely on small fish, especially other cichlids, cyprinids, elephantfish and squeaker catfish, but some will also take invertebrates. Although all will take most types of small fish, there is a level of specialisation: S. altus is nocturnal or crepuscular, similar to its main prey, the elephantfish. S. angusticeps is well-camouflaged among dense aquatic vegetation, which allows it to slowly approach its main prey, small cyprinids. S. jallae has a particularly robust mouth and teeth suitable for dealing with its main prey, the spiny and heavily armored squeaker catfish (however, young S. jallae mostly feed on small cyprinids and aquatic insects).

Serranochromis are mouthbrooders and most—if not all—species are seasonal breeders that begin spawning around the end of the low water period. They generally reach maturity when two or three years old.

== Fishing and conservation status ==
Serranochromis support important commercial and subsistence fisheries, and are also valued as game fish. S. jallae has been introduced for fishing to some places in Southern Africa outside its original range and in these places it can have an adverse effect on small native fish, especially cyprinids. Conversely, S. robustus has declined drastically in its native range due to overfishing, leading the IUCN to rate it as critically endangered. S. meridianus is considered endangered due to habitat degradation and the poorly known S. janus is considered data deficient (available information is insufficient for determining its conservation status), while the remaining species in the genus are least concern (not threatened).

== Species and taxonomy ==
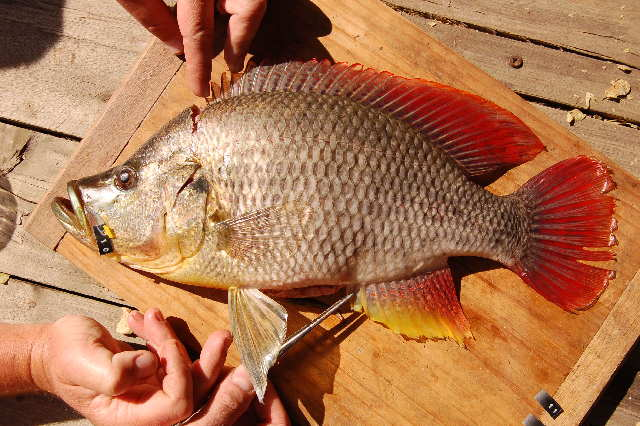
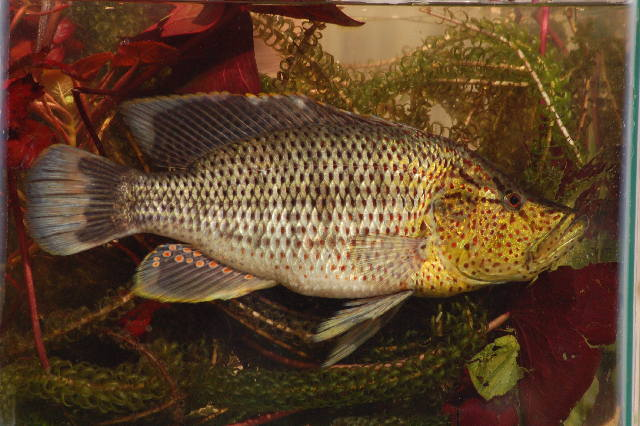
S. altus (right) and S. angusticeps (left) were confused until 1991 and their morphology is quite similar, but they do differ in certain morphometrics, color, habitat preference and feeding behavior

According to FishBase, there are currently 11 recognized species in this genus:

- Serranochromis altus Winemiller & Kelso-Winemiller, 1991 (Humpback largemouth)
- Serranochromis angusticeps (Boulenger, 1907) (Speckleface bream, thinface cichlid)
- Serranochromis jallae (Boulenger, 1896) (Nembwe)
- Serranochromis janus Trewavas, 1964
- Serranochromis longimanus (Boulenger, 1911) (Longfin largemouth)
- Serranochromis macrocephalus (Boulenger, 1899) (Purpleface largemouth)
- Serranochromis meridianus R. A. Jubb, 1967 (Lowveld largemouth)
- Serranochromis robustus (Günther, 1864) (Yellow-belly bream)
- Serranochromis spei Trewavas, 1964
- Serranochromis stappersi Trewavas, 1964
- Serranochromis thumbergi (Castelnau, 1861) (Brownspot largemouth)

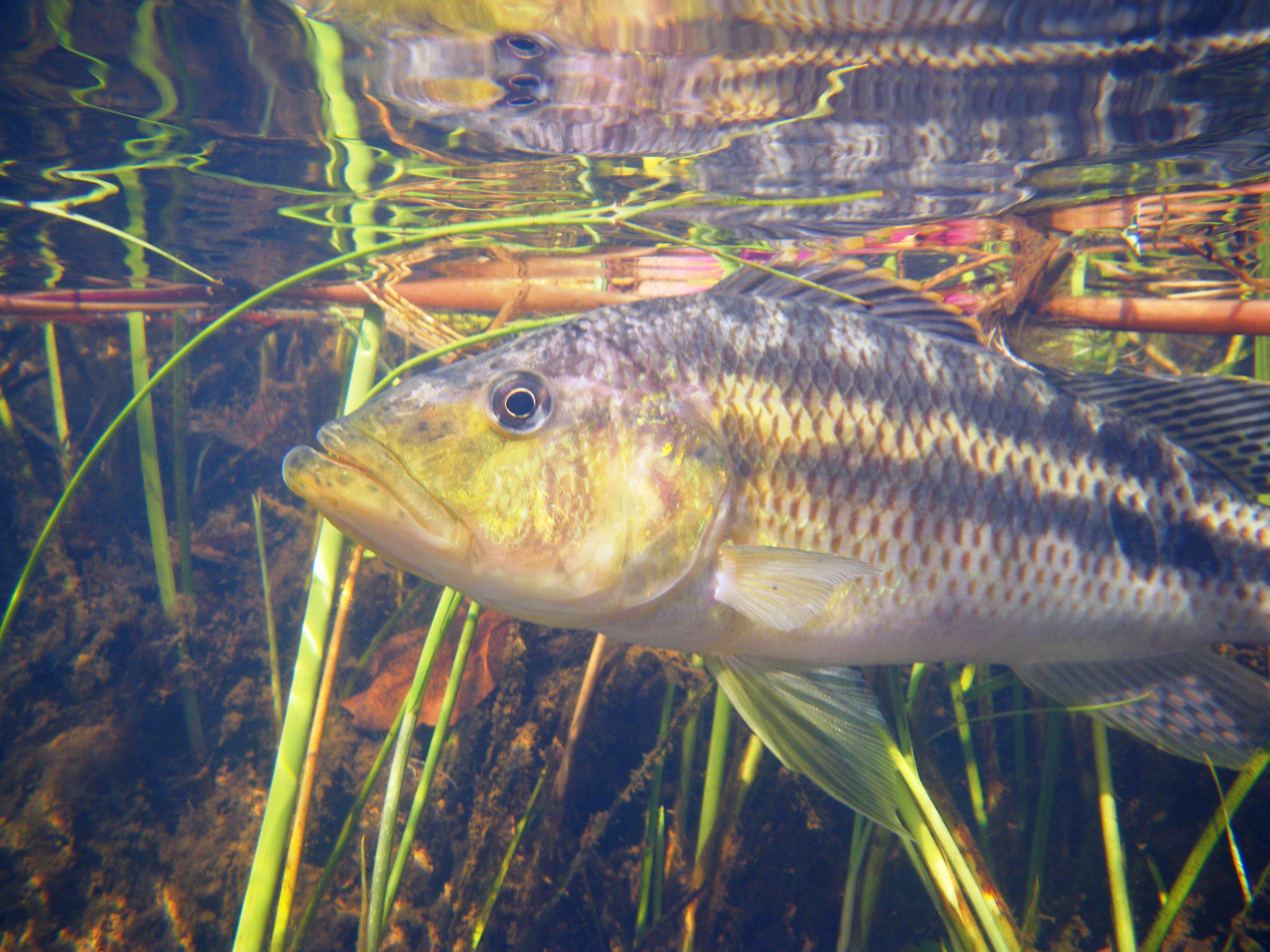
Serranochromis thumbergi collected in Lavushi Manda National Park, Zambia, by the South African Institute for Aquatic Biodiversity

A few other, possibly undescribed species are known from the genus. Furthermore, the taxonomy of the S. macrocephalus and S. robustus complexes is not fully resolved. Based on mtDNA, both are polyphyletic. A partial solution to the S. robustus complex has been to recognize jallae as its own species, instead of the traditional treatment where it was considered a subspecies of S. robustus.

Additionally, Sargochromis (the "smallmouths"; found in the same overall region and mostly feed on invertebrates) has been considered a subgenus of Serranochromis, but today it is generally recognized as a separate genus. These genera, along with Chetia, Pharyngochromis and others, form a group sometimes known as the serranochromines or Serranochromini. How many other genera that are included varies, with some defining the group relatively narrowly and others broadly. Genetic evidence indicates that several genera in this group, including Serranochromis, are not monophyletic.
