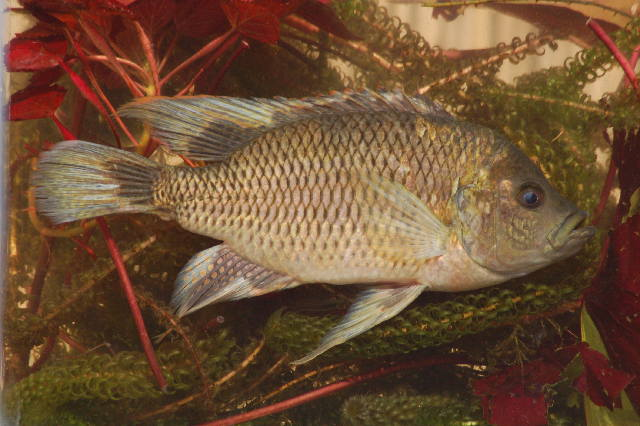

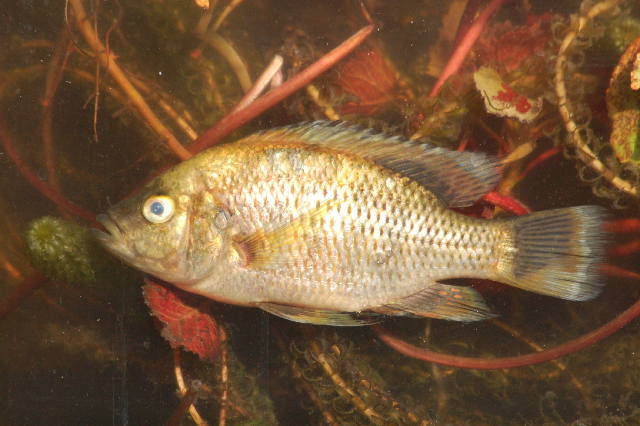
- S. carlottae (above), S. codringtonii (below)

Scientific classification
- Kingdom: Animalia
- Phylum: Chordata
- Class: Actinopterygii
- Division: Teleostei
- Order: Cichliformes
- Family: Cichlidae
- Tribe: Haplochromini
- Genus: Sargochromis; Regan, 1920

Type species
- Paratilapia codringtonii Boulenger, 1908

= Sargochromis =

Genus of fishes

Sargochromis is a genus of haplochromine cichlids native to freshwater habitats in Southern Africa, where found in the upper and middle Zambezi basin, Okavango delta, Cunene basin, Cuvelai basin and southeastern Congo Basin. They are typically known as happies (a name also used for some other haplocromines) or smallmouths. The latter name refers to their small mouth compared to their close relatives, the largemouths of the genus Serranochromis. Unlike the species in that genus which mostly feed on other fish, Sargochromis mostly feed on invertebrates (especially molluscs and aquatic insects), but in some species plant material (especially seeds) is important. On occasion they will also eat small fish, and the stomachs of S. carlottae and S. codringtonii commonly contain fish scales, but whether these are already-lost scales that are picked off the bottom or they are actively bumped off large fish is unknown. Some of the species that feed heavily on aquatic snails have been used for biological pest control. Sargochromis are mouthbrooders. Depending on the exact species, they reach a maximum total length of 20 to 48 cm (8–19 in).

Sargochromis support important local fisheries, and some are also considered game fish. Although a few species have quite small distributions, they generally remain fairly common overall. All Sargochromis species are considered least concern (not threatened) by the IUCN, except the relatively poorly known S. thysi, which is considered data deficient (available information is insufficient for determining its conservation status).

== Species and taxonomy ==
There are currently eight recognized species in this genus:

- Sargochromis carlottae (Boulenger, 1905) (Rainbow Happy)
- Sargochromis codringtonii (Boulenger, 1908) (Green Happy)
- Sargochromis coulteri (Bell-Cross, 1975) (Cunene Happy)
- Sargochromis giardi (Pellegrin, 1903) (Pink Happy)
- Sargochromis greenwoodi (Bell-Cross, 1975) (Greenwood's Happy)
- Sargochromis mellandi (Boulenger, 1905) (Snaileater)
- Sargochromis mortimeri (Bell-Cross, 1975) (Mortimer's Happy)
- Sargochromis thysi (Poll, 1967)

A few other, possibly undescribed species are known.

In the past, Sargochromis was considered a subgenus of Serranochromis, but today it is generally recognized as a separate genus. These genera, along with Chetia, Pharyngochromis and others, form a group sometimes known as the serranochromines or Serranochromini. How many other genera that are included varies, with some defining the group relatively narrowly and others broadly. Genetic evidence indicates that several genera in this group, including Sargochromis, are not monophyletic.
