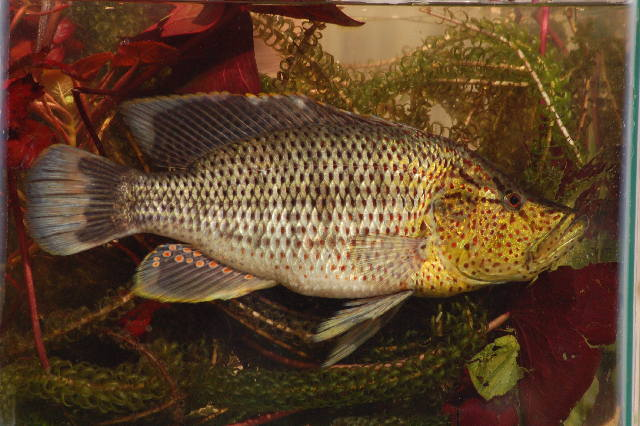
- Adult Serranochromis angusticeps

Scientific classification
- Kingdom: Animalia
- Phylum: Chordata
- Class: Actinopterygii
- Order: Cichliformes
- Family: Cichlidae
- Genus: Serranochromis
- Species: S. angusticeps

Binomial name
- Serranochromis angusticeps (Boulenger, 1907)

Synonyms
- Paratilapia angusticeps Boulenger, 1907

= Serranochromis angusticeps =

Species of fish

Serranochromis angusticeps, commonly known as the speckleface bream or thinface cichlid, is a species of predatory cichlid fish endemic to the freshwater systems of south-central Africa. It is a member of the piscivorous genus Serranochromis. and is distinguished from its relatives by its slender head and body profile.

== Taxonomy and naming ==
The species was first formally described in 1907 by the Belgian-British zoologist George Albert Boulenger as Paratilapia angusticeps. It was later reclassified into the genus Serranochromis. The specific epithet angusticeps is derived from the Latin angustus ("narrow") and ceps ("head"), referring to the fish's characteristically slender head and snout.
