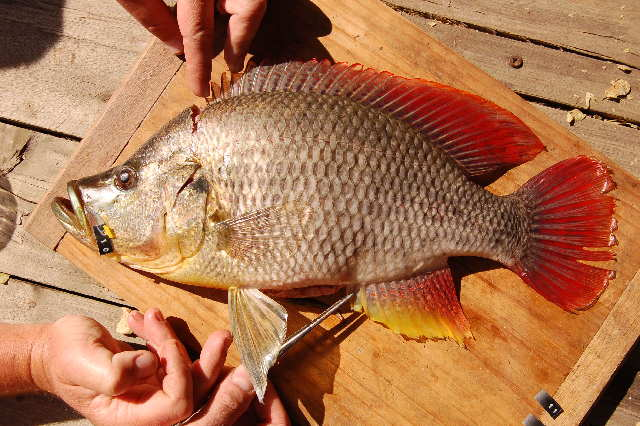

Conservation status
- Least Concern (IUCN 3.1)

Scientific classification
- Kingdom: Animalia
- Phylum: Chordata
- Class: Actinopterygii
- Order: Cichliformes
- Family: Cichlidae
- Genus: Serranochromis
- Species: S. altus

Binomial name
- Serranochromis altus Winemiller & Kelso-Winemiller, 1991

= Serranochromis altus =

Species of fish

Serranochromis altus, commonly known as the humpback largemouth, is an African species of fish in the family Cichlidae. It is found in the Okavango basin and the upper Zambezi basin, including the Kafue system. It can reach a length of 56 cm (22 in).
