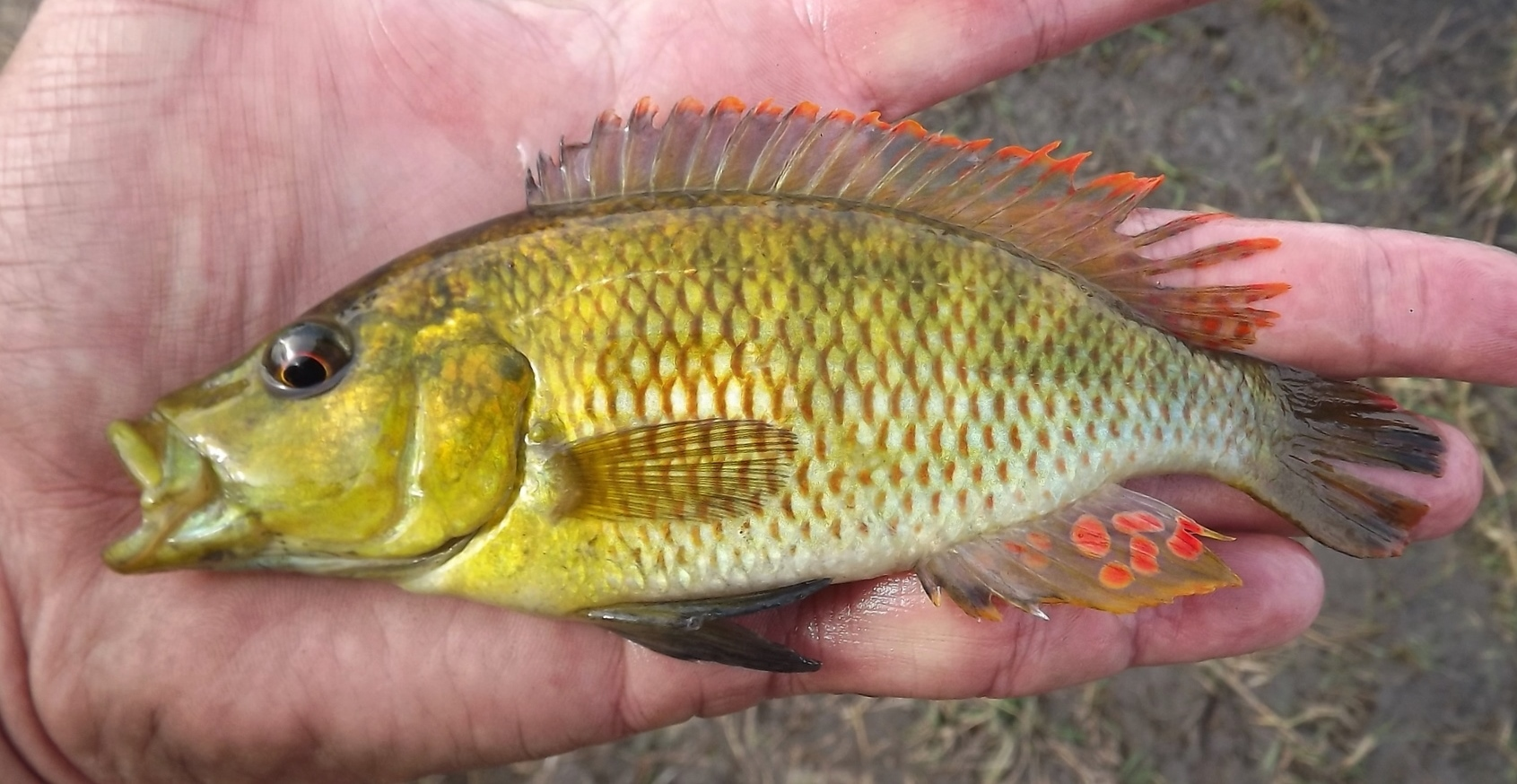

Conservation status
- Critically Endangered (IUCN 3.1)

Scientific classification
- Kingdom: Animalia
- Phylum: Chordata
- Class: Actinopterygii
- Division: Teleostei
- Order: Cichliformes
- Family: Cichlidae
- Genus: Chetia
- Species: C. brevis

Binomial name
- Chetia brevis R. A. Jubb, 1968

Synonyms
- Astatotilapia brevis (R. A. Jubb, 1968); Haplochromis brevis (R. A. Jubb, 1968) (ambiguous)

= Orange-fringed largemouth =

Species of fish

The orange-fringed largemouth (Chetia brevis), also known as the orange-fringed river bream, is a species of haplochromine cichlid native to Mozambique and South Africa. It occurs in the Komati River system in South Africa as well as in coastal lakes of Mozambique. It inhabits quiet waters with marginal vegetation and sandy substrates. This species can reach a length of 15 centimetres (5.9 in) SL. It is threatened by invasive species and alteration of its habitat.
