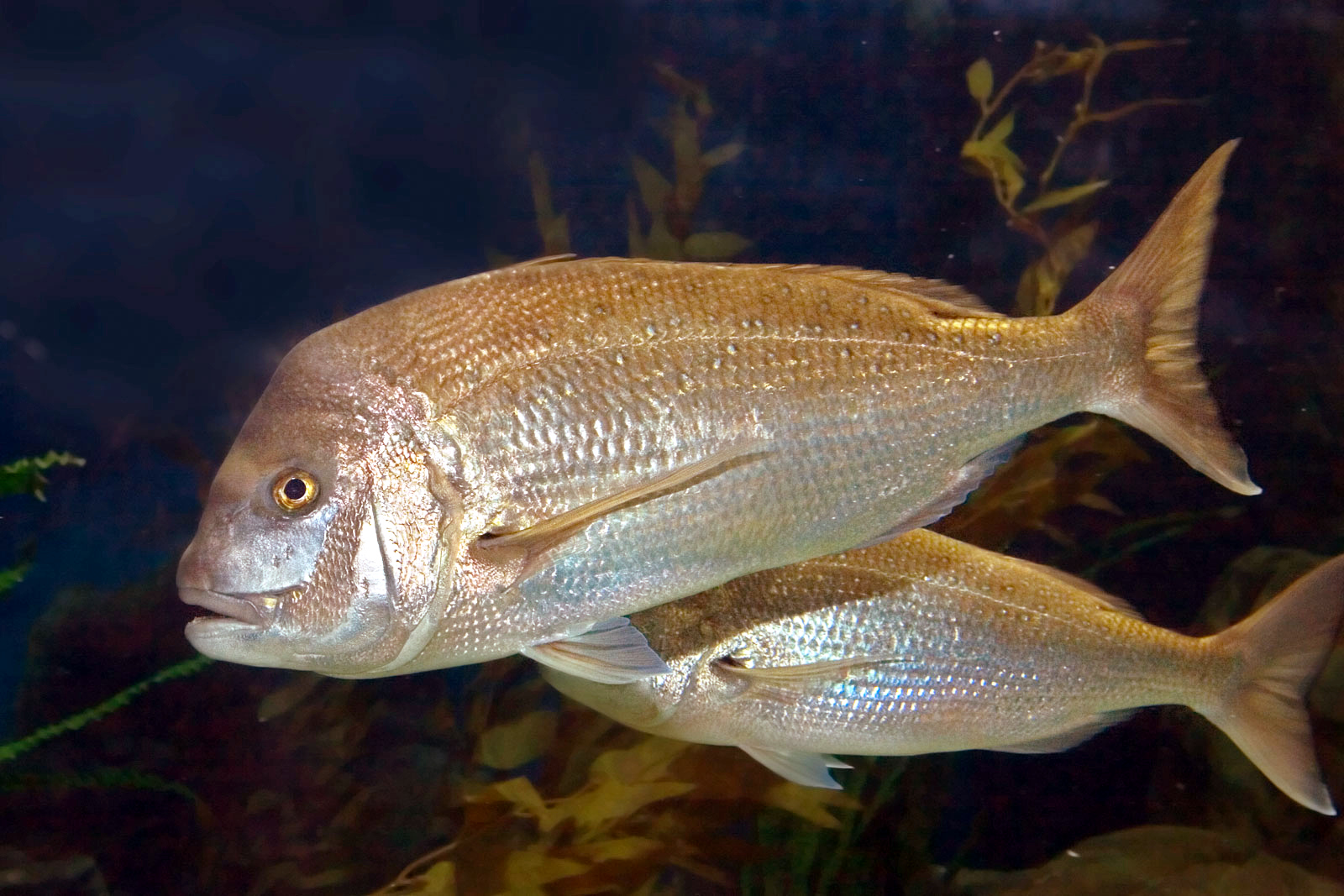
- Australasian snapper, Chrysophrys auratus, at Melbourne Aquarium.

Conservation status
- Least Concern (IUCN 3.1)

Scientific classification
- Kingdom: Animalia
- Phylum: Chordata
- Class: Actinopterygii
- Order: Acanthuriformes
- Family: Sparidae
- Genus: Chrysophrys; Quoy & Gaimard, 1824
- Species: C. auratus

Binomial name
- Chrysophrys auratus (Forster, 1801)
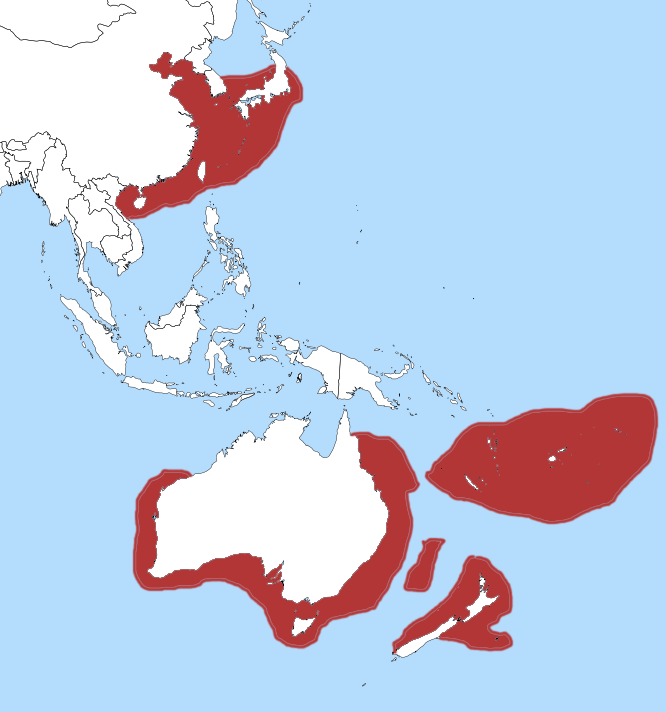
- Distribution of Australasian snapper

Synonyms
- Pagrus auratus (Forster, 1801)

= Australasian snapper =

Species of fish

The Australasian snapper (Chrysophrys auratus) or silver seabream is a species of porgie found in coastal waters of Australia, Philippines, Indonesia, mainland China, Taiwan, Japan and New Zealand. Its distribution areas in the Northern and Southern Hemispheres are disjunct. Although it is almost universally known in Australia and New Zealand as snapper, it does not belong to the Lutjanidae snapper family. It is highly prized as an edible fish, with a sweet sea taste and a firm texture.

It is the only species in the genus Chrysophrys, but was previously placed in the genus Pagrus as Pagrus auratus.

== Regional variation in naming ==
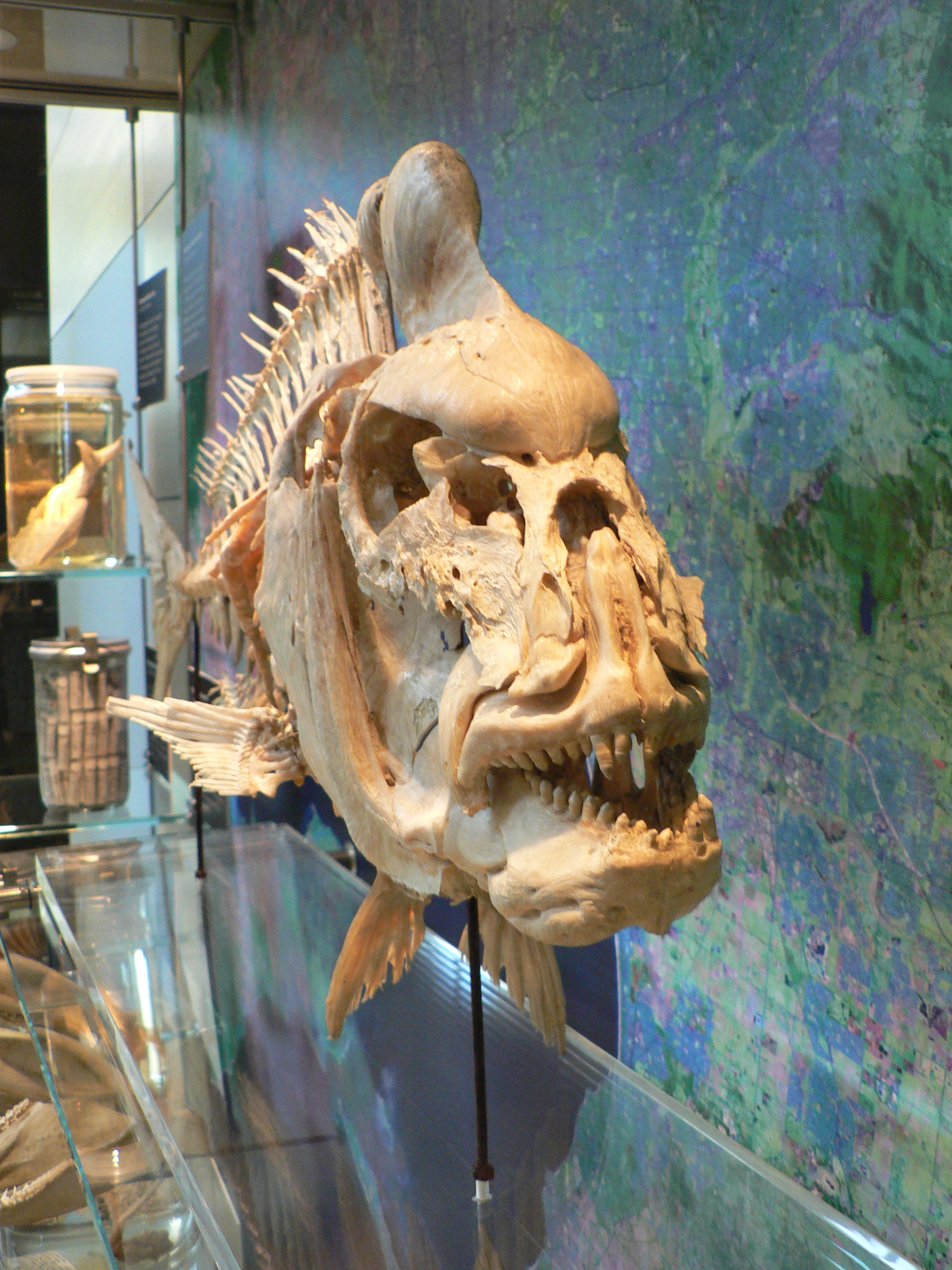
Large snapper caught off Frankston, Victoria, in 1893

Australia: cocknies (young smaller than legal size), red bream or pinkies (legal size), squire or squirefish (when bigger), snapper (at full size)

Western Australia: "pink snapper" to distinguish it from unrelated species

Victoria: also schnapper (ref: Schnapper Point, Mornington)

South Australia: the name "ruggers" is often used for smaller fish of legal size

Aboriginal people of the Port Jackson area in Australia: they called it wollamie (also spelt wollamai, and other variations). European colonists there knew it as the "light horseman", for the resemblance of the fish's skull to the helmet of a light horseman.

New Zealand: snapper (or New Zealand snapper when there is need to distinguish from other species of snapper). Māori: tāmure (adult fish), karatī (juveniles)

== Habitat ==
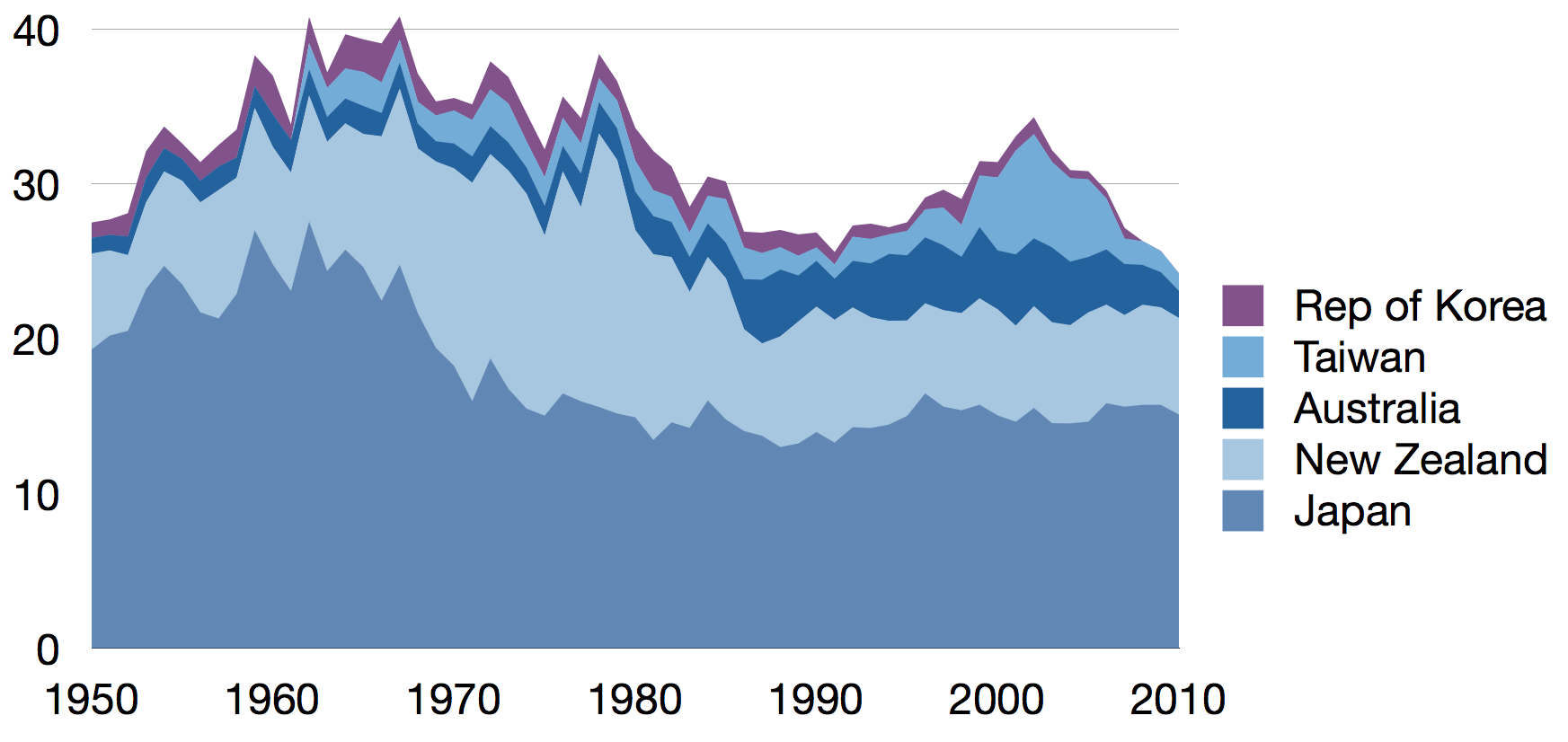
Capture of wild Australasian snapper in thousand tonnes, 1950–2010, as reported by the FAO

The Australasian snapper is found on all coasts of New Zealand, especially in the north. In Australia, it is found along the south coast, mainly near Kiama, Berry, Gerringong, Gerroa, Huskisson, Vincentia, and Shoalhaven. It is also found on the coast of Tasmania, but in smaller numbers. The fish spawn in inshore waters and live in rocky areas and reefs of up to 200 m (660 ft) deep. They school, and will migrate between reefs. Larger fish are known to enter estuaries and harbours, for example Port Phillip Bay has a renowned seasonal snapper run.

Growth rates within the wild stocks vary with some (i.e. the Hauraki Gulf, NZ) growing rapidly and to a smaller maximum length, while stocks in east and west Australia are known to grow more slowly. The species is capable of living about 40 years throughout much of its range in Australia, and the Australian recordholder of 40 years and 10 months was a 93.5 cm (36.8 in) large-nosed male, caught on 1 September 2007 off Bunbury, Western Australia, and photographed on the day of capture. Sexual maturity is reached at about 30 cm (12 in) long and a small percentage of the males will turn into females at puberty. Large individuals of both sexes develop a prominent hump on the head. Anglers are advised not to take immature fish, so as not to reduce breeding stock. The legal size in Australia varies by state, from 35 cm (14 in) and a bag limit of five fish per person in Queensland to 50 cm (20 in) in Western Australia. During spawning, these fish obtain a metallic green sheen which indicates a high concentration of acid buildup within the scales' infrastructure. Minimum sizes are supposed to be designed to allow these fish to participate in spawning runs at least once before they become available to the fishery, but given the slow growth rates of this species, a need exists to consider area closures and/or further increase the minimum sizes in each state to reduce the chances of growth overfishing of the various populations of snapper throughout its range. This may be important with recent developments in technology such as GPS.

== Relationship with humans ==
Snapper was an important traditional food for Māori, especially the tribes to the north of the North Island, where snapper bones sometimes make up the majority of archaeological middens. Snapper is known by multiple names, including tāmure, a word to describe adults, and karatī, a word describing juvenile fish.

There are numerous traditional ways to prepare the fish. One specific to snapper was kaniwha, where the meat would be submerged in fresh water and squeezed numerous times, then eaten raw. The nene (base of the tongue) was considered the most prestigious part of the fish to eat.

== Fisheries ==
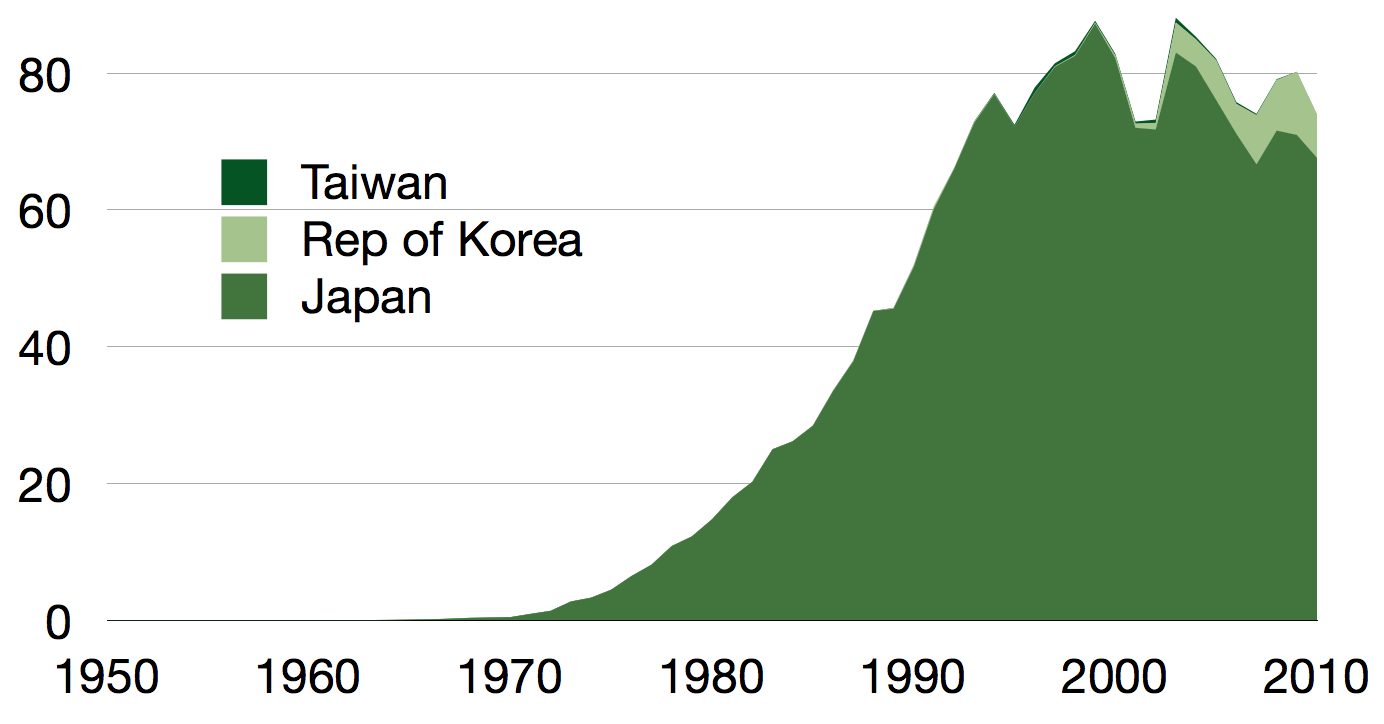
Aquaculture production of farmed Australasian snapper in thousand tonnes, 1950–2010, as reported by the FAO

Capture (blue) and aquaculture (green) production of Silver seabream (Pagrus auratus) in thousand tonnes from 1950 to 2022, as reported by the FAO

Catches of Australasian snapper have varied between 25,600 and 34,300 tonnes in 2000–2009, with Japan and New Zealand reporting the largest catches.

== See also ==
- Cape Woolamai, named after the fish
- Porgie fishing
