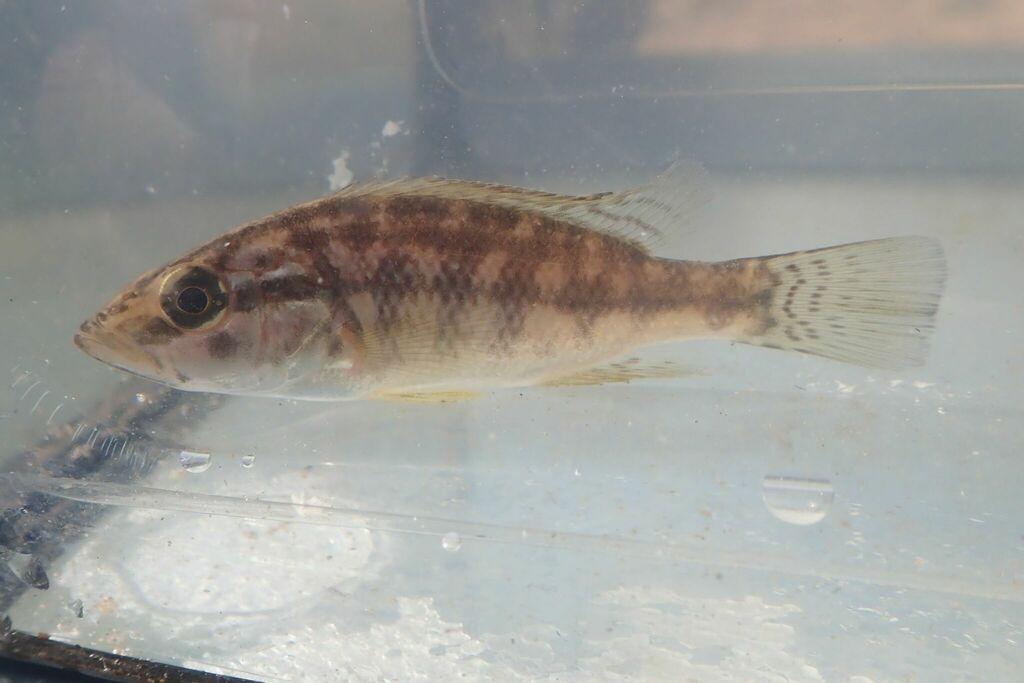

Conservation status
- Endangered (IUCN 3.1)

Scientific classification
- Kingdom: Animalia
- Phylum: Chordata
- Class: Actinopterygii
- Order: Cichliformes
- Family: Cichlidae
- Genus: Serranochromis
- Species: S. meridianus

Binomial name
- Serranochromis meridianus R. A. Jubb, 1967

= Lowveld largemouth =

Species of fish

The lowveld largemouth (Serranochromis meridianus) is a species of cichlid native to lakes and rivers of South Africa and Mozambique. This species can reach a length of 37 centimetres (15 in) TL. It is popular as a gamefish.
