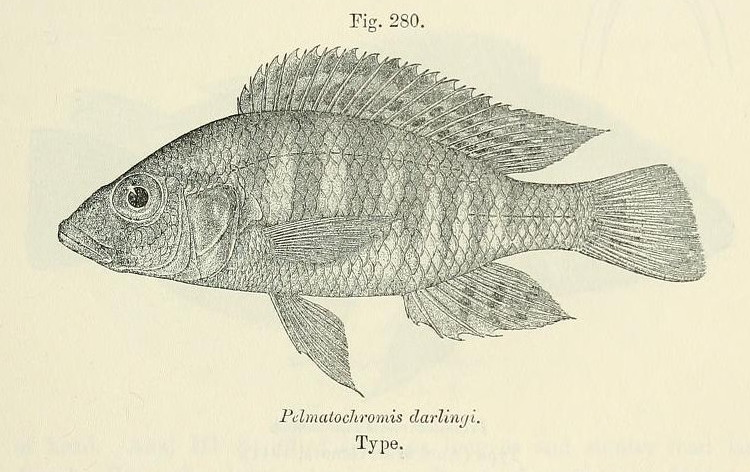
- Pharyngochromis darlingi

Scientific classification
- Kingdom: Animalia
- Phylum: Chordata
- Class: Actinopterygii
- Division: Teleostei
- Order: Cichliformes
- Family: Cichlidae
- Tribe: Haplochromini
- Genus: Pharyngochromis; Greenwood, 1979

Type species
- Pelmatochromis darlingi Boulenger, 1911

= Pharyngochromis =

Genus of fishes

Pharyngochromis is a genus of cichlids native to Southern Africa where they are only known from the Zambezi, Okavango, Save–Runde and Kunene basins. There are two species, which reach up to 12 and 22 cm (4.5 and 8.5 in) in total length, respectively.

== Species and taxonomy ==
There are currently two recognized species in this genus:

- Pharyngochromis acuticeps (Steindachner, 1866) (Zambezi Bream)
- Pharyngochromis darlingi (Boulenger, 1911) (Zambezi Happy)

A few other, possibly undescribed species are known.

Pharyngochromis, along with Chetia, Sargochromis, Serranochromis and others, form a group sometimes known as the serranochromines or Serranochromini. How many other genera are included varies, with some defining the group relatively narrowly and others broadly.
