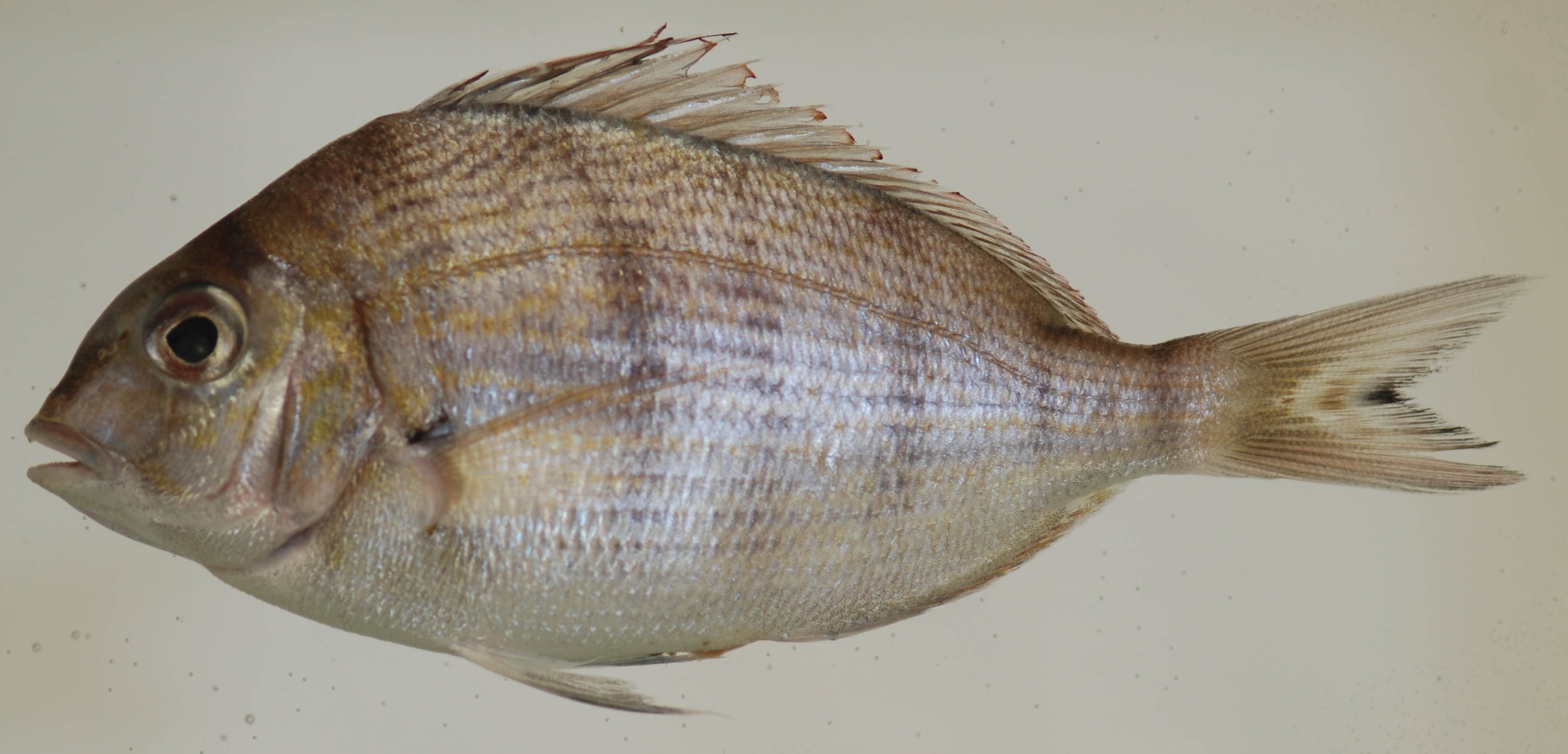
- Stenotomus chrysops

Scientific classification
- Kingdom: Animalia
- Phylum: Chordata
- Class: Actinopterygii
- Order: Acanthuriformes
- Family: Sparidae
- Genus: Stenotomus; Gill, 1865

Type species
- Sparus argyrops Linnaeus, 1766

Synonyms
- Mimocubiceps Fowler, 1944; Otrynter D. S. Jordan & Evermann, 1896; Stenesthes D. S. Jordan, 1917

= Stenotomus =

Genus of fishes

Stenotomus is a genus of marine ray-finned fish belonging to the family Sparidae, which includes the seabreams and porgies. The fishes in this genus are found in the western Atlantic Ocean.

== Taxonomy ==
Stenotomus was first proposed as a monospecific genus in 1864 by the American biologist Theodore Gill with Sparus argyrops as its only species. S. argyrops was first formally described by Carl Linnaeus in Systema naturae sive regna tria naturae published in 1766 with its type localities given as Carolina and Jamaica. Sp. aryrops is now regarded as a junior synonym of Sparus chrysops. This genus is classified in the family Sparidae within the order Spariformes by the 5th edition of Fishes of the World. Some authorities classify this genus in the subfamily Pagellinae, but the 5th edition of Fishes of the World does not recognise subfamilies within the Sparidae.

== Etymology ==
Stenotomus combines stenos, meaning "narrow", and tomos, meaning "cutting", an allusion to the slender incisors these fishes possess.

== Species ==
Stemotomus contains two recognized species:

- Stenotomus caprinus D. S. Jordan & Gilbert, 1882 (Longspine porgy)
- Stenotomus chrysops (Linnaeus, 1766) (Scup)

== Characteristics ==
Stenotomus porgies have deep and compressed bodies. The dorsal profile of the head is steep, the head is not very deep below the eye. The margin of the preoperculum is smooth. The small mouth opens at the front and the preorbital bone overlaps with the rear of the maxilla. The teeth in the front of the jaws are highly flattened incisors, thinner at the base and at the tips. There are rows of molars at the sides of the jaws. The dorsal fin contains 13 spines with the 1st spine being recumbent and the anal fin contains 3 spines. The pectoral fin is long and the caudal fin is forked. There are scales on the cheeks and the operculum, although there are no scales at the front of the head. The largest species is the scup with a maximum published total length of 46 cm (18 in), while the longspine porgy has a maximum published total length of 30 cm (12 in).

== Distribution ==
Stenotomus porgies are found in the western Atlantic Ocean between Nova Scotia and the Yucatán Peninsula.
