= Chetia brevicauda =

Conservation status
- Least Concern (IUCN 3.1)

Scientific classification
- Kingdom: Animalia
- Phylum: Chordata
- Class: Actinopterygii
- Order: Cichliformes
- Family: Cichlidae
- Genus: Chetia
- Species: C. brevicauda

Binomial name
- Chetia brevicauda I. R. Bills & Olaf, 2002

Species of fish

Chetia brevicauda is a species of fish in the cichlid family. The fish is found in Mozambique. The fish grows up to 12.5 centimetres (4.9 in) long (SL).

== Status ==
In 2007, the IUCN evaluated Chetia brevicauda and listed the species as Least Concern.
