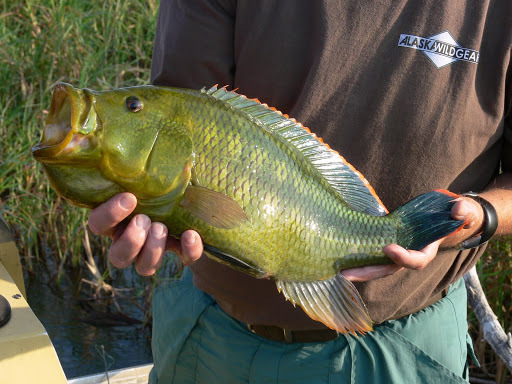

Scientific classification
- Kingdom: Animalia
- Phylum: Chordata
- Class: Actinopterygii
- Order: Cichliformes
- Family: Cichlidae
- Genus: Serranochromis
- Species: S. jallae

Binomial name
- Serranochromis jallae (Boulenger, 1896)

Synonyms
- Paratilapia jallae Boulenger, 1896

= Serranochromis jallae =

Species of ray-finned fish

Serranochromis jallae, commonly known as the nembwe, is a large species of predatory cichlid fish found in the freshwater systems of south-central Africa. It is a member of the piscivorous genus Serranochromis and is a popular game fish.
