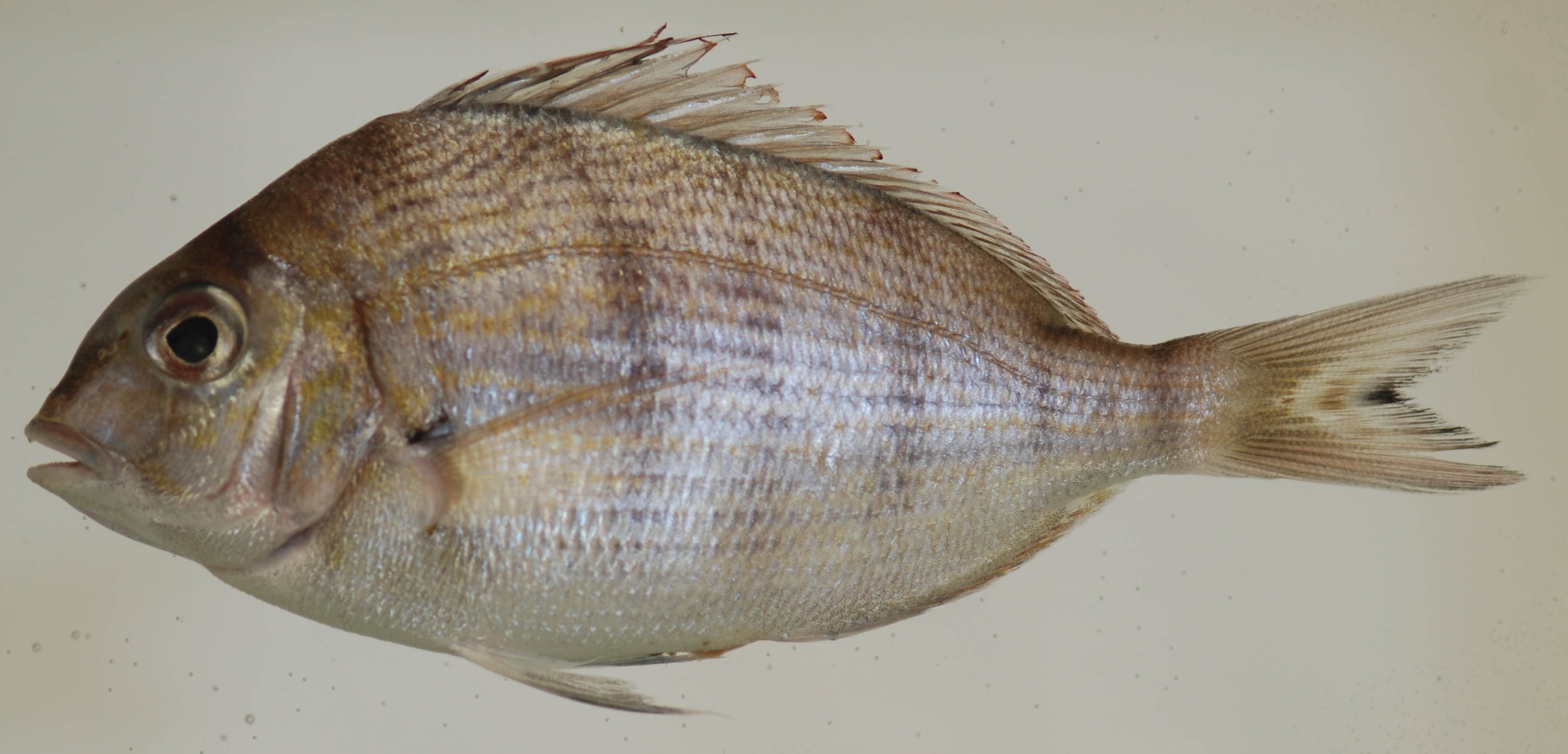

Conservation status
- Near Threatened (IUCN 3.1)

Scientific classification
- Kingdom: Animalia
- Phylum: Chordata
- Class: Actinopterygii
- Order: Acanthuriformes
- Family: Sparidae
- Genus: Stenotomus
- Species: S. chrysops

Binomial name
- Stenotomus chrysops (Linnaeus, 1766)

Synonyms
- Sparus chrysops Linnaeus, 1766; Sparus argyrops Linnaeus, 1766; Sparus zanthurus Lacépède, 1802; Sparus violaceus Shaw, 1803; Labrus versicolor Mitchill, 1815; Chrysophrys aculeata Valenciennes, 1830; Sargus arenosus De Kay, 1842; Cynaedus brama Gronow, 1854; Sargus ambassis Günther, 1859; Mimocubiceps virginiae Fowler, 1944

= Scup =

Species of fish

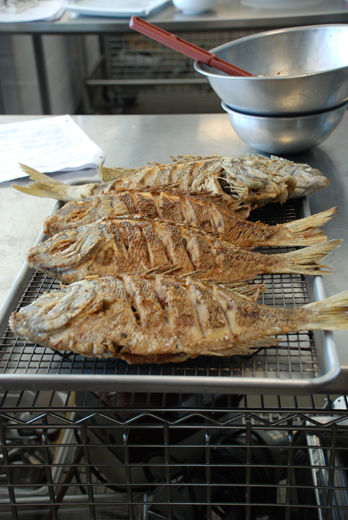
Flash-fried whole scup

The scup (Stenotomus chrysops) is a fish that occurs primarily in the Atlantic from Massachusetts to South Carolina. Along with many other fish of the family Sparidae, it is also commonly known as porgy.

Scup grow as large as 18 in (460 mm) and weigh 3–4 lb (1.4–1.8 kg), but they average 0.5–1.0 lb (0.23–0.45 kg). Scup can live up to 20 years; females can begin to reproduce at the age of two. Every year female scups lay approximately 7,000 eggs in sand and weed abundant areas.

In the Middle Atlantic Bight, scup spawn along the inner continental shelf. Their larvae end up in inshore waters, along the coast and in estuarine areas. At two to three years of age, they mature. Scup winter along the mid and outer continental shelf. When the temperature warms in the spring, they migrate inshore.

They are fished for by both commercial and recreational fishermen. The scup fishery is one of the oldest in the United States, with records dating back to 1800. Scup was the most abundant fish in colonial times. Fishermen began using trawls in 1929, which increased catches dramatically. The species was termed overfished in 1996, and today there is evidence of a rebound. Today, scup are still caught primarily using an otter trawl.

== Cuisine ==
The flesh is "firm and flaky", with a "sweet almost shrimplike flavor". Many consumers like their light flavor and they are characterized as panfish. Popular methods of cooking include frying, broiling, and baking.

Though the flesh is similar to that of more prestigious fish in the sea bream family like daurade and orata, the names "scup" and "porgy" are sometimes considered unattractive, leading to culinary names like orata Americana and Montauk sea bream.

Its similarity to Pagrus major and its mild and fatty characteristics makes it suitable for sushi.

== Management ==
Scup are heavily fished commercially and recreationally. Management measures for the species generally include size limits, bag limits, fishing seasons, and equipment requirements. Scup are also managed through quotas that are separately regulated during the different seasons. In Massachusetts, management plans result in the distribution of 78% of the yearly permitted harvest of scups for commercial purposes, and 22% for recreational fishing.

== Fishing ==
Since scups attack bait frantically, squid strips are the most common choice of bait because they stay intact and suspended on the hook after several strikes. Anglers also use sand-worms and clam as baits for scup due to clams and worms being part of the scups actual diet.

== See also ==
- Porgy fishing
