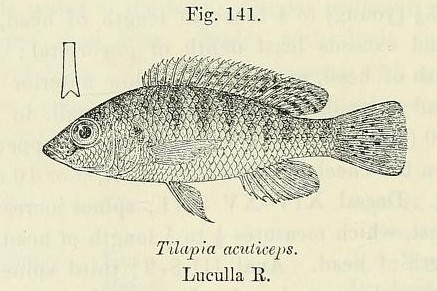

Conservation status
- Least Concern (IUCN 3.1)

Scientific classification
- Kingdom: Animalia
- Phylum: Chordata
- Class: Actinopterygii
- Order: Cichliformes
- Family: Cichlidae
- Genus: Pharyngochromis
- Species: P. acuticeps

Binomial name
- Pharyngochromis acuticeps Steindachner, 1866

Synonyms
- Chromis acuticeps Steindachner, 1866; Haplochromis acuticeps (Steindachner, 1866); Tilapia acuticeps (Steindachner, 1866); Chromis jallae Boulenger, 1896; Haplochromis jallae (Boulenger, 1896); Tilapia jallae (Boulenger, 1896)

= Zambezi bream =

Species of fish

Zambezi bream (Pharyngochromis acuticeps), also known as dwarf bream, is a species of haplochromine cichlid which is found in river systems in southern Africa.

== Description ==
The Zambezi bream is a medium-sized species of haplochromine which has a large head with a rounded snout and an slightly, upward pointing mouth. It has a slender body with a relatively straight outline, a long dorsal fin and a truncated caudal fin. The dorsal fin contains 14-16 spines and 10-13 soft rays while the anal fin has 2 spines and 7-10 soft rays. The lateral line is in two sections and contains 36 scales. The body is brown in colour on the upperside which his marked by darker brown bars, with the colour becoming iridescent green towards the belly. The scales have red in their centres and there are red dots on the parts of the dorsal and anal fins supported by rays, while the tail has brown spots and there are orange egg imitating spots on the anal fin. They grow to a total length of 12 centimetres (4.7 in).

== Distribution ==
The Zambezi bream is found in the upper and middle catchments of the Zambezi River system in Zambia, Zimbabwe and Namibia, in the upper Save River and upper Runde River in Zimbabwe and in the Chobe River, Okavango River and Cunene River in Botswana, Namibia and Angola. A population in the Mwekera, a tributary of the Kafue River may represent a separate species. Although some sources state that it is absent in the Cunene.

== Habitat and biology ==
The Zambezi bream is found in the margins of river channels and tributaries where there is a slower current as well as in lagoons and floodplains dominated by sawgrass, wherever there is an abundance of aquatic plants or tangles of tree roots. They are predators which feed on molluscs especially snails and freshwater mussels, as well as freshwater crustaceans and insect larvae and the eggs and fry of other fishes. It is preyed on by cormorants and African darters and also by subsistence fishermen. Spawning takes place in the summer and the female takes a brood of 800 eggs into her mouth after spawning, she also mouthbroods the fry. They have a lifespan of 3–4 years. This species is possibly an important intermediate host of the parasitic nematodes of the genus Contracaecum, the ultimate hosts being the piscivorous birds which frequently feed on Zambezi bream including white-breasted cormorant, long-tailed cormorant, African darter and grey heron.
