= Chetia mola =

Conservation status
- Endangered (IUCN 3.1)

Scientific classification
- Kingdom: Animalia
- Phylum: Chordata
- Class: Actinopterygii
- Division: Teleostei
- Order: Cichliformes
- Family: Cichlidae
- Genus: Chetia
- Species: C. mola

Binomial name
- Chetia mola Balon & Stewart, 1983

Species of fish

Chetia mola is an endangered species of fish in the family Cichlidae. It is found in the Luongo River of Zaire.

== See also ==
- Luena River, Zambia
