= Serranochromis janus =

Conservation status
- Data Deficient (IUCN 3.1)

Scientific classification
- Kingdom: Animalia
- Phylum: Chordata
- Class: Actinopterygii
- Order: Cichliformes
- Family: Cichlidae
- Genus: Serranochromis
- Species: S. janus

Binomial name
- Serranochromis janus Trewavas, 1964

Species of fish

Serranochromis janus is a species of cichlid endemic to the Malagarasi River in Tanzania preferring areas with plentiful vegetation and slow currents. This species can reach a length of 35 centimetres (14 in) SL.
