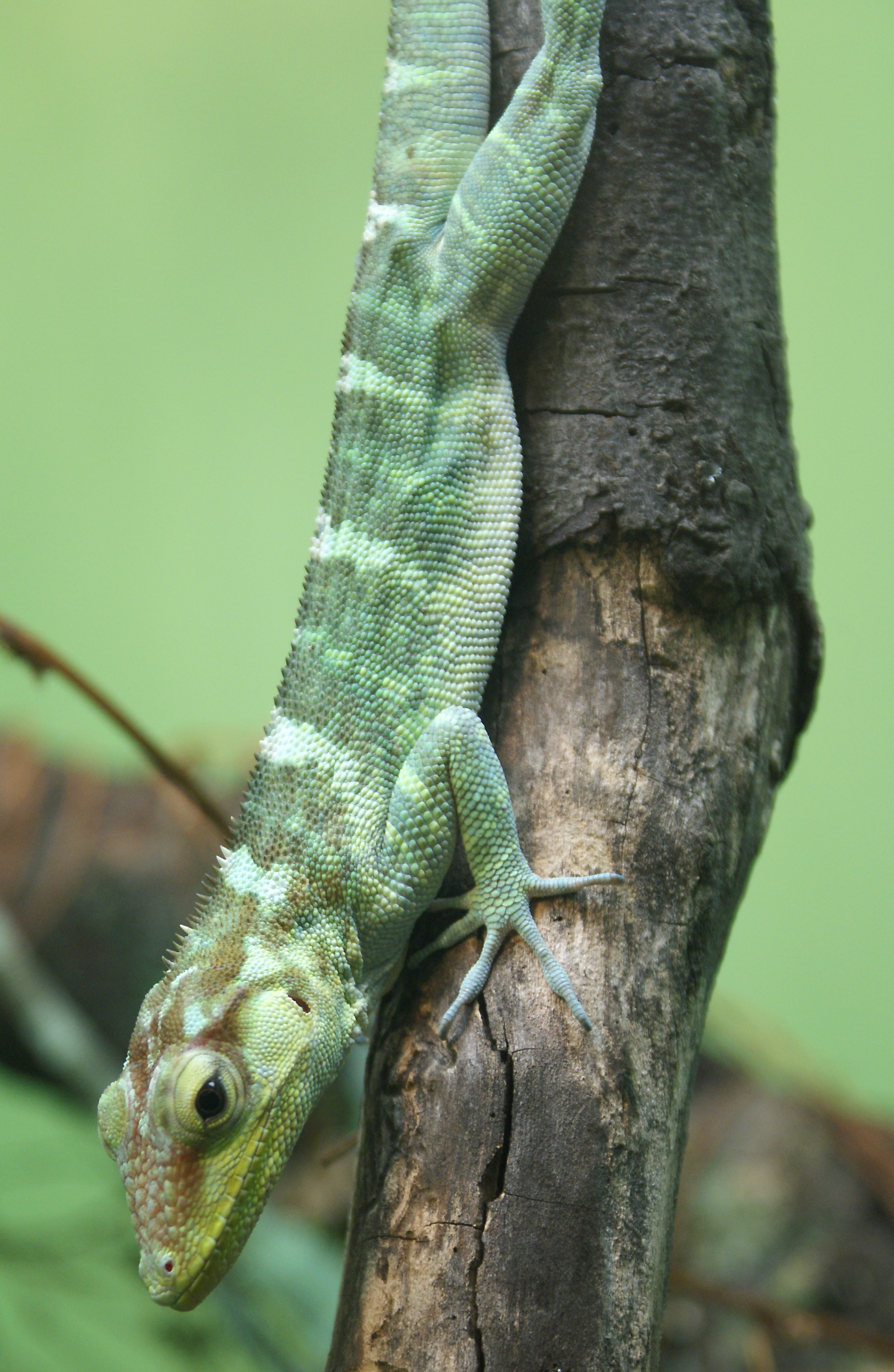

Scientific classification
- Kingdom: Animalia
- Phylum: Chordata
- Class: Reptilia
- Order: Squamata
- Suborder: Iguania
- Family: Dactyloidae
- Genus: Anolis
- Species: A. ricordii

Binomial name
- Anolis ricordii Duméril & Bibron, 1837

= Anolis ricordii =

Species of lizard

Anolis ricordii, the Haitian giant anole or Haitian green anole, is a species of lizard in the family Dactyloidae. The species is found in Haiti and the Dominican Republic.
