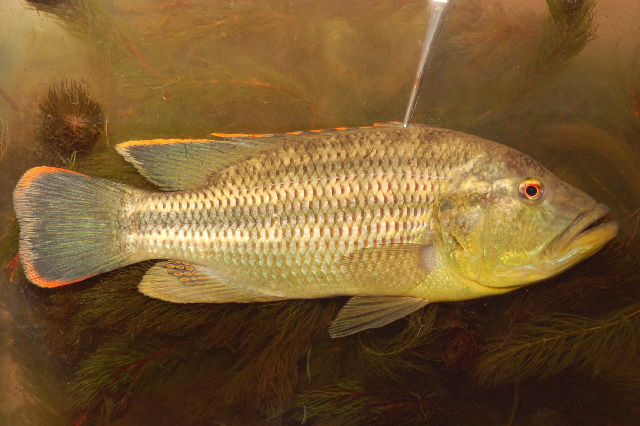
- Adult Serranochromis robustus

Scientific classification
- Kingdom: Animalia
- Phylum: Chordata
- Class: Actinopterygii
- Order: Cichliformes
- Family: Cichlidae
- Genus: Serranochromis
- Species: S. robustus

Binomial name
- Serranochromis robustus (Günther, 1864)

Synonyms
- Hemichromis robustus Günther, 1864

= Serranochromis robustus =

Species of ray-finned fish

Serranochromis robustus, commonly known as the yellow-belly bream, is a large species of predatory cichlid fish endemic to the freshwater systems of southern Africa. it is a member of the piscivorous genus Serranochromis.

== Taxonomy and naming ==
The species was first formally described in 1864 by the German-born British zoologist Albert Günther, who initially placed it in the genus Hemichromis as Hemichromis robustus. It was later reclassified into the genus Serranochromis. The specific epithet robustus is Latin for "hard and strong," referring to the fish's powerful, sturdy build. The common name "nembwe" is of local origin and is widely used across its range.
