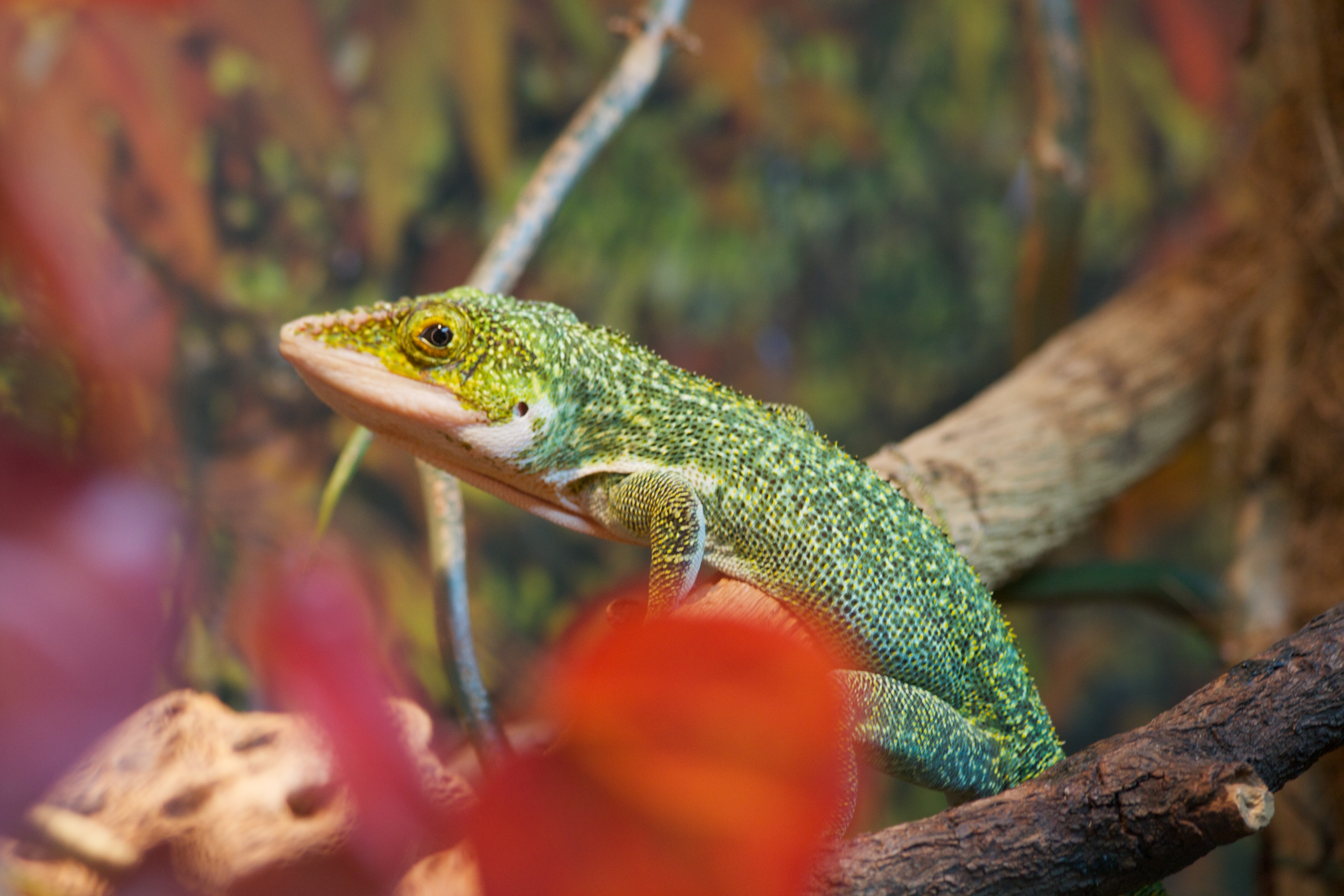

Conservation status
- Least Concern (IUCN 3.1)

Scientific classification
- Kingdom: Animalia
- Phylum: Chordata
- Class: Reptilia
- Order: Squamata
- Suborder: Iguania
- Family: Dactyloidae
- Genus: Anolis
- Species: A. luteogularis

Binomial name
- Anolis luteogularis Noble & Hassler, 1935

= Anolis luteogularis =

Species of lizard

Anolis luteogularis, the western giant anole or white-throated anole, is a species of lizard in the family Dactyloidae. The species is found in Cuba.

== Subspecies ==
- Anolis luteogularis calceus Schwartz & Garrido, 1972
- Anolis luteogularis coctilis Schwartz & Garrido, 1972
- Anolis luteogularis delacruzi Schwartz & Garrido, 1972
- Anolis luteogularis hassleri Barbour & Shreve, 1935
- Anolis luteogularis jaumei Schwartz & Garrido, 1972
- Anolis luteogularis luteogularis Noble & Hassler, 1935
- Anolis luteogularis nivevultus Schwartz & Garrido, 1972
- Anolis luteogularis sanfelipensis Garrido, 1975
- Anolis luteogularis sectilis Schwartz & Garrido, 1972

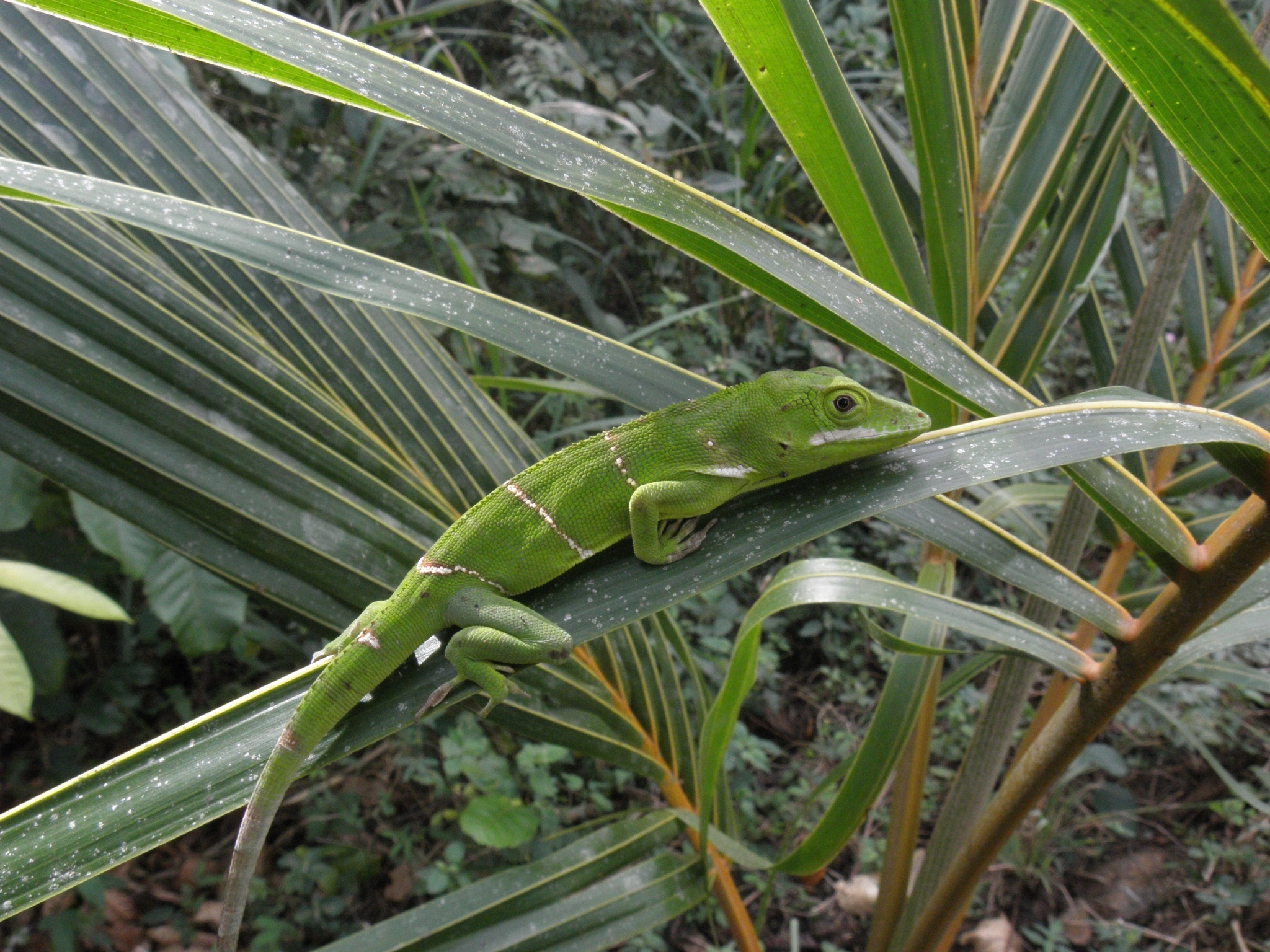
Juvenile western giant anole
