= Porgy fishing =

Type of fish

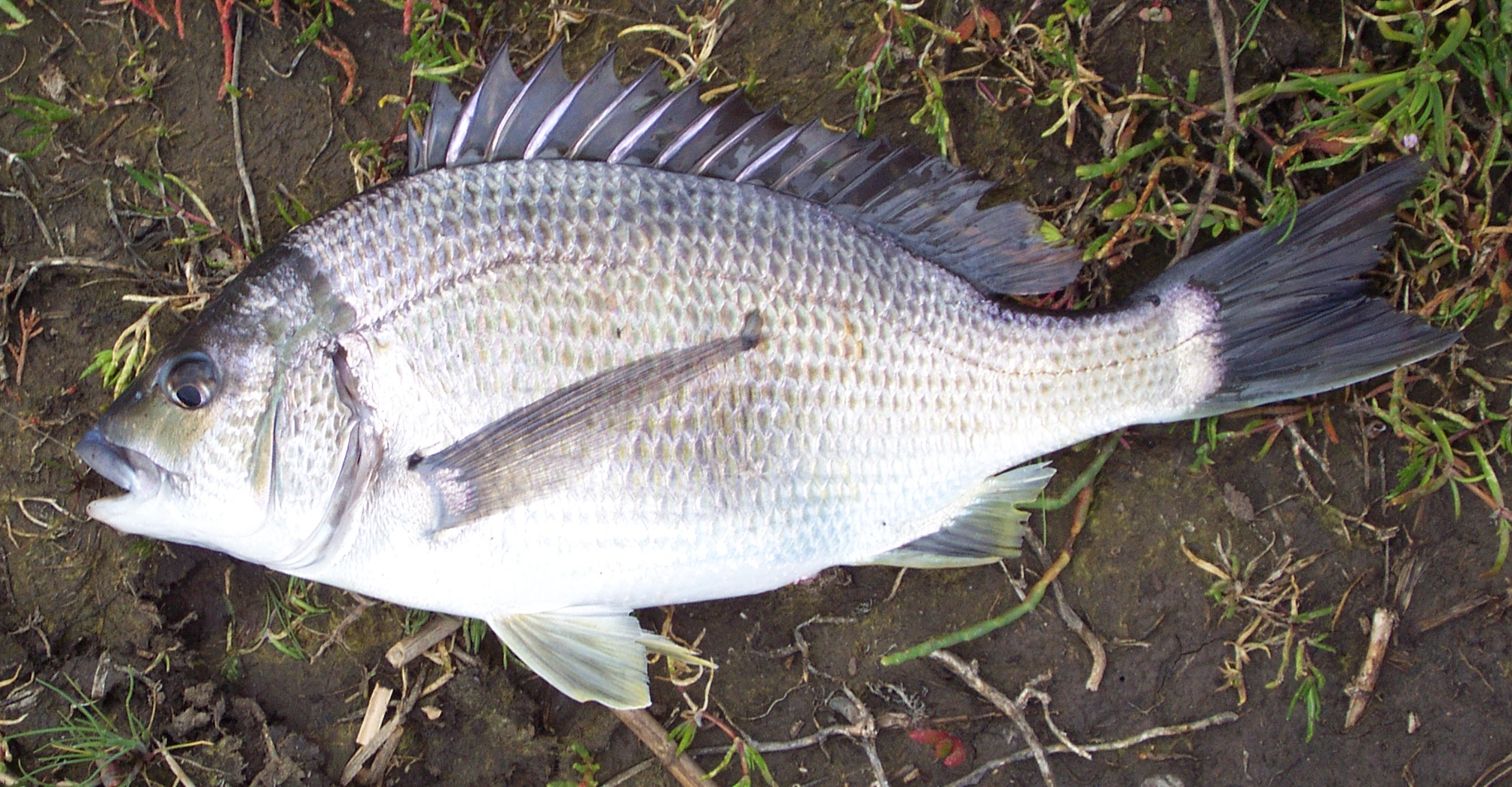
A southern black bream caught from Snowy River, Australia

Porgy is the common name in Australia for any fish which belongs to the family Sparidae. They are also called bream. Porgies live in shallow temperate marine waters and are bottom-dwelling carnivores. Most species possess grinding, molar-like teeth. They are often good eating fish, particularly the gilt-head bream and the dentex.

== European ==
=== Gilt-head bream ===
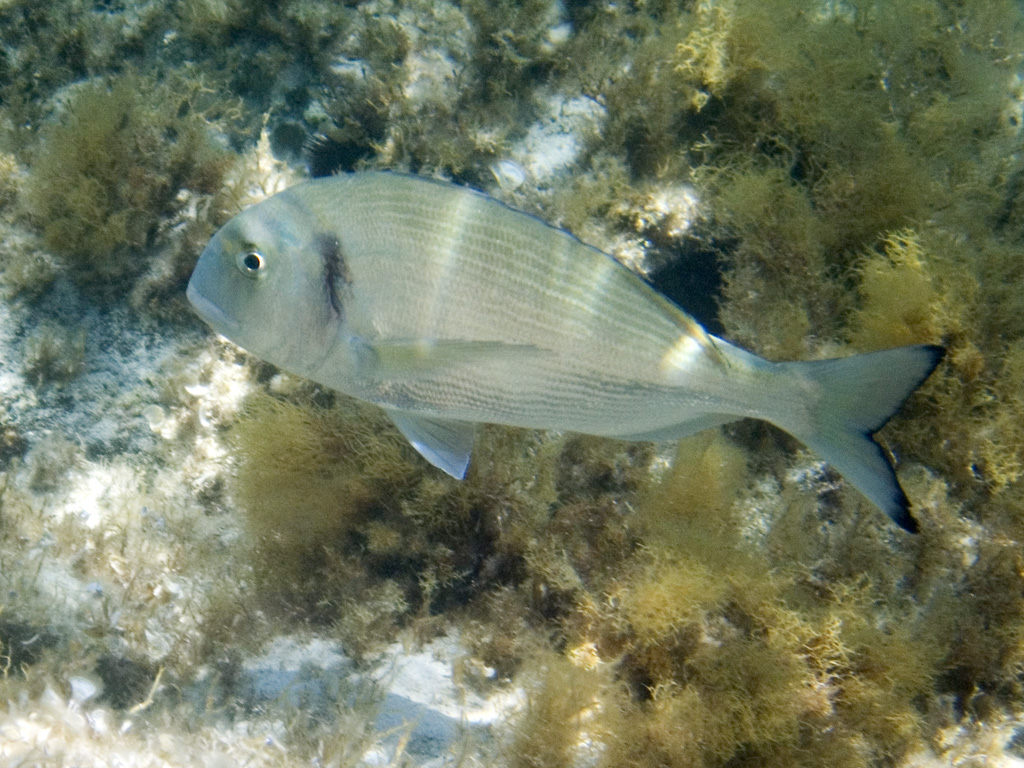
Gilt-head bream

The gilt-head bream is found in the Mediterranean Sea and the eastern coastal regions of the North Atlantic Ocean. It grows to about 60 cm long. Found in seagrass beds and sandy bottoms as well as in the surf zone commonly to depths of about 30 m, but adults may occur to 150 m depth. A sedentary fish, either solitary or in small aggregations. In spring, they often occur in brackish water coastal lagoons and estuaries. Mainly carnivorous, accessorily herbivorous. Feed on shellfish, including mussels and oysters.

The gilt-head bream is generally considered the best-tasting of the breams and has given the whole family of Sparidae its name. In Portugal the fish is referred to as "Golden Bream," "Orata," or "Dourada," and is widely available as a fresh fish meal in local restaurants along the Algarve. It is called the "dorada" in neighboring Spain, where it is also highly prized. The same happens in Italy, where the fish is called "orata". Ιn Turkey the fish is referred to as "çipura" or "çupra". In Greece and Cyprus as "tsipoúra" (τσιπούρα). In Croatia as "orada", "lovrata" or "komarča". In Malta it is called "awrata".

=== Common pandora ===
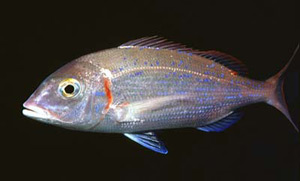
Common pandora

The common pandora is found in the Atlantic Ocean from Scandinavia to Cape Verde, and in the Mediterranean and the North Sea. A typical specimen measures 10–30 cm, but it can reach as much as 50 cm in length. It is omnivorous, but mainly feeds on smaller fish and benthic invertebrates.

It is a popular game and food fish in Mediterranean countries, with delicate white flesh.

=== Common dentex ===
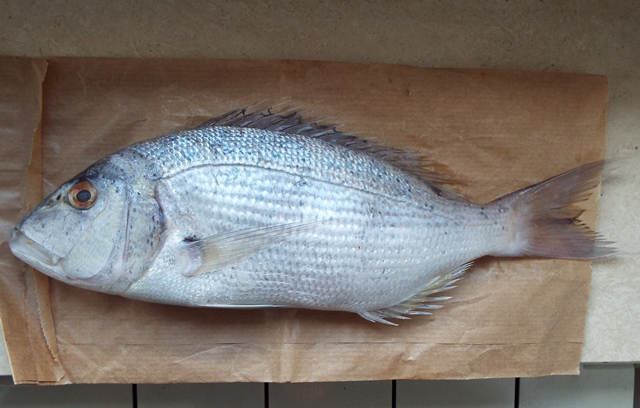
Common dentex

The common dentex is found in the Mediterranean Sea, the Black Sea and the Eastern Atlantic Ocean from the British Isles to Mauritania, sometimes up to Senegal and Canary Islands. It lives in sandy or stony deeps, to 200 m, and is an active predator, feeding on other fish, mollusca and cephalopods. It is usually solitary, although younger dentex form schools and are less elusive. Adult dentex can reach a length of one metre, and weigh up to 14 kg.

=== Black seabream ===
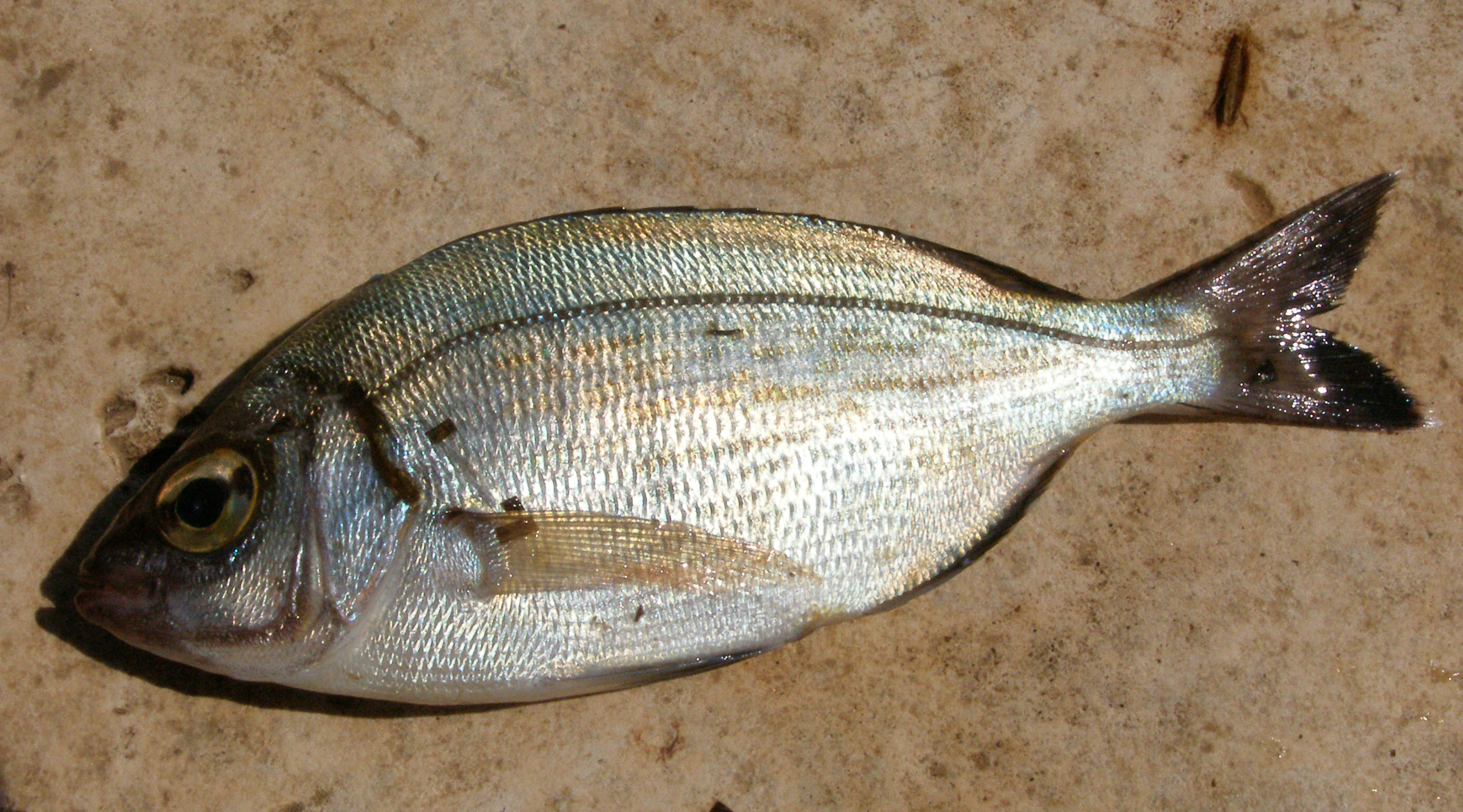
Black seabream

The black seabream live in northern Europe and in the Mediterranean, usually found on the inshore shelf at depths varying from 5 to 300 m. They are usually found in schools feeding on seaweeds and invertebrates. They can reach a maximum size of 60 cm in length. They are protogynous meaning females have the ability to change to males.

== North American ==
=== Scup ===
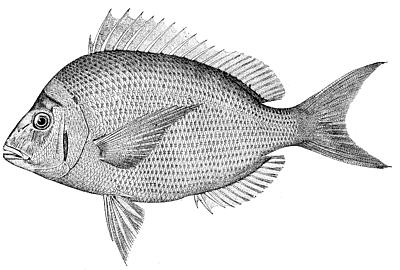
Scup

Scup occur primarily in the Atlantic from Massachusetts to South Carolina. They grow as large as 18 in (450 mm) and weigh 3 to 4 lb (2 kg), but they average 1/2 - 1 lb (0.5 kg).

In the Middle Atlantic Bight, scup spawn along the inner continental shelf. Their larvae end up in inshore waters, along the coast and in estuarine areas. At 2 to 3 years of age, they mature. Scup winter along the mid and outer continental shelf. When the temperature warms in the spring they migrate inshore.

They are fished by recreational fishermen and are a fine eating fish. The current IGFA all tackle record is 2.06 kilograms (4 lb 9oz), caught in 1992 in Nantucket Sound, Massachusetts.

=== Sheepshead ===
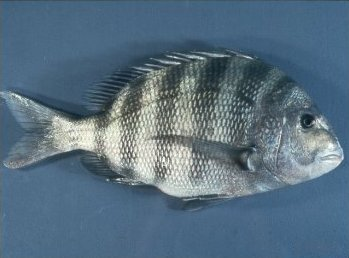
Sheepshead

The sheepshead grows to 30 in (760 mm), but are common from 5 to 8 in. They have a very hard mouth with several rows of stubby teeth which help crush prey. Their range extends from Texas into the mid-Atlantic. During the winters, many anglers in south US states will head to the end of a pier to fish for sheepshead.

As sheepshead are crustacean and bivalve feeders, favorite baits include shrimp, sand fleas (molecrabs), clams, and mussels. Sheepshead have a knack for stealing bait, so a very small hook is necessary. Locating sheepshead in a boat is not very difficult: look for rocky bottoms or places with obstruction, or try around the pilings of a bridge or pier. The average size of a sheepshead is in the 3-4 pound range, but some can be caught that are in the 10-15 lb range.

== Southern oceans ==
=== Southern black bream ===
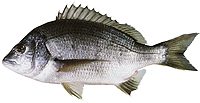
Southern black bream

The southern black bream (also known as the black bream, southern bream and blue-nosed bream) is a species of marine and freshwater fish of the porgy family, Sparidae. It is a deep-bodied fish, occasionally confused with other similar species that occur within its range, but is generally distinguished from these species by a lack of yellow ventral and anal fins. Southern black bream are endemic to Australia, inhabiting the southern coast from Shark Bay in Western Australia to Mallacoota, Victoria, as well as Tasmania.

The species is primarily an inhabitant of estuaries and coastal lakes, rarely entering the ocean, as it cannot complete its life cycle in a fully marine environment. During the breeding season, the species is known to penetrate into the upper reaches of rivers to spawn, causing an influx of juveniles in the estuaries a few months later. Southern black bream are opportunistic predators, consuming a wide range of crustaceans, molluscs, polychaetes and fish.

The southern black bream is a major target for recreational fishermen due to its high quality flesh and its sporting qualities. The development of lure fishing for bream has added to its attraction.

Southern black bream have long been a favourite target for anglers who seek out the species for both its fighting qualities and high quality flesh. Bream are also popular due to their accessibility, with fish commonly caught from harbour and estuary banks, piers and rock walls, therefore eliminating the need for a boat in most regions. Research in Western Australia has shown that anglers take more bream than commercial fishermen, with a 1979 study indicating that at least 232 tonnes were taken, more than double that of the commercial harvest at its peak, although with the advent of catch and release fishing this figure has dropped.

Bream are commonly caught around structures within an estuary, including fallen branches, piers, rock walls, bridge abutments and other man made structures as well as on mud and sand banks where shellfish and crustaceans dwell. Although bream are opportunistic feeders, they can often be very difficult to catch in areas subject to high fishing pressure. Light fishing lines and sinkers are used to avoid spooking the fish and, as with all fishing, live bait produces the best results. Various crustaceans such as nippers, prawns and crabs are commonly used alongside various species of beach and tube worm. Frozen and cut bait such as prawns, mussels, cockles and fish pieces are also effective. Rigs are usually kept simple and light, with running ball or bean sinkers used on a light line from two up to four kilograms in breaking strength tied to a size 6 - 1 hook. In fast flowing waters, heavier sinkers may be needed to keep the bait in the target area long enough to be noticed by a fish. Burley is often introduced into the water, with chopped pilchards or chicken pellets soaked in fish oil popular amongst anglers. In recent years, the use of lures and flies on southern black bream has been successfully developed, with the species known to attack both hard bodied minnow and spinnerbait type lures, as well as soft plastic lures and saltwater flies.

The southern black bream is protected by size and bag limits in all the states it inhabits, which anglers must be aware of or face fines. In Western Australia the size limit is 25 cm with only 2 fish over 40 cm allowed to be taken from the Swan or Canning Rivers, while the bag limit varies throughout the state with West Coast allowing 4 per angler, Gascoyne 8 per angler, and Southern and Northern 20 per angler. In South Australia the daily bag limit is 10 per person, with a minimum legal size of 28 cm, which is the same limit as Victoria.

.

=== Yellowfin seabream ===
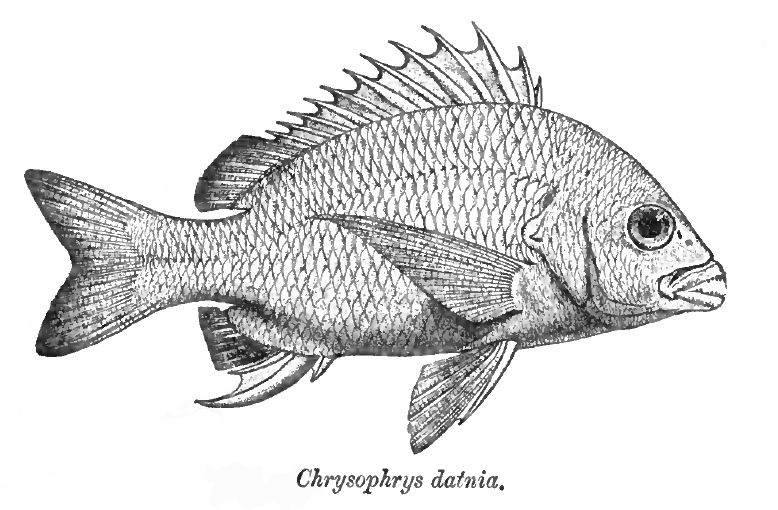
Yellowfin seabream

Yellowfin seabream (Acanthopagrus latus) are found along in shallow coastal waters from the Persian Gulf to the coast of India to the Philippines, and north to Japan, south to Australia. Eats mollusks, crustaceans, echinoderms and worms. Is a popular angling fish.

=== Australasian snapper ===
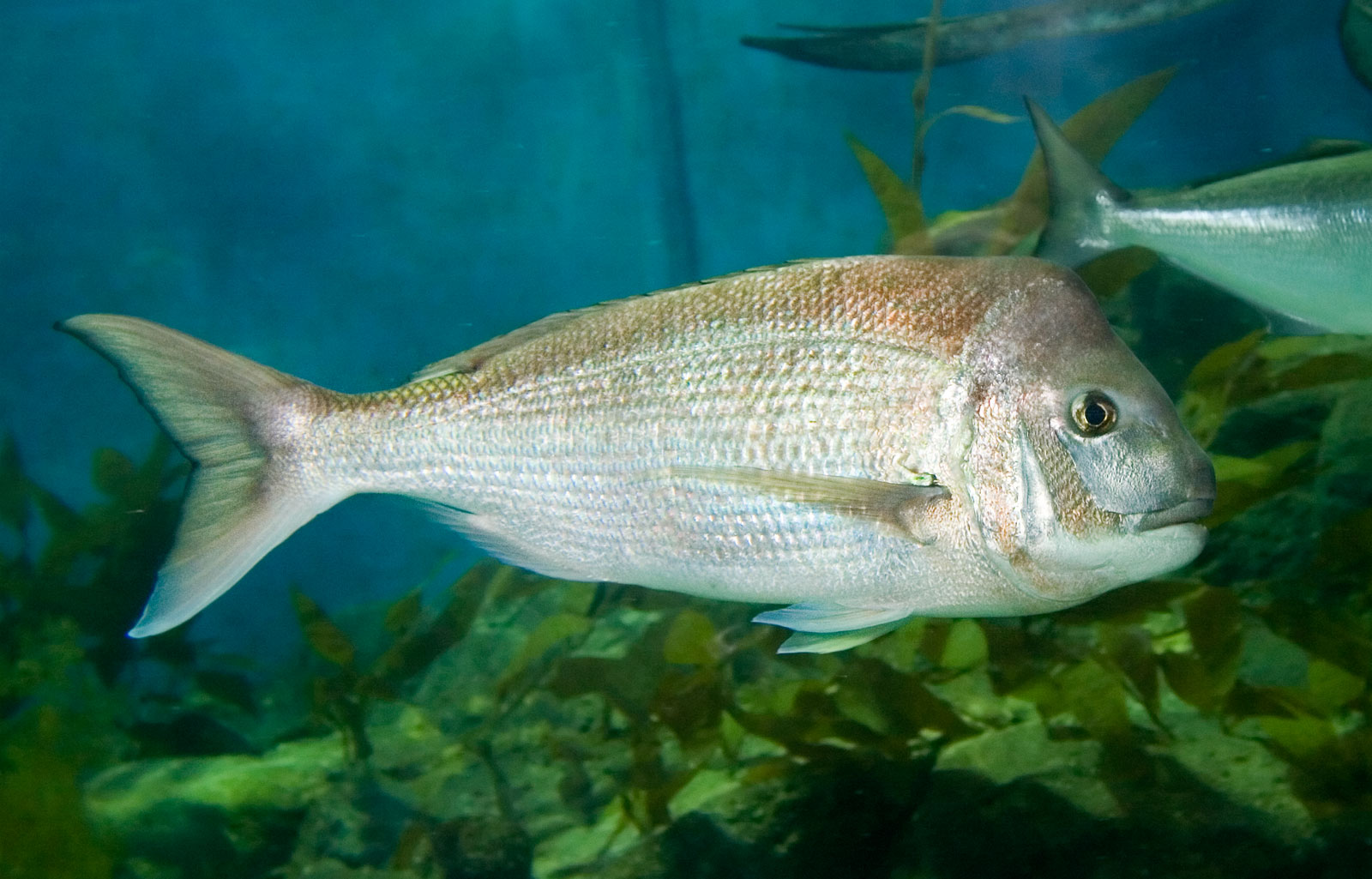
Australasian snapper

The Australasian snapper or squirefish is a species of porgie widely found in coastal waters of New Zealand and southern Australia. Although it is almost universally known in these countries as snapper it does not belong to the family Lutjanidae. It is highly prized as an eating fish.

The fish is found on all coasts of New Zealand, especially in the north. In Australia it is found along the south coast and as far north as Coral Bay in the west, and Cape Manifold in Queensland in the east. It is also found on the coast of Tasmania but in lesser numbers. The fish spawn in inshore waters and live in rocky areas and reefs of up to 200 m deep. They school, and will migrate between reefs. Larger fish are known to enter estuaries and harbours, for example Port Phillip Bay has a renowned seasonal snapper run.

Growth rates are quite slow, a 10 kg adult is probably 20 years old, and a fish at the maximum size of 1.3 m long and 20 kg is probably 50 years old. Sexual maturity is reached at about 30 cm long and a small percentage of the males will turn into females at puberty. Anglers are advised not to take immature fish, so as not to reduce breeding stock.

They are a popular recreational fish. The current IGFA all tackle record is 17.20 kilograms (38 lb), caught in 1992 near Mottiti Island, New Zealand. The legal size in Australia varies by state, from 35 cm and a bag limit of 5 fish per person in Queensland to 41 cm in Western Australia. Minimum sizes are supposed to be designed to allow these fish to participate in spawning runs at least once before they become available to the fishery, however given the slow growth rates of this species, there is need to consider area closures and/or further increasing the minimum sizes in each state to reduce the chances of growth overfishing of the various populations of snapper throughout its range. This may be important with recent developments in technology such as GPS.

=== Other ===
- Pagrus major, the red porgy, also called red sea bream (not to be confused with Pagellus bogaraveo, the blackspot seabream) –
- Sheepshead porgy –
- Lagodon rhomboides, the pinfish – inhabit mostly subtropical shallow coastal waters of the Atlantic and Gulf coasts of the United States and Mexico. It is a small fish, growing only to about 4.5 in (11.4 cm). Pinfish rarely school, but can be found near each other, especially along structure which supports barnacles and mollusks. They eat shrimp, fish eggs, insect larvae, polychaete worms and amphipods, and plant matter. Pinfish are not generally sought as sport or food in the United States due to their small size and numerous small bones. They are used as live bait by anglers targeting red drum, speckled sea trout and flounder. They may be caught on small hooks along piers and jetties, but often are considered a nuisance bait stealer.
