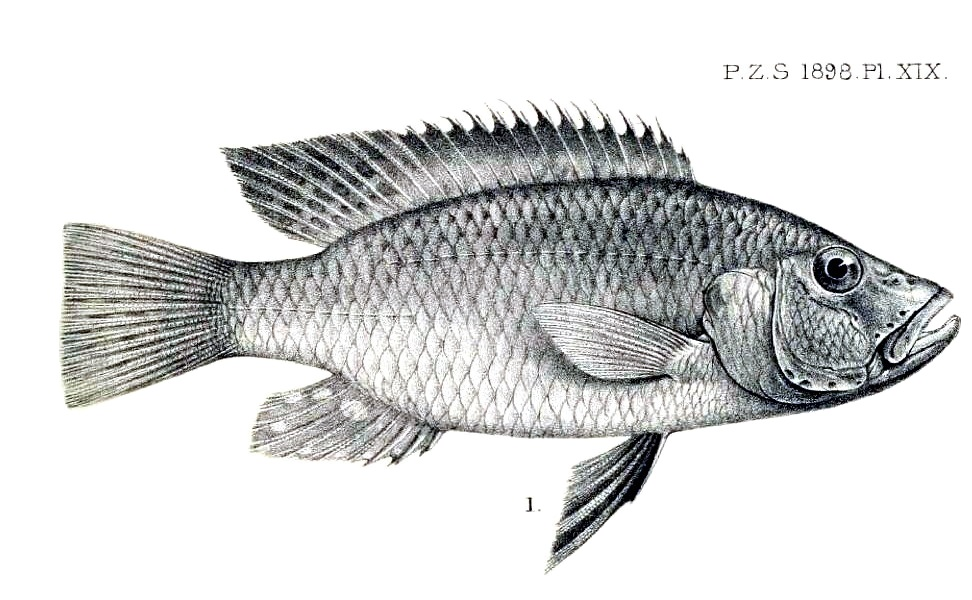
- Chetia welwitschi

Scientific classification
- Kingdom: Animalia
- Phylum: Chordata
- Class: Actinopterygii
- Order: Cichliformes
- Family: Cichlidae
- Tribe: Haplochromini
- Genus: Chetia; Trewavas, 1961

Type species
- Chetia flaviventris Trewavas, 1961

= Chetia =

Genus of fishes

Chetia is a genus of haplochromine cichlids endemic to riverine habitats in southern Africa, as well as the Congo River Basin.

== Species ==
There are currently six recognized species in this genus:

- Chetia brevicauda I. R. Bills & Olaf, 2002
- Chetia brevis R. A. Jubb, 1968 (orange-fringed largemouth)
- Chetia flaviventris Trewavas, 1961 (canary kurper)
- Chetia gracilis (Greenwood, 1984) (slender happy)
- Chetia mola Balon & D. J. Stewart, 1983
- Chetia welwitschi (Boulenger, 1898) (Angolan happy)
