= S. nigricauda =

S. nigricauda may refer to:

- Sipia nigricauda, the stub-tailed antbird, a bird species
- Spicara nigricauda, Norman, 1931, the blacktail picarel, a fish species in the genus Spicara and the family Centracanthidae
- Stenaelurillus nigricauda, a jumping spider species in the genus Stenaelurillus

== See also ==
- Nigricauda (disambiguation)
