= Rineloricaria steindachneri =

Conservation status
- Least Concern (IUCN 3.1)

Scientific classification
- Kingdom: Animalia
- Phylum: Chordata
- Class: Actinopterygii
- Order: Siluriformes
- Family: Loricariidae
- Genus: Rineloricaria
- Species: R. steindachneri

Binomial name
- Rineloricaria steindachneri (Regan, 1904)

Synonyms
- Loricaria steindachneri Regan, 1904

Species of catfish

Rineloricaria steindachneri is a species of freshwater ray-finned fish belonging to the family Loricariidae, the suckermouth armored catfishes, and the subfamily Loricariinae, the mailed catfishes.. This catfish is endemic to the lower Paraíba do Sul in the states of Minas Gerais and Rio de Janeiro in southeastern Brazil. The species reaches a standard length of 19 cm (7.5 in) and is believed to be a facultative air-breather. The specific name honors the Austrian ichthyologist Franz Steindachner, who was the first to repport this fish, albeit under the name R. lima.
