= Rineloricaria reisi =

Conservation status
- Least Concern (IUCN 3.1)

Scientific classification
- Kingdom: Animalia
- Phylum: Chordata
- Class: Actinopterygii
- Order: Siluriformes
- Family: Loricariidae
- Genus: Rineloricaria
- Species: R. reisi

Binomial name
- Rineloricaria reisi Ghazzi, 2008

Species of catfish

Rineloricaria reisi is a species of freshwater ray-finned fish belonging to the family Loricariidae, the suckermouth armored catfishes, and the subfamily Loricariinae, the mailed catfishes. This catfish occurs in the Uruguay River basin, specifically the Piratini River and the Conceição River in the southern Brazilian state of Rio Grande do Sul, as well as Misiones Province in Argentina. This species reaches a standard length of 19 cm (7.5 in) and is believed to be a facultative air-breather. The Specific name honors the Brazilian ichthyologist Roberto Esser dos Reis, recognising his contribution to the study of Neotropical fishes, in particular the mailed catfishes.
