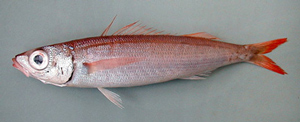

Conservation status
- Least Concern (IUCN 3.1)

Scientific classification
- Kingdom: Animalia
- Phylum: Chordata
- Class: Actinopterygii
- Order: Acanthuriformes
- Family: Sparidae
- Genus: Centracanthus; Rafinesque, 1810
- Species: C. cirrus

Binomial name
- Centracanthus cirrus Rafinesque, 1810

Synonyms
- Smaris royerii Bowdich, 1825; Smaris insidiator Valenciennes, 1830; Smaris angustatus Valenciennes, 1830

= Centracanthus cirrus =

Species of fish

Centracanthus cirrus, the curled picarel, is a species of marine ray-finned fish belonging to the family Sparidae, the seabreams and porgies. This fish is found in the temperate Eastern Atlantic Ocean and the Mediterranean and Black Seas. It is the only extant species in the genus Centracanthus. This species is of minor importance to commercial fisheries.

== Taxonomy ==
Centracanthus cirrus was first formally described in 1810 by the French naturalist and polymath Constantine Samuel Rafinesque with its type locality given as Sicily. It is the type species, and only extant species, in the genus Centracanthus which Rafinesque proposed when he described this species. Centracanthus is placed in the family Sparidae within the order Spariformes by the 5th edition of Fishes of the World. Some authorities classify this genus in the monotypic subfamily Centracanthinae, but the 5th edition of Fishes of the World does not recognise subfamilies within the Sparidae. Centracanthus, along with Spicara, was considered to belong to a separate family, Centracanthidae, but phylogenetic analyses resolved that the Sparidae was paraphyletic if Centracanthus and Spicara were not included within it.

== Etymology ==
Centracanthus cirrus has the specific name cirrus, this is a latinisation of the local name for this species in Sicily, cirrú.

== Description ==
Centracanthus cirrus has a strongly protrusible mouth and elongate body which is shallower than the length of the head and with a standard length which is 5 to 5.6 times its depth. There is a wide incision in the middle of the dorsal fin. The dorsal fin is supported by 13 spines and 9 or 10 soft rays while the anal fin contains 3 spines and 9 or 10 soft rays. The pectoral fins are longer than the pelvic fins. They are reddish on the upper body and whitish on the lower body. The curled picarel has a maximum published total length of 34 cm (13 in), although 12 cm (4.7 in) is more common.

== Distribution and habitat ==
Centracanthus cirrus is found in the temperate western Atlantic Ocean as far north as Portugal and south to the Canary Islands, into the Mediterranean Sea and the Black Sea. C. cirrus has also been reported from Cape Verde and Mauritania. The curled picarel is a coastal species found over substrates of rock or gravel down to 200 m (660 ft), although it has been recorded as deep as 464 m (1,522 ft) in the Ionian Sea. The deepest it has been found at is 1,000 metres (3,300 ft) in the Sea of Marmara.

== Biology ==
Centracanthus cirrus us a schooling fish, the schools move coastwards in spring and summer to spawn. It feeds on zooplankton and small fishes.

== Fisheries ==
Centracanthus cirrus is regarded as a commercially important species, but it is moderately abundant in some areas. Fishers use trammel nets and bottom trawls to catch this species and is the fish landed are most likely sold fresh or preserved by drying and salting, however, the flesh of the curled picarel is not held in high regards and much of the catch is processed to fishmeal and oil. To mark World Food Day in 2020, the World Wide Fund for Nature, in partnership with the co-management of Porto Cesareo, a fishing harbour in Apulia, arranged a tasting day using curled picarel in 5 dishes made by a local food processing business. This proved to be successful and the business now buys the fish landed as an ingredient in some of its products.
