= T. nigricauda =

T. nigricauda may refer to:

- Tatera nigricauda, the black-tailed gerbil, a rodent species
- Thallomys nigricauda, the black-tailed tree rat, a rodent species southwestern Africa
- Thrypticus nigricauda, Wood, 1913, a fly species in the genus Thrypticus

== See also ==
- Nigricauda (disambiguation)
