= C. nigricauda =

C. nigricauda may refer to:

- Cladura nigricauda, Alexander, 1954, a crane fly species in the genus Cladura
- Cyclops nigricauda, Norman, 1869, a copepod species in the genus Cyclops

== See also ==
- Nigricauda (disambiguation)
