= Rineloricaria setepovos =

Conservation status
- Least Concern (IUCN 3.1)

Scientific classification
- Kingdom: Animalia
- Phylum: Chordata
- Class: Actinopterygii
- Order: Siluriformes
- Family: Loricariidae
- Genus: Rineloricaria
- Species: R. setepovos

Binomial name
- Rineloricaria setepovos Ghazzi, 2008

Species of catfish

Rineloricaria setepovos is a species of freshwater ray-finned fish belonging to the family Loricariidae, the suckermouth armored catfishes, and the subfamily Loricariinae, the mailed catfishes.. This catfish occurs in the Piratini River, which is part of the Uruguay River basin, in the state of Rio Grande do Sul in southern Brazil. The species reaches a standard lengthof 10.6 cm (4.2 in) and is believed to be a facultative air-breather.
