= Rineloricaria stellata =

Conservation status
- Least Concern (IUCN 3.1)

Scientific classification
- Kingdom: Animalia
- Phylum: Chordata
- Class: Actinopterygii
- Order: Siluriformes
- Family: Loricariidae
- Genus: Rineloricaria
- Species: R. stellata

Binomial name
- Rineloricaria stellata Ghazzi, 2008

Species of catfish

Rineloricaria stellata is a species of freshwater ray-finned fish belonging to the family Loricariidae, the suckermouth armored catfishes, and the subfamily Loricariinae, the mailed catfishes. This catfish occurs in the Uruguay River basin in the southern Brazilian state of Rio Grande do Sul, including the Buricá River, the Ibicuí River, the Ijuí River, and the Piratini River. It has also been found to occur in Misiones Province in Argentina. This species reaches a standard length of 11 cm (4.3 in) and is believed to be a facultative air-breather.
