= Rineloricaria jurupari =

Conservation status
- Endangered (IUCN 3.1)

Scientific classification
- Kingdom: Animalia
- Phylum: Chordata
- Class: Actinopterygii
- Order: Siluriformes
- Family: Loricariidae
- Genus: Rineloricaria
- Species: R. jurupari

Binomial name
- Rineloricaria jurupari Londoño-Burbano & Urbano-Bonilla, 2018

Species of catfish

Rineloricaria jurupari is a species of freshwater ray-finned fish is a species of freshwater ray-finned fish belonging to the family Loricariidae, the suckermouth armored catfishes, and the subfamily Loricariinae, the mailed catfishes. This catfish is endemic to Colombia where it is known from six separate locations in the Caño La Tigra stream in the Unilla River drainage, and in the Itilla River tributaries to the upper Vaupés River, which drains into the Amazon River. This species is believed to be a facultative air-breather.
