= Rineloricaria altipinnis =

Conservation status
- Vulnerable (IUCN 3.1)

Scientific classification
- Kingdom: Animalia
- Phylum: Chordata
- Class: Actinopterygii
- Order: Siluriformes
- Family: Loricariidae
- Genus: Rineloricaria
- Species: R. altipinnis

Binomial name
- Rineloricaria altipinnis (Breder, 1925)

Synonyms
- Loricaria altipinnis Breder, 1925; Hemiloricaria altipinnis (Breder 1925)

Species of catfish

Rineloricaria altipinnis is a species of freshwater ray-finned fish belonging to the family Loricariidae, the suckermouth armored catfishes, and the subfamily Loricariinae, the mailed catfishes. This catfish is only known from 5 locations in Eastern Panama, the type locality in the Chico River, part of the Tuira River system in Darien. it has also been recorded in the Chamurucuate stream, Bayano River and Sambú River.This species attains a standard length of 15.4 cm (6.1 in) and is thought to be a facultative air breather.
