= Rineloricaria kronei =

Conservation status
- Data Deficient (IUCN 3.1)

Scientific classification
- Kingdom: Animalia
- Phylum: Chordata
- Class: Actinopterygii
- Order: Siluriformes
- Family: Loricariidae
- Genus: Rineloricaria
- Species: R. kronei

Binomial name
- Rineloricaria kronei (A. Miranda-Ribeiro, 1911)

Synonyms
- Loricaria kronei A. Miranda-Ribeiro, 1911

Species of catfish

Rineloricaria kronei is a species of freshwater ray-finned fish is a species of freshwater ray-finned fish belonging to the family Loricariidae, the suckermouth armored catfishes, and the subfamily Loricariinae, the mailed catfishes. This catfish occurs in the Ribeira de Iguape River basin in the Brazilian states of Sao Paulo and Parańa. This species is believed to be a facultative air-breather. The specific name honors the German-born Brazilian pharmacist and naturalist Sigismund Ernst Richard (Ricardo) Krone, the discoverer of this species.
