= Rineloricaria formosa =

Conservation status
- Least Concern (IUCN 3.1)

Scientific classification
- Kingdom: Animalia
- Phylum: Chordata
- Class: Actinopterygii
- Order: Siluriformes
- Family: Loricariidae
- Genus: Rineloricaria
- Species: R. formosa

Binomial name
- Rineloricaria formosa Isbrücker & Nijssen, 1979

Synonyms
- Hemiloricaria formosa (Isbrücker & Nijssen 1979)

Species of catfish

Rineloricaria formosa is a species of freshwater ray-finned fish belonging to the family Loricariidae, the suckermouth armored catfishes, and the subfamily Loricariinae, the mailed catfishes. This catfish is found in the western Orinoco and upper Amazon River basins in Brazil, Colombia, Guyana and Venezuela. This species reaches a standard length of 15.2 cm (6.0 in) and is believed to be a facultative air-breather.
