= Rineloricaria aequalicuspis =

Conservation status
- Least Concern (IUCN 3.1)

Scientific classification
- Kingdom: Animalia
- Phylum: Chordata
- Class: Actinopterygii
- Order: Siluriformes
- Family: Loricariidae
- Genus: Rineloricaria
- Species: R. aequalicuspis

Binomial name
- Rineloricaria aequalicuspis Reis & A. R. Cardoso, 2001

Species of catfish

Rineloricaria aequalicuspis is a species of freshwater ray-finned fish belonging to the family Loricariidae, the suckermouth armored catfishes, and the subfamily Loricariinae, the mailed catfishes. This catfish is endemic to Brazil where it is found in the states of Rio Grande do Sul and Santa Catarina. It is typically found in creeks and rivers of a variety of widths, where it occurs at various depths over substrates composed of rocks and stones. The species reaches a standard length of 16.1 cm (6.3 in) and is believed to be a facultative air-breather. The specific name, aequalicuspis, is a combination of the Latin words aequalis, which means "equal", and cuspis, meaning a "point" or "pointed end", an allusion to the shape of the teeth which have two cusps of almost equal size.
