= Rineloricaria stewarti =

Conservation status
- Least Concern (IUCN 3.1)

Scientific classification
- Kingdom: Animalia
- Phylum: Chordata
- Class: Actinopterygii
- Order: Siluriformes
- Family: Loricariidae
- Genus: Rineloricaria
- Species: R. stewarti

Binomial name
- Rineloricaria stewarti (C. H. Eigenmann, 1909)

Synonyms
- Loricaria stewarti C. H. Eigenmann, 1909; Hemiloricaria stewarti (C. H. Eigenmann, 1909)

Species of catfish

Rineloricaria stewarti, sometimes known as Stewart's whiptail catfish, is a species of freshwater ray-finned fish belonging to the family Loricariidae, the suckermouth armored catfishes, and the subfamily Loricariinae, the mailed catfishes. This catfish occurs in the coastal rivers of the Guianas, being known from French Guiana, Guyana and Suriname, as well as adjacent parts of Venezuela and Brazil. It is typically seen in moderately sunlit forest creeks with a depth of 30 to 60 cm (12 to 24 in), clear, fast-moving water, and a substrate composed of rocks and sand. It is known to occur alongside the species Corydoras guianensis and Moenkhausia oligolepis, as well as members of the genus Phenacogaster. The specific name honors Douglas Stewart of the Carnegie Museum of Natural History.

Mature male individuals of Rineloricaria stewarti are known to develop odontodes on both sides of the head and towards the back of the interorbitals. The species reaches a standard length of 10 cm (3.9 in) and is believed to be a facultative air-breather.
