= Rineloricaria caracasensis =

Scientific classification
- Kingdom: Animalia
- Phylum: Chordata
- Class: Actinopterygii
- Order: Siluriformes
- Family: Loricariidae
- Genus: Rineloricaria
- Species: R. caracasensis

Binomial name
- Rineloricaria caracasensis (Bleeker, 1862)

Synonyms
- Hemiloricaria caracasensis Bleeker, 1862

Species of catfish

Rineloricaria caracasensis is a species of freshwater ray-finned fish belonging to the family Loricariidae, the suckermouth armored catfishes, and the subfamily Loricariinae, the mailed catfishes. This catfish is found in the Caribbean coastal drainages of Venezuela. The species is known to be a facultative air-breather.
