= Rineloricaria magdalenae =

Conservation status
- Least Concern (IUCN 3.1)

Scientific classification
- Kingdom: Animalia
- Phylum: Chordata
- Class: Actinopterygii
- Division: Teleostei
- Order: Siluriformes
- Family: Loricariidae
- Genus: Rineloricaria
- Species: R. magdalenae

Binomial name
- Rineloricaria magdalenae (Steindachner, 1879)

Synonyms
- Loricaria magdalenae Steindachner, 1879; Hemiloricaria magdalenae (Steindachner, 1879)

Species of catfish

Rineloricaria magdalenaeis a species of freshwater ray-finned fish belonging to the family Loricariidae, the suckermouth armored catfishes, and the subfamily Loricariinae, the mailed catfishes. This catfish occurs in the Magdalena-Cauca drainage basin in Colombia, it may also occur in the Lake Maracaibo drainage system in Colombia and Venezuela but this needs confirmation. It is typically found in slow-flowing rivers, as well as marshes and swamps. The species reaches 20 cm (7.9 in) in length and is believed to be a facultative air-breather.
