= Rineloricaria konopickyi =

Conservation status
- Data Deficient (IUCN 3.1)

Scientific classification
- Kingdom: Animalia
- Phylum: Chordata
- Class: Actinopterygii
- Order: Siluriformes
- Family: Loricariidae
- Genus: Rineloricaria
- Species: R. konopickyi

Binomial name
- Rineloricaria konopickyi (Steindachner, 1879)

Synonyms
- Loricaria konopickyi Steindachner, 1879; Hemiloricaria konopickyi (Steindachner 1879)

Species of catfish

Rineloricaria konopickyi is a species of freshwater ray-finned fish is a species of freshwater ray-finned fish belonging to the family Loricariidae, the suckermouth armored catfishes, and the subfamily Loricariinae, the mailed catfishes. This catfish is known only from its holotype, the type locality being given as the rather vague "middle Amazon River" in the Brazilian state of Amazonas. The holotype had a standard length of 9.6 cm (3.8 in), species in this genus are thought to be facultative air breathers. The specific name honors Eduard Konopicky, who illustrated Steindachner's work, and who, in 1905, was described by David Starr Jordan as “the best illustrations of fishes made by any artist”.
