= Rineloricaria pentamaculata =

Conservation status
- Least Concern (IUCN 3.1)

Scientific classification
- Kingdom: Animalia
- Phylum: Chordata
- Class: Actinopterygii
- Division: Teleostei
- Order: Siluriformes
- Family: Loricariidae
- Genus: Rineloricaria
- Species: R. pentamaculata

Binomial name
- Rineloricaria pentamaculata Langeani & R. B. de Araujo, 1994

Species of catfish

Rineloricaria pentamaculata is a species of freshwater ray-finned fish belonging to the family Loricariidae, the suckermouth armored catfishes, and the subfamily Loricariinae, the mailed catfishes. This catfish occurs in the upper basin of the Paraná River in the Brazilian states of Goiás, Paraná, São Paulo, Mato Grosso do Sul and Minas Gerais. The species is believed to be a facultative air-breather.
