= Rineloricaria pareiacantha =

Scientific classification
- Kingdom: Animalia
- Phylum: Chordata
- Class: Actinopterygii
- Order: Siluriformes
- Family: Loricariidae
- Genus: Rineloricaria
- Species: R. pareiacantha

Binomial name
- Rineloricaria pareiacantha (Fowler, 1943)

Synonyms
- Loricaria pareiacantha Fowler, 1943

Species of catfish

Rineloricaria pareiacantha is a species of freshwater ray-finned fish belonging to the family Loricariidae, the suckermouth armored catfishes, and the subfamily Loricariinae, the mailed catfishes. This catfish occurs in the Santa Lucía River basin in Uruguay. This species reaches 10 cm (3.9 in) in length and is believed to be a facultative air-breather.
