= Rineloricaria thrissoceps =

Conservation status
- Least Concern (IUCN 3.1)

Scientific classification
- Kingdom: Animalia
- Phylum: Chordata
- Class: Actinopterygii
- Order: Siluriformes
- Family: Loricariidae
- Genus: Rineloricaria
- Species: R. thrissoceps

Binomial name
- Rineloricaria thrissoceps (Fowler, 1943)

Synonyms
- Loricaria thrissoceps Fowler, 1943

Species of catfish

Rineloricaria thrissocepsis a species of freshwater ray-finned fish belonging to the family Loricariidae, the suckermouth armored catfishes, and the subfamily Loricariinae, the mailed catfishes.. This catfish is only known from the type series which was collected in the Santa Lucía River in Canelones Department, Uruguay in 1934 by the Uruguayan biologist Florentino Felippone. This species reaches 10.6 cm (4.2 in) in length and is believed to be a facultative air-breather.
