= Rineloricaria cacerensis =

Conservation status
- Least Concern (IUCN 3.1)

Scientific classification
- Kingdom: Animalia
- Phylum: Chordata
- Class: Actinopterygii
- Order: Siluriformes
- Family: Loricariidae
- Genus: Rineloricaria
- Species: R. cacerensis

Binomial name
- Rineloricaria cacerensis (A. Miranda-Ribeiro, 1912)

Synonyms
- Loricaria cacerensis A. Miranda-Ribeiro, 1912; Hemiloricaria cacerensis (A. Miranda-Ribeiro, 1912)

Species of catfish

Rineloricaria cacerensis is a species of freshwater ray-finned fish belonging to the family Loricariidae, the suckermouth armored catfishes, and the subfamily Loricariinae, the mailed catfishes. This catfish is found in the Paraguay River basin in Brazil, with its type locality reportedly being Cáceres in the state of Mato Grosso. The species is believed to be a facultative air-breather, like other members of the genus Rineloricaria.
