= Rineloricaria morrowi =

Conservation status
- Least Concern (IUCN 3.1)

Scientific classification
- Kingdom: Animalia
- Phylum: Chordata
- Class: Actinopterygii
- Order: Siluriformes
- Family: Loricariidae
- Genus: Rineloricaria
- Species: R. morrowi

Binomial name
- Rineloricaria morrowi Fowler, 1940

Synonyms
- Hemiloricaria morrowi (Fowler, 1940)

Species of catfish

Rineloricaria morrowi is a species of freshwater ray-finned fish belonging to the family Loricariidae, the suckermouth armored catfishes, and the subfamily Loricariinae, the mailed catfishes. This catfish occurs in the Ucayali, Inambari and Nanay River basins in Peru. The species reaches a standard length of 16.5 cm (6.5 in) and is believed to be a facultative air-breather. The specific name honors William C. Morrow, who led the expedition to Peru on which the holotype was collected.
