= Rineloricaria tropeira =

Conservation status
- Least Concern (IUCN 3.1)

Scientific classification
- Kingdom: Animalia
- Phylum: Chordata
- Class: Actinopterygii
- Order: Siluriformes
- Family: Loricariidae
- Genus: Rineloricaria
- Species: R. tropeira

Binomial name
- Rineloricaria tropeira Ghazzi, 2008

Species of catfish

Rineloricaria tropeira is a species of freshwater ray-finned fish belonging to the family Loricariidae, the suckermouth armored catfishes, and the subfamily Loricariinae, the mailed catfishes.. This catfish occurs in the drainages of the Canoas River and the Pelotas River, tributaries of the upper Uruguay River, in the southern Brazilian states of Rio Grande do Sul and Santa Catarina. The species reaches a standard length of 10.3 cm (4.1 in) and is believed to be a facultative air-breather.
