= Rineloricaria microlepidota =

Conservation status
- Data Deficient (IUCN 3.1)

Scientific classification
- Kingdom: Animalia
- Phylum: Chordata
- Class: Actinopterygii
- Order: Siluriformes
- Family: Loricariidae
- Genus: Rineloricaria
- Species: R. microlepidota

Binomial name
- Rineloricaria microlepidota (Steindachner, 1907)

Synonyms
- Loricaria lima microlepidota Steindachner, 1907

Species of catfish

Rineloricaria microlepidota is a species of freshwater ray-finned fish belonging to the family Loricariidae, the suckermouth armored catfishes, and the subfamily Loricariinae, the mailed catfishes. The only record of this catfish is from the type locality, in the Juruá River in Amazonas in Brazil. There is no information on its current conservation status or on possible threats. Therefore, the species has been categorized as Data Deficient. The species reaches 14.5 cm (5.7 in) in length and is believed to be a facultative air-breather.
