= Rineloricaria misionera =

Conservation status
- Vulnerable (IUCN 3.1)

Scientific classification
- Kingdom: Animalia
- Phylum: Chordata
- Class: Actinopterygii
- Division: Teleostei
- Order: Siluriformes
- Family: Loricariidae
- Genus: Rineloricaria
- Species: R. misionera

Binomial name
- Rineloricaria misionera M. S. Rodriguez & Miquelarena, 2008

Species of catfish

Rineloricaria misionera is a species of freshwater ray-finned fish belonging to the family Loricariidae, the suckermouth armored catfishes, and the subfamily Loricariinae, the mailed catfishes. This catfish occurs in the basins of the Paraná River and the Uruguay River in Misiones in Argentina. It is typically found in small streams with swift currents and substrates composed of rocks and sand. It is known to be nocturnal, seeking shelter between rocks during the day. The species reaches a standard length of 9.7 cm (3.8 in) and is believed to be a facultative air-breather. The specific name, misionera, is Spanish for "missionary" and is a reference to the Argentinian province of Misiones, where the type locality of Arroyo Cuña-Pirú is located.
