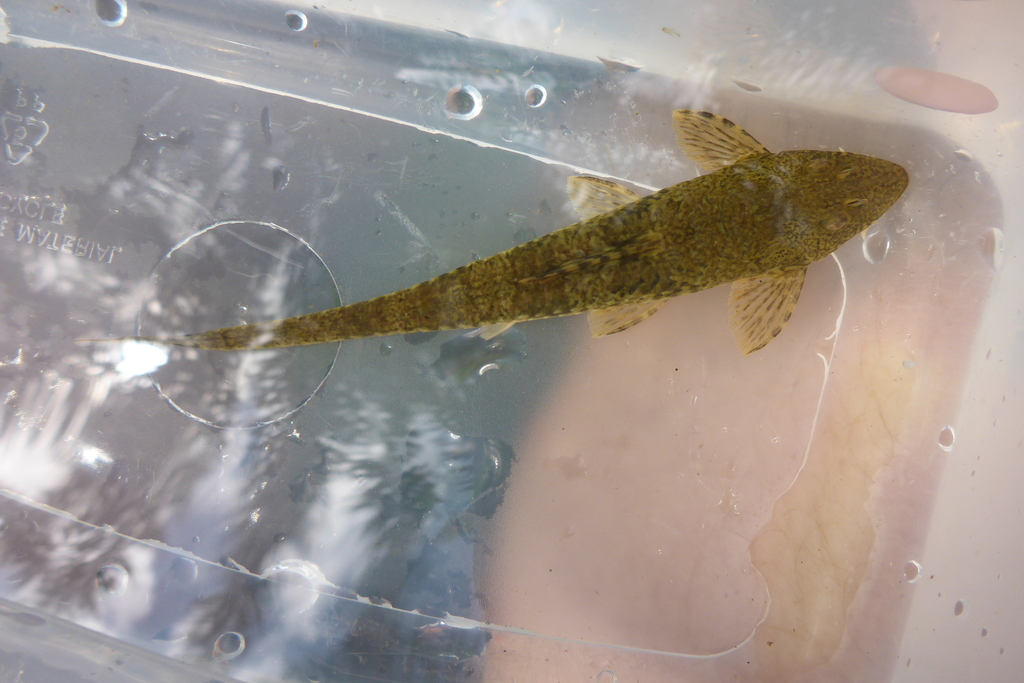

Conservation status
- Least Concern (IUCN 3.1)

Scientific classification
- Kingdom: Animalia
- Phylum: Chordata
- Class: Actinopterygii
- Order: Siluriformes
- Family: Loricariidae
- Genus: Rineloricaria
- Species: R. uracantha

Binomial name
- Rineloricaria uracantha (Kner, 1863)

Synonyms
- Loricaria uracantha Kner, 1863; Fonchiiichthys uracantha (Kner, 1863); Loricaria bransfordi Gill, 1877

= Rineloricaria uracantha =

Species of fish

Rineloricaria uracantha is a species of freshwater ray-finned fish belonging to the family Loricariidae, the suckermouth armored catfishes, and the subfamily Loricariinae, the mailed catfishes.. This catfish occurs in Costa Rica and Panama. It is sometimes a member of genus Fonchiiichthys which has recently been considered to be a synonym of Rineloricaria and thus may be invalid. This species grows to a standard length of 16.5 cm (6.5 in) and is a facultative air breather.
