= Rineloricaria anhaguapitan =

Conservation status
- Least Concern (IUCN 3.1)

Scientific classification
- Kingdom: Animalia
- Phylum: Chordata
- Class: Actinopterygii
- Order: Siluriformes
- Family: Loricariidae
- Genus: Rineloricaria
- Species: R. anhaguapitan

Binomial name
- Rineloricaria anhaguapitan Ghazzi, 2008

Species of catfish

Rineloricaria anhaguapitan is a species of freshwater ray-finned fish belonging to the family Loricariidae, the suckermouth armored catfishes, and the subfamily Loricariinae, the mailed catfishes. This catfish is endemic to Brazil where it occurs in the Passo Fundo River in the upper basin of the Uruguay River in Rio Grande do Sul. This species reaches a standard length of 12 cm (4.7 in) and is thought to be a facultative air breather. The specific name, anhaguapitan, which is sometime misspelled as anhanguapitan, is derived from a Tupi devil called Anhaguapitã, who fought St Peter who turned into small birds while the devil turned into stones and rain and formwed the Uruguay River.
