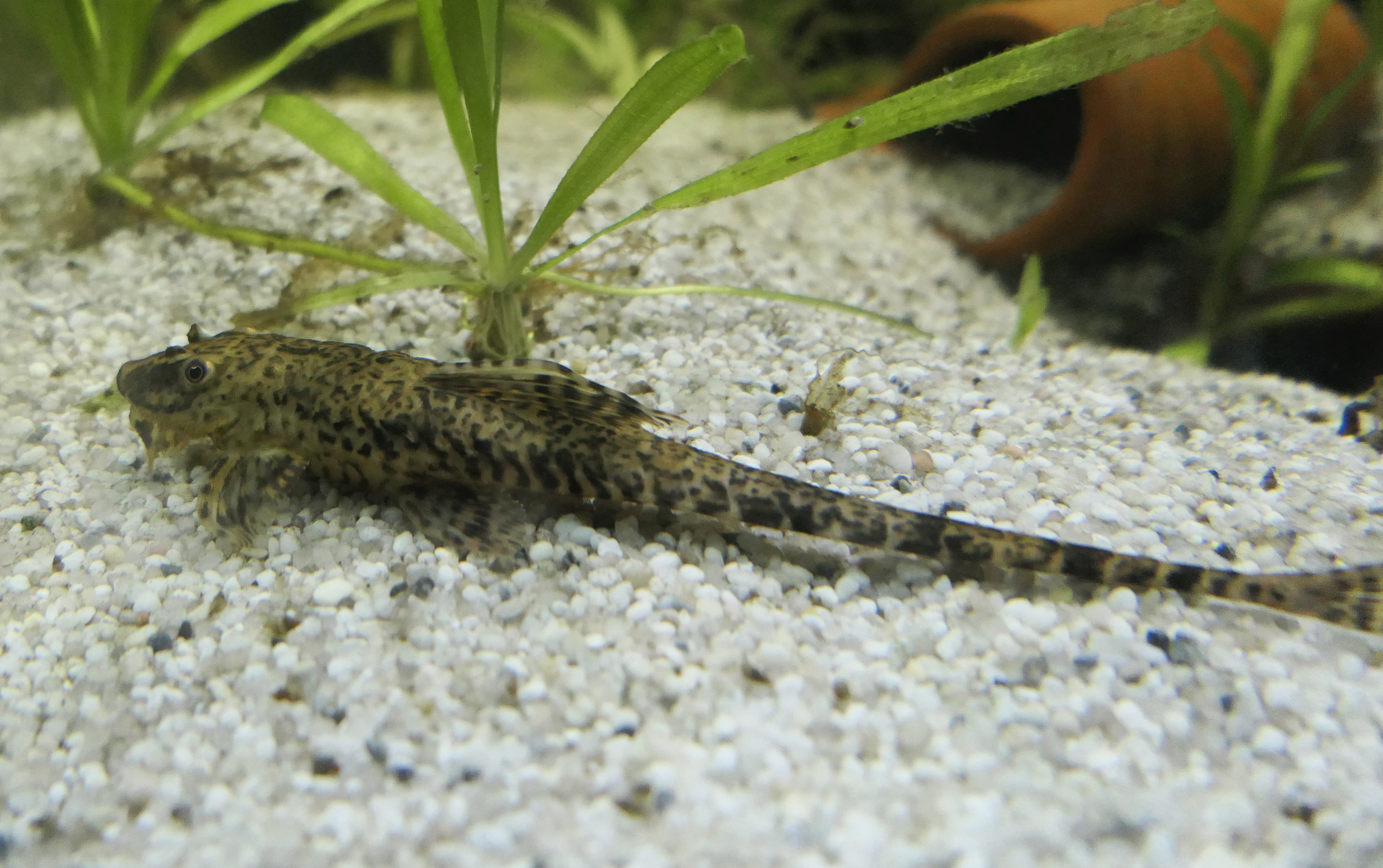

Conservation status
- Least Concern (IUCN 3.1)

Scientific classification
- Kingdom: Animalia
- Phylum: Chordata
- Class: Actinopterygii
- Order: Siluriformes
- Family: Loricariidae
- Genus: Rineloricaria
- Species: R. lanceolata

Binomial name
- Rineloricaria lanceolata (Günther, 1868)

Synonyms
- Loricaria lanceolata Günther, 1868; Hemiloricaria lanceolata (Günther, 1868); Loricaria hoehnei A. Miranda-Ribeiro, 1912; Hemiloricaria hoehnei (A. Miranda Ribeiro, 1912); Rineloricaria hoehnei (A. Miranda Ribeiro, 1912)

= Rineloricaria lanceolata =

Species of fish

Rineloricaria lanceolata, commonly known as the chocolate-colored catfish or the chocolate whiptail catfish, is a species of freshwater ray-finned fish is a species of freshwater ray-finned fish belonging to the family Loricariidae, the suckermouth armored catfishes, and the subfamily Loricariinae, the mailed catfishes. This catfish has a wide distribution in the Amazon, Orinoco, Tocantins-Araguaia and Paraguay river basins and has also been recorded in the lower reaches of the Paraná River. It has been recorded from Argentina, Bolivia, Brazil, Colombia, Ecuador, Guyana, Paraguay, Peru and Venezuela. It is reportedly typically found in sandy environments with leaf litter. It is omnivorous, feeding on periphyton and small invertebrates. This species reaches a total length of 12.3 cm (4.8 in) and is believed to be a facultative air-breather.

Rineloricaria lanceolata frequently appears in the aquarium trade, where it is considered a peaceful species that will accept a variety of food items, feeding on vegetable matter, dried foods, and small live or frozen invertebrates such as Daphnia or insect larvae. It will reportedly breed readily in captivity if the correct conditions are present.
