= Rineloricaria melini =

Conservation status
- Least Concern (IUCN 3.1)

Scientific classification
- Kingdom: Animalia
- Phylum: Chordata
- Class: Actinopterygii
- Order: Siluriformes
- Family: Loricariidae
- Genus: Rineloricaria
- Species: R. melini

Binomial name
- Rineloricaria melini (Schindler, 1959)

Synonyms
- Loricariichthys melini Schindler, 1959; Hemiloricaria melini (Schindler,1959)

Species of catfish

Rineloricaria melini is a species of freshwater ray-finned fish belonging to the family Loricariidae, the suckermouth armored catfishes, and the subfamily Loricariinae, the mailed catfishes. The IUCN state that the only record of this catfish is from its type locality, in the Solimões River, near Manacapuru, Amazonas state in Brazil, however, R. melini appears in the aquarium trade, where it is typically referred to as the dappled whiptail catfish. The holotype had a standard length of 13 cm (5.1 in) and is believed to be a facultative air-breather. The specific name honors the Swedish herpetologist Douglas Melin, the discoverer of this species.
