= Rineloricaria steinbachi =

Conservation status
- Least Concern (IUCN 3.1)

Scientific classification
- Kingdom: Animalia
- Phylum: Chordata
- Class: Actinopterygii
- Order: Siluriformes
- Family: Loricariidae
- Genus: Rineloricaria
- Species: R. steinbachi

Binomial name
- Rineloricaria steinbachi (Regan, 1906)

Synonyms
- Loricaria steinbachi Regan, 1906; Ixinandria steinbachi (Regan, 1906); Canthopomus montebelloi Fowler, 1940; Ixinandria montebelloi (Fowler, 1940)

Species of fish

Rineloricaria steinbachi is a species of freshwater ray-finned fish belonging to the family Loricariidae, the suckermouth armored catfishes, and the subfamily Loricariinae, the mailed catfishes. This species is sometimes in the monospecific genus Ixinandria. R. steinbachi is found in central South America in Argentina and Bolivia.

== Taxonomy ==
Ixinandria was part of the Rineloricaria group of the Loricariini tribe within the subfamily Loricariinae. The phylogenetic position of Ixinandria within the tribe Loricariini remains uncertain. It has been suggested that Ixinandria could be synonym of Rineloricaria.

Previously there were two species in this genus, but it was found that Ixinandria montebelloi was a synonym of R. steinbachi.

== Distribution ==
The distribution of this species includes rivers of the Atlantic slope of the Andes in Bolivia and Argentina. R. steinbachi occurs in the Salado River basin. R. steinbachi occurs in Salta Province in mountainous areas at high altitudes ranging from around 1,000–2,900 metres (3,300–9,500 ft) above sea level.

== Appearance and anatomy ==
Sexual dimorphism includes hypertrophied odontodes around the head margin and on the pectoral fin spines of mature males. These fish reach a length of 11.3 centimetres (4.4 in) SL.

== Habitat ecology ==
Rineloricaria steinbachi is a rheophilic species that lives in fast flowing and very oxygenated waters. Its color pattern reflects mimicry with stoned bottoms. Fertilized eggs have been found on the hidden surface of a stone, suggesting that R. steinbachi could be a cavity spawner.
