= Rineloricaria henselii =

Conservation status
- Data Deficient (IUCN 3.1)

Scientific classification
- Kingdom: Animalia
- Phylum: Chordata
- Class: Actinopterygii
- Order: Siluriformes
- Family: Loricariidae
- Genus: Rineloricaria
- Species: R. henselii

Binomial name
- Rineloricaria henselii (Steindachner, 1907)

Synonyms
- Loricaria henselii Steindachner, 1907

Species of catfish

Rineloricaria henselii is a species of freshwater ray-finned fish belonging to the family Loricariidae, the suckermouth armored catfishes, and the subfamily Loricariinae, the mailed catfishes. This catfish is known only from the holotype which was collected in the Cubatão River at Águas Mornas in southern Santa Catarina, Brazil. This species reaches a standard length of 7 cm (2.8 in) and is believed to be a facultative air-breather.

The specific name honors the German naturalist Reinhold Friedrich Hensel, who described releated species.
