= Rineloricaria fallax =

Conservation status
- Least Concern (IUCN 3.1)

Scientific classification
- Kingdom: Animalia
- Phylum: Chordata
- Class: Actinopterygii
- Order: Siluriformes
- Family: Loricariidae
- Genus: Rineloricaria
- Species: R. fallax

Binomial name
- Rineloricaria fallax (Steindachner, 1915)

Synonyms
- Loricaria (Loricariichthys) fallax Steindachner, 1915; Hemiloricaria fallax (Steindachner, 1915)

Species of catfish

Rineloricaria fallax is a species of freshwater ray-finned fish belonging to the family Loricariidae, the suckermouth armored catfishes, and the subfamily Loricariinae, the mailed catfishes. This catfish occurs in the upper Rupununi, Amazon and Orinoco river basins, having been recorded in Brazil, Colombia, Venezuela, Guyana and Suriname. Females lay their eggs in small caves and the eggs are tended by the male, who alo releases the fry from the eggs. This species reaches a standard length of 15.7 cm (6.2 in) and is thought to be a facultative air breather. This species is one of the commonest Rineloricaria species in the aquarium trade, the trade calling it the whiptail catfish.
