= Rineloricaria daraha =

Conservation status
- Least Concern (IUCN 3.1)

Scientific classification
- Kingdom: Animalia
- Phylum: Chordata
- Class: Actinopterygii
- Order: Siluriformes
- Family: Loricariidae
- Genus: Rineloricaria
- Species: R. daraha

Binomial name
- Rineloricaria daraha Rapp Py-Daniel & Fichberg, 2008

Species of catfish

Rineloricaria daraha is a species of freshwater ray-finned fish belonging to the family Loricariidae, the suckermouth armored catfishes, and the subfamily Loricariinae, the mailed catfishes. This catfish was originally known only from cataracts of the Daraá River in the state of Amazonas in Brazil. In 2016, the species was also found in the Paca River, a tributary of the Rio Negro, in Colombia, extending its known distribution. The species reaches a standard length of 20.1 cm (7.9 in) and is believed to be a facultative air-breather.
