= Rineloricaria castroi =

Conservation status
- Least Concern (IUCN 3.1)

Scientific classification
- Kingdom: Animalia
- Phylum: Chordata
- Class: Actinopterygii
- Order: Siluriformes
- Family: Loricariidae
- Genus: Rineloricaria
- Species: R. castroi

Binomial name
- Rineloricaria castroi Isbrücker & Nijssen, 1984

Synonyms
- Hemiloricaria castroi (Isbrücker & Nijssen, 1984)

Species of catfish

Rineloricaria castroi is a species of freshwater ray-finned fish belonging to the family Loricariidae, the suckermouth armored catfishes, and the subfamily Loricariinae, the mailed catfishes. This catfish occurs in the Amazon and Tocantins River basins in Colombia, Brazil, Peru, Bolivia, and Guyana. This species reaches a standard length of 16 cm (6.3 in) and is believed to be a facultative air-breather. The specific name honors the Brazilian ichthyologist Ricardo Macedo Corrêa e Castro of the University of São Paulo, the collector of the holotype.
