= Rineloricaria capitonia =

Conservation status
- Least Concern (IUCN 3.1)

Scientific classification
- Kingdom: Animalia
- Phylum: Chordata
- Class: Actinopterygii
- Order: Siluriformes
- Family: Loricariidae
- Genus: Rineloricaria
- Species: R. capitonia

Binomial name
- Rineloricaria capitonia Ghazzi, 2008

Species of catfish

Rineloricaria capitonia is a species of freshwater ray-finned fish belonging to the family Loricariidae, the suckermouth armored catfishes, and the subfamily Loricariinae, the mailed catfishes. This catfish occurs in the Alegre River and the Palmeira River, which are tributaries of the Ijuí River in the drainage basin of the Uruguay River, as well as the Passo Fundo River in Rio Grande do Sul and Santa Catarina. This species reaches a standard length of 19.2 cm (7.6 in) and is believed to be a facultative air-breather.
