= Rineloricaria baliola =

Conservation status
- Least Concern (IUCN 3.1)

Scientific classification
- Kingdom: Animalia
- Phylum: Chordata
- Class: Actinopterygii
- Order: Siluriformes
- Family: Loricariidae
- Genus: Rineloricaria
- Species: R. baliola

Binomial name
- Rineloricaria baliola Rodriguez & Reis, 2008

Species of catfish

Rineloricaria baliola is a species of freshwater ray-finned fish belonging to the family Loricariidae, the suckermouth armored catfishes, and the subfamily Loricariinae, the mailed catfishes. This catfish occurs in the drainage basins of the Jacuí River, the Taquari River, and the Lagoa dos Patos in Brazil, and it may also be found in Uruguay but this needfs confirmation. It is typically found in environments with flowing, clear or reddish water and a substrate composed of rocks, sand, or mud. This species reaches a standard length of 23.9 cm (9.4 in) and is believed to be a facultative air-breather. It can reportedly be distinguished from other members of the genus Rineloricaria by its unique coloration, with its specific name, baliola, being derived from Latin and referring to the reddish-brown color of the species.
