= Rineloricaria quadrensis =

Conservation status
- Least Concern (IUCN 3.1)

Scientific classification
- Kingdom: Animalia
- Phylum: Chordata
- Class: Actinopterygii
- Order: Siluriformes
- Family: Loricariidae
- Genus: Rineloricaria
- Species: R. quadrensis

Binomial name
- Rineloricaria quadrensis Reis, 1983

Species of catfish

Rineloricaria quadrensis is a species of freshwater ray-finned fish belonging to the family Loricariidae, the suckermouth armored catfishes, and the subfamily Loricariinae, the mailed catfishes. This catfish occurs in coastal streams and freshwater lagoons in the southern Brazilian states of Santa Catarina and Rio Grande do Sul. This species reaches a standard length of 14.7 cm (5.8 in) and is believed to be a facultative air-breather.
