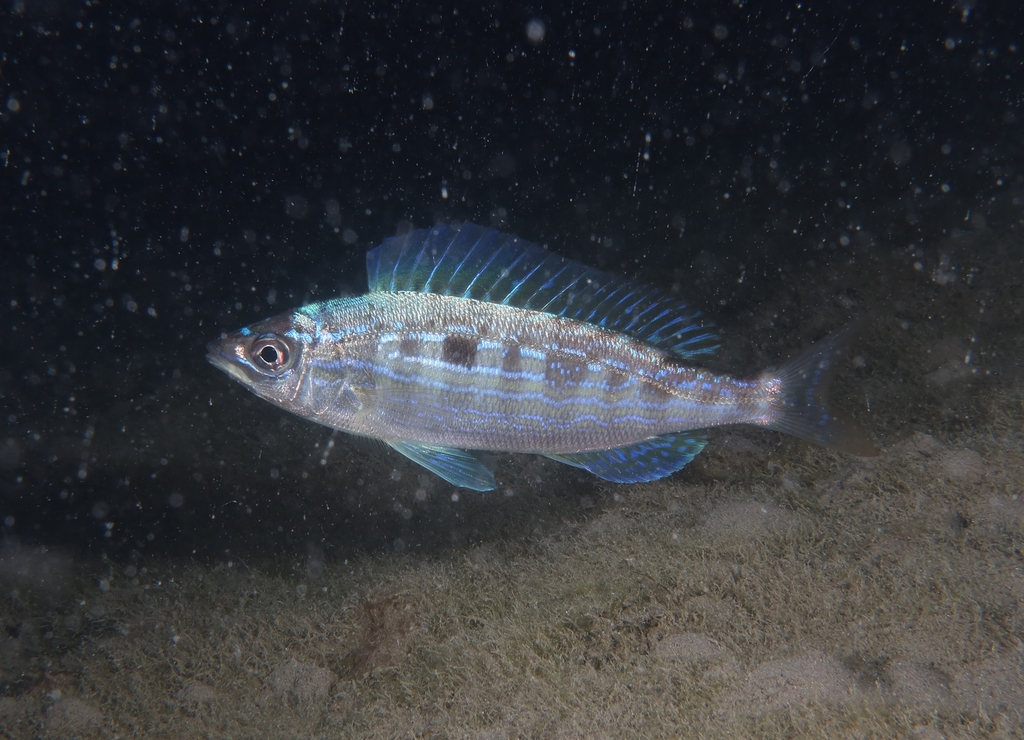

Scientific classification
- Kingdom: Animalia
- Phylum: Chordata
- Class: Actinopterygii
- Order: Acanthuriformes
- Family: Sparidae
- Genus: Spicara
- Species: S. flexuosum

Binomial name
- Spicara flexuosum Rafinesque, 1810

= Spicara flexuosum =

Species of fish

Spicara flexuosum, is a species of marine ray-finned fish belonging to the family Sparidae, the seabreams and porgies. This species is found in the Eastern Atlantic Ocean Ocean and the Mediterranean Sea and Black Sea.

== Taxonomy ==
Spicara flexuosum was first formally described in 1810 by the French polymath and naturalist Constantine Samuel Rafinesque with its type locality given as Sicily. When he described S. flexuosum Rafinesque classified it in the new monospecific genus Spicara, so this species is the type species of Spicara by monotypy. Some authorities have regarded S. flexuosa as a synonym of Spicara maena but both FishBase and Catalog of Fishes treat it as a valid species. The 5th edition of Fishes of the World classifies the genus Spicarain the family Sparidae within the order Spariformes by the 5th edition of Fishes of the World. Some authorities classify this genus in the subfamily Boopsinae, but the 5th edition of Fishes of the World does not recognise subfamilies within the Sparidae.

== Etymology ==
Spicara flexuosum has the genus name Spicara, which is a vernacular name for picarels, particularly S. flexuosa in Italy. This is presumed to derive from spica, “a spike”, or spicare, meaning “in the form of or furnished with a spike”, Rafinesque did not explain why he chose this name. The specific name, flexuosum, means "full of bends or curves", an allusion to the wavy yellow horizontal lines along the body of the breeding males.

== Description ==
Spicara flexuosum may be identified by the possession of a protrusible mouth; having 73 or less scales in the lateral line. The length of the head is equal to or greater than the depth of the body. The overall colour is yellowish or grey-brownish with a brownish spot at the axil of the pectoral fins. The colour is variable and changes with season, sex and age. This species has a maximum published total length of 23.2 cm (9.1 in), although 14 cm (5.5 in) is more typical, and a maximum published weight of 120 g (4.2 oz). This species is very similar to S. maena but was found to have distinct mitochondrial DNA from that species.

== Distribution and habitat ==
Spicara flexuosum is found in the eastern Atlantic Ocean, the Mediterranean and the Black Seas. It is a demersal fish found in schools at depths down to 130 m (430 ft) over sand and rubble areas of the seabed.
