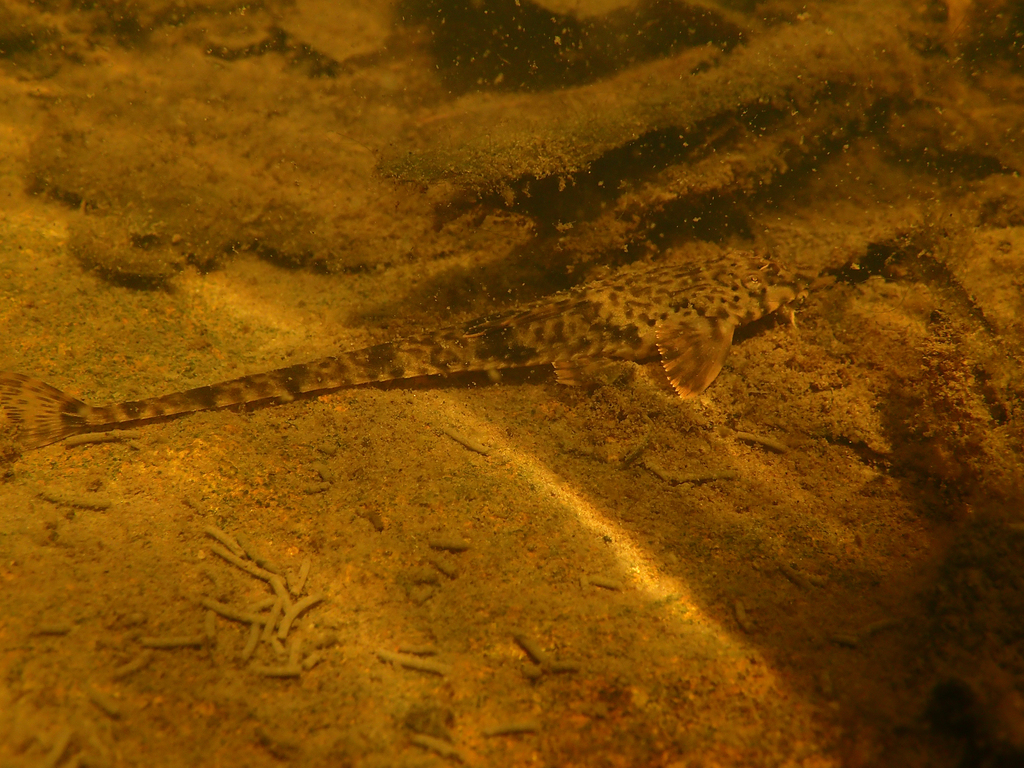

Conservation status
- Least Concern (IUCN 3.1)

Scientific classification
- Kingdom: Animalia
- Phylum: Chordata
- Class: Actinopterygii
- Order: Siluriformes
- Family: Loricariidae
- Genus: Rineloricaria
- Species: R. platyura

Binomial name
- Rineloricaria platyura (Müller & Troschel, 1849)

Synonyms
- Loricaria platyura Müller & Troschel, 1849; Hemiloricaria platyura (Müller & Troschel, 1849); Loricaria submarginatus C. H. Eigenmann, 1909

= Rineloricaria platyura =

Species of catfish

Rineloricaria platyura iis a species of freshwater ray-finned fish belonging to the family Loricariidae, the suckermouth armored catfishes, and the subfamily Loricariinae, the mailed catfishes. This catfish occurs in coastal rivers near the mouth of the Amazon to the Essequibo River, in Brazil and in the Guianas and in the Cuyuní River in Venezuela and Colombia. Records elsewhere, such as in the Amazon basin of Brazil may represent misidentifications. This species reaches a standard length of 14 cm (5.5 in) and is believed to be a facultative air-breather.

Rineloricaria platyura sometimes appears in the aquarium trade, where it is frequently referred to as the pearlscale whiptail or the Amazonia whiptail.
