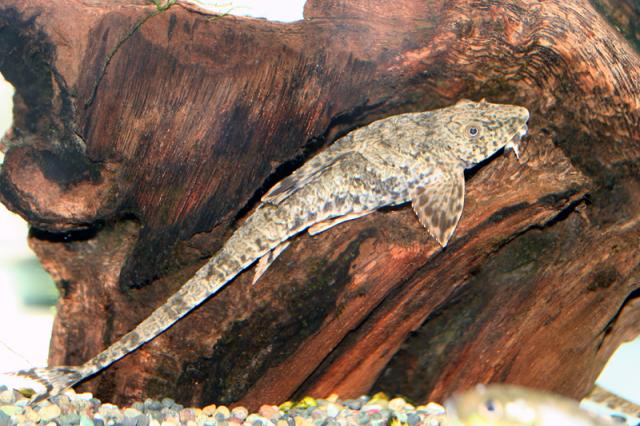

Conservation status
- Least Concern (IUCN 3.1)

Scientific classification
- Kingdom: Animalia
- Phylum: Chordata
- Class: Actinopterygii
- Order: Siluriformes
- Family: Loricariidae
- Genus: Rineloricaria
- Species: R. eigenmanni

Binomial name
- Rineloricaria eigenmanni (Pellegrin, 1908)

Synonyms
- Loricaria eigenmanni Pellegrin, 1908; Hemiloricaria eigenmanni (Pellegrin, 1908)

= Rineloricaria eigenmanni =

Species of catfish

Rineloricaria eigenmanni is a species of freshwater ray-finned fish belonging to the family Loricariidae, the suckermouth armored catfishes, and the subfamily Loricariinae, the mailed catfishes. This catfish occurs in the tributaries of the Orinoco River in the Andes and the Guiana Shield in Colombia and Venezuela. This species reaches a standard length of 10.2 cm (4.0 in) and is believed to be a facultative air-breather.

Rineloricaria eigenmanni appears in the aquarium trade, where it is sometimes known as the common whiptail catfish. The specific name honors the German-born American ichthyologist Carl H. Eigenmann, the describer, Jacques Pellegrin, saying that it was so named because "we owe the knowledge of so many interesting forms of American fishes" (on doit la connaissance de tant de formes intéressantes de Poissons américains) to Eigenmann.
