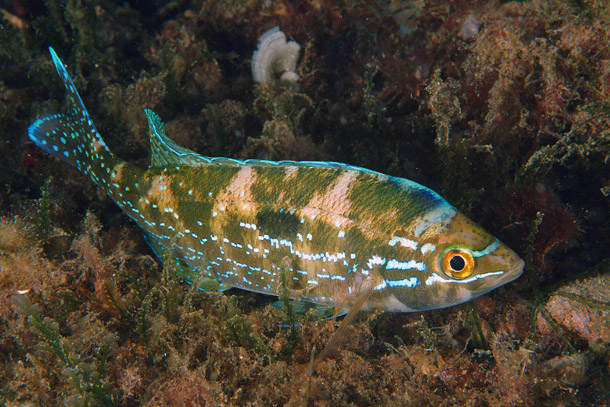
- Blotched picarel male spawning

Conservation status
- Least Concern (IUCN 3.1)

Scientific classification
- Kingdom: Animalia
- Phylum: Chordata
- Class: Actinopterygii
- Division: Teleostei
- Order: Acanthuriformes
- Family: Sparidae
- Genus: Spicara
- Species: S. maena

Binomial name
- Spicara maena (Linnaeus, 1758)

Synonyms
- Maena chryselis (Valenciennes, 1830); Maena jusculum Cuvier, 1829; Maena maena (Linnaeus, 1758); Maena osbechii Valenciennes, 1830; Maena osbeckii Valenciennes, 1830; Maena vomerina Valenciennes, 1830; Maena vulgaris Valenciennes, 1830; Merolepis chryselis (Valenciennes, 1830); Merolepis maena (Linnaeus, 1758); Smaris cagarella Cuvier, 1829; Smaris chryselis Valenciennes, 1830; Smaris gagarella Valenciennes, 1830; Smaris maena (Linnaeus, 1758); Sparus maena Linnaeus, 1758; Sparus osbeck Lacepède, 1802; Sparus tricuspidatus Spinola, 1807; Sparus zebra Brünnich, 1768; Spicara chryselis (Valenciennes, 1830); Spicara maena maena (Linnaeus, 1758)

= Spicara maena =

Species of fish

Spicara maena, the blotched picarel, is a species of ray-finned fish native to the eastern Atlantic Ocean, the Mediterranean Sea and the Black Sea. The male grows to a maximum length of about 25 cm (10 in), and the female reaches 21 cm (8 in). This fish is fished commercially in some areas.

== Taxonomy ==
Spicara maena was first formally described as Sparus maena by Carl Linnaeus in the 10th edition of Systema Naturae published in 1758, with its type locality given as the Mediterranean. Genetic studies have confirmed that Spicara flexuosa is a separate species, not a synonym of S. maena The 5th edition of Fishes of the World classifies the genus Spicarain the family Sparidae within the order Spariformes by the 5th edition of Fishes of the World. Some authorities classify this genus in the subfamily Boopsinae, but the 5th edition of Fishes of the World does not recognise subfamilies within the Sparidae.

== Etymology ==
Spicara maena has the genus name Spicara, which is a vernacular name for picarels, particularly S. flexuosa in Italy. This is presumed to derive from spica, "a spike", or spicare, meaning "in the form of or furnished with a spike", Rafinesque did not explain why he chose this name. The specific name, maena, is a latinisation of maenis an Ancient Greek name for picarels, dating from at least the time of Aristotle.

== Description ==
Spicara maena is a fairly deep-bodied fish, with males reaching a maximum length of about 25 cm (10 in) and females 21 cm (8 in). The upper jaw is protrusible and the mouth contains several rows of small teeth. The single dorsal fin has eleven spines and twelve soft rays and the anal fin has three spines and nine or ten soft rays. There are sixty-eight to seventy scales on the lateral line. This fish is blue-grey above with silvery sides and a scattering of small dark spots. There is usually one large dark blotch above the tip of the pectoral fin. Spicara maena is a rather variable species. It has many synonyms across its wide range and is often confused with the common picarel Spicara smaris.

== Distribution and habitat ==
Spicara maena is found in the Eastern Atlantic, the Mediterranean Sea and the Black Sea. Its Atlantic range extends from Morocco and the Canary Islands northwards to Portugal. Its depth range is about 30 to 90 m (98 to 295 ft). It lives near the seabed over sandy and muddy bottoms and in seagrass (Posidonia oceanica) meadows.

== Biology ==
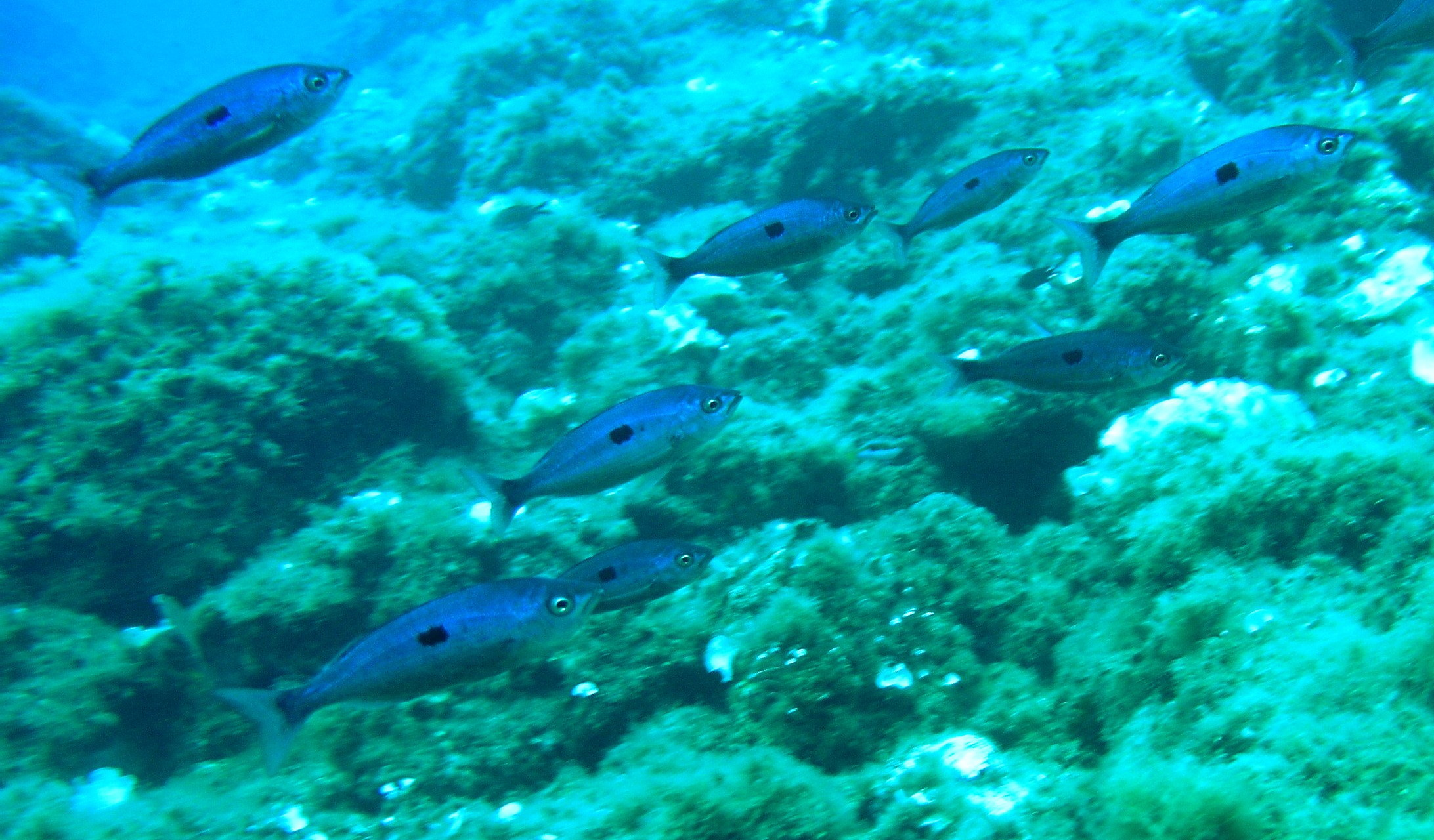
Several Spicara maena

Spicara maena is a gregarious fish that moves in schools and feeds on small benthic invertebrates and zooplankton. It is a protogynous hermaphrodite, starting life as a female and later changing into a male. In a study in the Gulf of İzmir in the Aegean Sea by Soykan and colleagues it was found that there are almost five times as many females as males and that the change of sex on average takes place within the length range 14.5 to 15 cm (5.7 to 5.9 in) and that all fish longer than 18 cm (7.1 in) are male. A study off the eastern central coast of the Adriatic Sea by Dulčić and colleagues found that the sex conversion on average happened between 17.5 and 18 cm (6.9 and 7.1 in) and that any fish longer than 19.8 cm (7.8 in) were male. The females become mature at the age of two years and spawning takes place between March and June in the Aegean, and between August and October further west in the Mediterranean. The male digs a hollow on the seabed and the female lays eggs with a sticky surface in this nest.
