= Rineloricaria parva =

Conservation status
- Least Concern (IUCN 3.1)

Scientific classification
- Kingdom: Animalia
- Phylum: Chordata
- Class: Actinopterygii
- Order: Siluriformes
- Family: Loricariidae
- Genus: Rineloricaria
- Species: R. parva

Binomial name
- Rineloricaria parva (Boulenger, 1895)

Synonyms
- Hemiloricaria parva Boulenger, 1895; Loricaria parva (Boulenger, 1895)

Species of catfish

Rineloricaria parva is a species of freshwater ray-finned fish belonging to the family Loricariidae, the suckermouth armored catfishes, and the subfamily Loricariinae, the mailed catfishes. This catfish occurs in the Paraguay, Uruguay, and lower and middle Paraná River basins in Brazil, Argentina, Bolivia, Paraguay, and Uruguay. This species reaches a standard length of 11 cm (4.3 in) and is believed to be a facultative air-breather.

Rineloricaria parva appears in the aquarium trade, where it is sometimes referred to as the common whiptail catfish.
