= Rineloricaria microlepidogaster =

Conservation status
- Least Concern (IUCN 3.1)

Scientific classification
- Kingdom: Animalia
- Phylum: Chordata
- Class: Actinopterygii
- Order: Siluriformes
- Family: Loricariidae
- Genus: Rineloricaria
- Species: R. microlepidogaster

Binomial name
- Rineloricaria microlepidogaster (Regan, 1904)

Synonyms
- Loricaria microlepidogaster Regan, 1904

Species of catfish

Rineloricaria microlepidogaster is a species of freshwater ray-finned fish belonging to the family Loricariidae, the suckermouth armored catfishes, and the subfamily Loricariinae, the mailed catfishes. This catfish occurs in the Lagoa dos Patos basin in the state of Rio Grande do Sul in southern Brazil. It is typically seen in environments with slow to fast water flow, clear to brown water, and a substrate composed of rocks, sand, or mud, including polluted waters. The species reaches a standard length of 19.3 cm (7.6 in) and is believed to be a facultative air-breather.
