= Rineloricaria cubataonis =

Conservation status
- Data Deficient (IUCN 3.1)

Scientific classification
- Kingdom: Animalia
- Phylum: Chordata
- Class: Actinopterygii
- Order: Siluriformes
- Family: Loricariidae
- Genus: Rineloricaria
- Species: R. cubataonis

Binomial name
- Rineloricaria cubataonis (Steindachner, 1907)

Synonyms
- Loricaria cubataonis Steindachner, 1907

Species of catfish

Rineloricaria cubataonis is a species of freshwater ray-finned fish belonging to the family Loricariidae, the suckermouth armored catfishes, and the subfamily Loricariinae, the mailed catfishes. This catfish is known only from its holotype which was collected from the Cubatão River at Colônia Theresopolis, in the state of Santa Catarina. The holotype has a standard length of 5.4 cm (2.1 in) and this species is believed to be a facultative air-breather.
