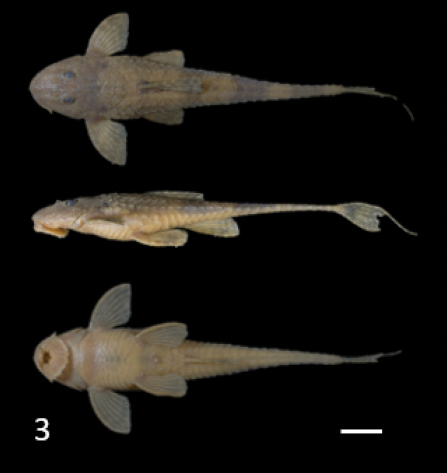

Conservation status
- Least Concern (IUCN 3.1)

Scientific classification
- Kingdom: Animalia
- Phylum: Chordata
- Class: Actinopterygii
- Division: Teleostei
- Order: Siluriformes
- Family: Loricariidae
- Genus: Rineloricaria
- Species: R. latirostris

Binomial name
- Rineloricaria latirostris (Boulenger, 1900)

Synonyms
- Loricaria latirostris Boulenger, 1900; Loricaria paulina Boulenger, 1900

= Rineloricaria latirostris =

Species of catfish

Rineloricaria latirostris is a species of freshwater ray-finned fish belonging to the family Loricariidae, the suckermouth armored catfishes, and the subfamily Loricariinae, the mailed catfishes. This catfish is found in the upper Paraná River basin in Brazil. This species reaches a total length of 36 cm (14 in) and is believed to be a facultative air-breather.
