= Rineloricaria maacki =

Conservation status
- Least Concern (IUCN 3.1)

Scientific classification
- Kingdom: Animalia
- Phylum: Chordata
- Class: Actinopterygii
- Order: Siluriformes
- Family: Loricariidae
- Genus: Rineloricaria
- Species: R. maacki

Binomial name
- Rineloricaria maacki Ingenito, Ghazzi, Duboc & Abilhoa, 2008

Species of catfish

Rineloricaria maacki is a species of freshwater ray-finned fish is a species of freshwater ray-finned fish belonging to the family Loricariidae, the suckermouth armored catfishes, and the subfamily Loricariinae, the mailed catfishes. This catfish is found in the middle and lower drainage of the Iguaçu River, a tributary of the Paraná River, in the states of Santa Catarina and Rio Grande do Sul in southern Brazil. It is typically found in environments characterized by muddy and medium-to-fast-flowing water, a substrate composed primarily of sand, and little to no marginal vegetation. The species reaches a standard length of 13.6 cm (5.4 in) and is believed to be a facultative air-breather. Its specific name honors Reinhard Maack for his contributions to the geological knowledge of the Iguazu basin.
