= Rineloricaria phoxocephala =

Conservation status
- Least Concern (IUCN 3.1)

Scientific classification
- Kingdom: Animalia
- Phylum: Chordata
- Class: Actinopterygii
- Order: Siluriformes
- Family: Loricariidae
- Genus: Rineloricaria
- Species: R. phoxocephala

Binomial name
- Rineloricaria phoxocephala (C. H. Eigenmann & R. S. Eigenmann, 1889)

Synonyms
- Loricaria phoxocephala C. H. Eigenmann & R. S. Eigenmann, 1889; Hemiloricaria phoxocephala (C. H. Eigenmann & R. S. Eigenmann, 1889)

Species of catfish

Rineloricaria phoxocephala is a species of freshwater ray-finned fish belonging to the family Loricariidae, the suckermouth armored catfishes, and the subfamily Loricariinae, the mailed catfishes. This catfish occurs in the Amazon River basin in the Brazilian states of Acre, Amazonas and Rondônia. The species reaches a standard length of 15 cm (5.9 in) and is believed to be a facultative air-breather.
