= Rineloricaria heteroptera =

Conservation status
- Least Concern (IUCN 3.1)

Scientific classification
- Kingdom: Animalia
- Phylum: Chordata
- Class: Actinopterygii
- Order: Siluriformes
- Family: Loricariidae
- Genus: Rineloricaria
- Species: R. heteroptera

Binomial name
- Rineloricaria heteroptera Isbrücker & Nijssen, 1979

Synonyms
- Leliella heteroptera (Isbrücker & Nijssen 1979)

Species of catfish

Rineloricaria heteroptera is a species of freshwater ray-finned fish belonging to the family Loricariidae, the suckermouth armored catfishes, and the subfamily Loricariinae, the mailed catfishes. This catfish is found in the basins of the Amazon and Orinoco in Brazil, Colombia, and Venezuela. This species reaches a standard length of 13.3 cm (5.2 in) and is believed to be a facultative air-breather.
