= Rineloricaria sanga =

Conservation status
- Least Concern (IUCN 3.1)

Scientific classification
- Kingdom: Animalia
- Phylum: Chordata
- Class: Actinopterygii
- Order: Siluriformes
- Family: Loricariidae
- Genus: Rineloricaria
- Species: R. sanga

Binomial name
- Rineloricaria sanga Ghazzi, 2008

Species of catfish

Rineloricaria sanga is a species of freshwater ray-finned fish belonging to the family Loricariidae, the suckermouth armored catfishes, and the subfamily Loricariinae, the mailed catfishes. This catfish is known only from the Uruguay River basin near Iraí in the southern Brazilian states of Rio Grande do Sul and Santa Catarina. The species reaches a standard length of 10 cm (3.9 in) and is believed to be a facultative air-breather.
