= Rineloricaria jaraguensis =

Conservation status
- Least Concern (IUCN 3.1)

Scientific classification
- Kingdom: Animalia
- Phylum: Chordata
- Class: Actinopterygii
- Order: Siluriformes
- Family: Loricariidae
- Genus: Rineloricaria
- Species: R. jaraguensis

Binomial name
- Rineloricaria jaraguensis (Steindachner, 1909)

Synonyms
- Loricaria jaraguensis Steindachner, 1909

Species of catfish

Rineloricaria jaraguensis is a species of freshwater ray-finned fish belonging to the family Loricariidae, the suckermouth armored catfishes, and the subfamily Loricariinae, the mailed catfishes. This catfish is found in the Itapocu River basin, part of the drainage in the municipality of Jaraguá do Sul in the state of Santa Catarina in Brazil. This species reaches a standard length of 18.5 cm (7.3 in) and is believed to be a facultative air-breather.
