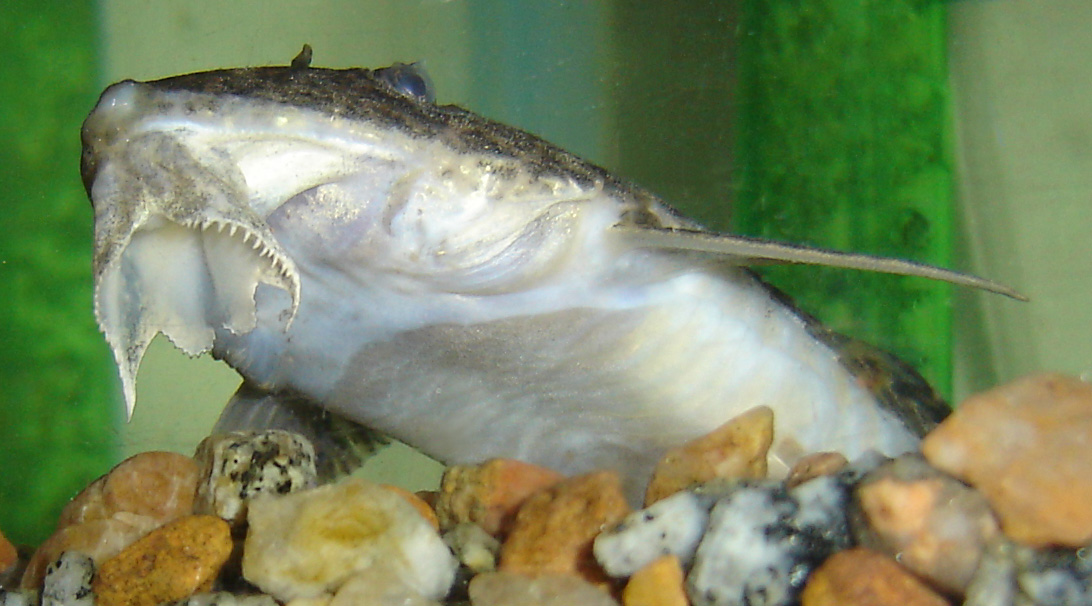

Conservation status
- Least Concern (IUCN 3.1)

Scientific classification
- Kingdom: Animalia
- Phylum: Chordata
- Class: Actinopterygii
- Order: Siluriformes
- Family: Loricariidae
- Genus: Rineloricaria
- Species: R. longicauda

Binomial name
- Rineloricaria longicauda Reis, 1983

= Rineloricaria longicauda =

Species of catfish

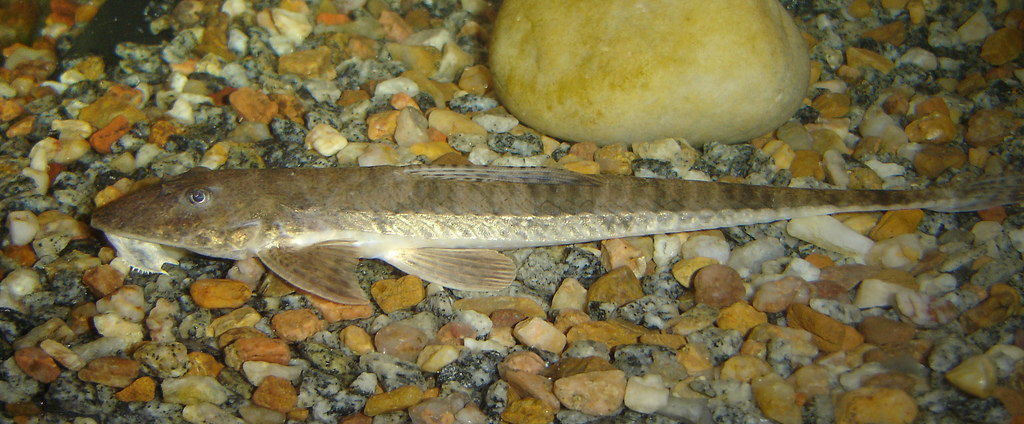
A specimen of Rineloricaria longicauda.

Rineloricaria longicauda, commonly known as the elongated whiptail catfish, is a species of freshwater ray-finned fish belonging to the family Loricariidae, the suckermouth armored catfishes, and the subfamily Loricariinae, the mailed catfishes. This catfish is found in lowland tributaries of the Lagoa Mirim and southern Laguna dos Patos, as well as in small isolated lagoons on the coastal plains south of Tramandaí, in the Brazilian state of Rio Grande do Sul and in Uruguay. This species occurs in environments with clear to brown water, slow to moderate water flow, and substrates made of sand or mud, it is frequently found. The species reaches a standard length of 13.2 cm (5.2 in) and is believed to be a facultative air-breather.
