= Rineloricaria beni =

Conservation status
- Least Concern (IUCN 3.1)

Scientific classification
- Kingdom: Animalia
- Phylum: Chordata
- Class: Actinopterygii
- Order: Siluriformes
- Family: Loricariidae
- Genus: Rineloricaria
- Species: R. beni

Binomial name
- Rineloricaria beni (Pearson, 1924)

Synonyms
- Loricaria beni Pearson, 1924; Hemiloricaria beni (Pearson, 1924)

Species of catfish

Rineloricaria beni is a species of freshwater ray-finned fish belonging to the family Loricariidae, the suckermouth armored catfishes, and the subfamily Loricariinae, the mailed catfishes. This catfish occurs in the Mamoré, Iténez and Noel Kempff Mercado river basins in upp Amazon basin of Bolivia. Its type locality is Rogaguado Lake in the Beni River basin, as reflected in the specific name. The species reaches a standard length of 7.8 cm (3.1 in) and is believed to be a facultative air-breather.

Rineloricaria beni sometimes appears in the aquarium trade, where it is often referred to as the dwarf whiptail catfish.
