= Rineloricaria wolfei =

Conservation status
- Least Concern (IUCN 3.1)

Scientific classification
- Kingdom: Animalia
- Phylum: Chordata
- Class: Actinopterygii
- Order: Siluriformes
- Family: Loricariidae
- Genus: Rineloricaria
- Species: R. wolfei

Binomial name
- Rineloricaria wolfei Fowler, 1940

Synonyms
- Hemiloricaria wolfei (Fowler, 1940

Species of catfish

Rineloricaria wolfei is a species of freshwater ray-finned fish belonging to the family Loricariidae, the suckermouth armored catfishes, and the subfamily Loricariinae, the mailed catfishes. This catfish occurs in the Ucayali and Madre de Dios river basins in Peru. This species reaches 14.9 cm (5.9 in) in length and is believed to be a facultative air-breather. The specific name honors Thomas W. Wolfe who was part of the 1937 collecting expedition to the Ucayali River basin led by William C. Morrow.
