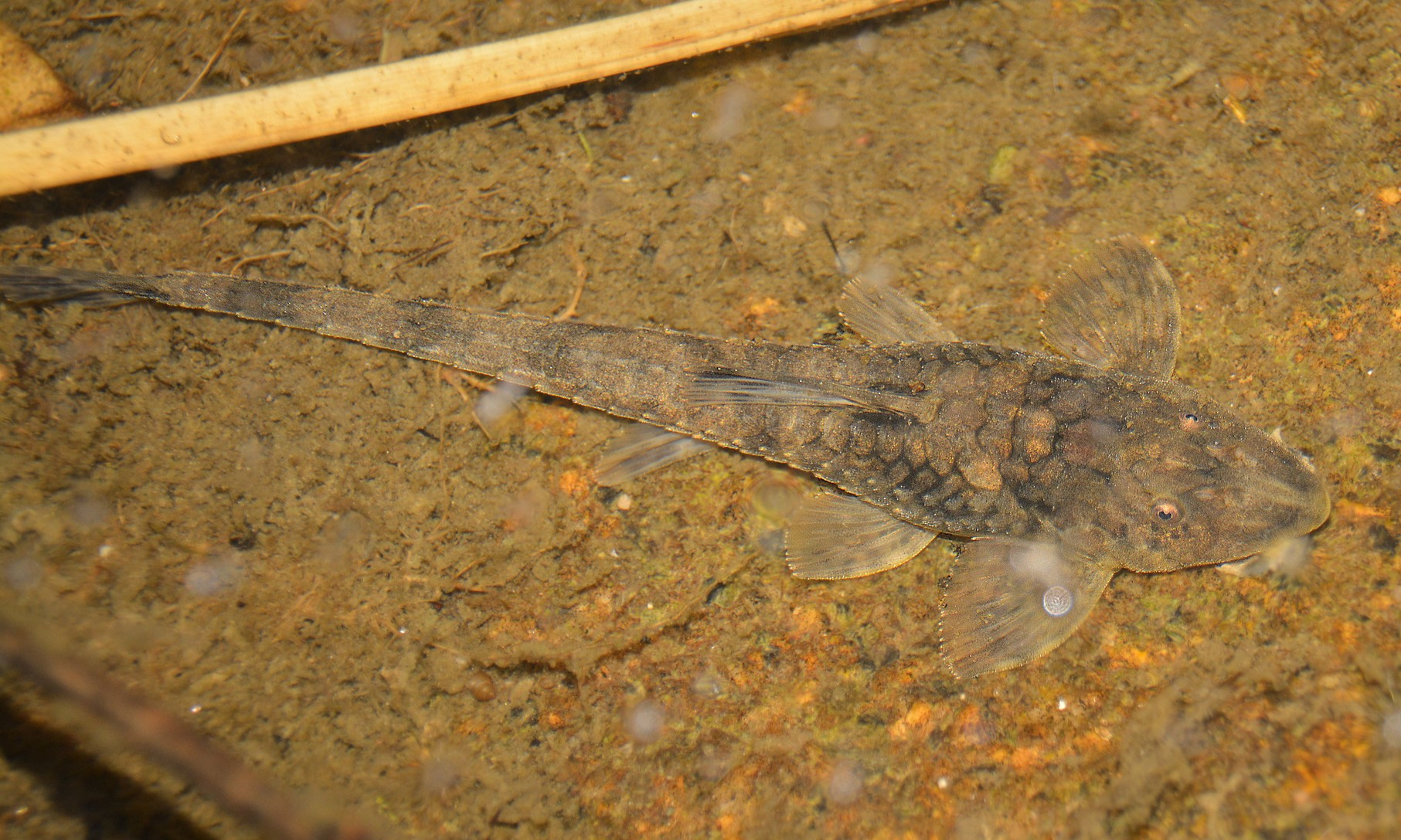

Conservation status
- Least Concern (IUCN 3.1)

Scientific classification
- Kingdom: Animalia
- Phylum: Chordata
- Class: Actinopterygii
- Order: Siluriformes
- Family: Loricariidae
- Genus: Rineloricaria
- Species: R. catamarcensis

Binomial name
- Rineloricaria catamarcensis (Berg, 1895)

Synonyms
- Loricaria catamarcensis Berg, 1895

= Rineloricaria catamarcensis =

Species of catfish

Rineloricaria catamarcensis is a species of freshwater ray-finned fish belonging to the family Loricariidae, the suckermouth armored catfishes, and the subfamily Loricariinae, the mailed catfishes. This catfish is endemic to Argentina, where it has been recorded from the provinces of Buenos Aires, Catamarca, Córdoba, Entre Rios, Jujuy, Misiones, Salta, Santa Fé and Tucumán. This species reaches a standard length of 11 cm (4.3 in) and is believed to be a facultative air-breather.
