= Rineloricaria aurata =

Conservation status
- Least Concern (IUCN 3.1)

Scientific classification
- Kingdom: Animalia
- Phylum: Chordata
- Class: Actinopterygii
- Order: Siluriformes
- Family: Loricariidae
- Genus: Rineloricaria
- Species: R. aurata

Binomial name
- Rineloricaria aurata (Knaack, 2003)

Synonyms
- Hemiloricaria aurata Knaack, 2003

Species of catfish

Rineloricaria aurata s a species of freshwater ray-finned fish belonging to the family Loricariidae, the suckermouth armored catfishes, and the subfamily Loricariinae, the mailed catfishes. This catfish is found in South America, where it occurs in the Paraguay River basin in Brazil and Paraguay. The species is believed to be a facultative air-breather.
