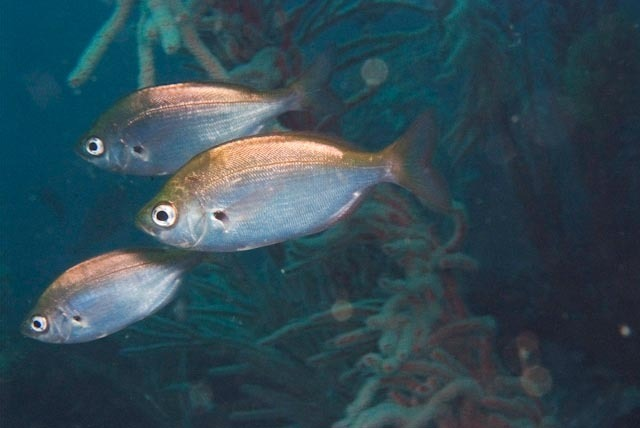

Conservation status
- Least Concern (IUCN 3.1)

Scientific classification
- Kingdom: Animalia
- Phylum: Chordata
- Class: Actinopterygii
- Order: Acanthuriformes
- Family: Sparidae
- Genus: Spicara
- Species: S. axillare

Binomial name
- Spicara axillare (Boulenger, 1900)

Synonyms
- Caesio axillaris Boulenger, 1900; Pterosmaris axillaris (Boulenger, 1900); Caesio algoae J. L. B. Smith, 1935

= Spicara axillare =

Species of fish

Spicara axillare, the windtoy, is a species of marine ray-finned fish belonging to the family Sparidae, the seabreams and porgies. This species is found in the Western Indian Ocean and is endemic to South Africa.

== Taxonomy ==
Spicara axillare was first formally described as Caesio axillaris in 1900 by the Belgian-born British ichthyologist George Albert Boulenger with its type locality given as Buffels Bay in False Bay in the Western Cape of South Africa. The 5th edition of Fishes of the World classifies the genus Spicara in the family Sparidae within the order Spariformes by the 5th edition of Fishes of the World. Some authorities classify this genus in the subfamily Boopsinae, but the 5th edition of Fishes of the World does not recognise subfamilies within the Sparidae.

== Etymology ==
Spicara axillare has the genus name Spicara, which is a vernacular name for picarels, particularly S. flexuosa in Italy. This is presumed to derive from spica, "a spike", or spicare, meaning "in the form of or furnished with a spike", Rafinesque did not explain why he chose this name. The specific name, axillare, means axillary, a reference to the black spot at the base of the pectoral fin.

== Description ==
Spicara axillare has its dorsal fin supported by 11 spines and 12 soft rays while there are 3 spines and 11 soft rays supporting the anal fin, there are also 17 fin rays in the pectoral fin. The pectoral and pelvic fins are scythe shaped and the caudal fin may be crescent shaped or slightly forked. The body has a depth which fits into its standard length 2.3 to 2.8 times. The swim bladder has two lobes at its rear, these lobes extend as far as the haemal spine of the 4th vertebra on the caudal peduncle. The overall colour of the body is golden, with silvery, rosy or bluish tints on the upper body. The windtoy has a maximum published total length of 38 cm (15 in).

== Distribution and habitat ==
Spicara axillare is endemic to South Africa where it occurs from False Bay in the Western Cape to KwaZulu-Natal. It is a pelagic-neritic species that is found at depths between 20 and 160 m (66 and 525 ft), moving closer to shore in stormy weather.
