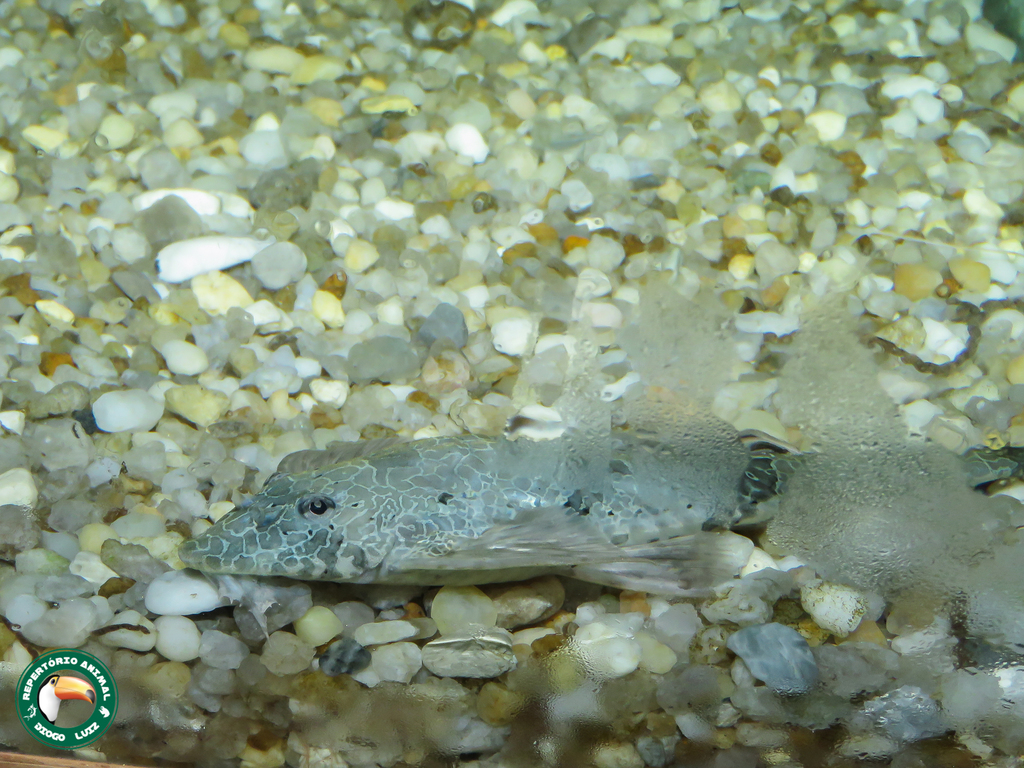

Conservation status
- Least Concern (IUCN 3.1)

Scientific classification
- Kingdom: Animalia
- Phylum: Chordata
- Class: Actinopterygii
- Order: Siluriformes
- Family: Loricariidae
- Genus: Rineloricaria
- Species: R. teffeana

Binomial name
- Rineloricaria teffeana (Steindachner, 1879)

Synonyms
- Loricaria teffeana Steindachner, 1879; Hemiloricaria teffeana (Steindachner, 1879); Loricaria valenciennesii Vaillant, 1880

= Rineloricaria teffeana =

Species of catfish

Rineloricaria teffeana is a species of freshwater ray-finned fish belonging to the family Loricariidae, the suckermouth armored catfishes, and the subfamily Loricariinae, the mailed catfishes.. This catfish it occurs in the Amazon River basin in Brazil, with its type locality being given as the Amazon River near Tefé. This species reaches a standard length of 14 cm (5.5 in) and is believed to be a facultative air-breather.
