= Rineloricaria anitae =

Conservation status
- Data Deficient (IUCN 3.1)

Scientific classification
- Kingdom: Animalia
- Phylum: Chordata
- Class: Actinopterygii
- Order: Siluriformes
- Family: Loricariidae
- Genus: Rineloricaria
- Species: R. anitae

Binomial name
- Rineloricaria anitae Ghazzi, 2008

Species of catfish

Rineloricaria anitae is a species of freshwater ray-finned fish belonging to the family Loricariidae, the suckermouth armored catfishes, and the subfamily Loricariinae, the mailed catfishes. It is known only from its type locality, the Canoas River in Santa Catarina in Brazil. The species reaches a standard length of 11.7 cm (4.6 in) and is believed to be a facultative air-breather. The specific name, anitaea, honors Anita Garibaldi, the Brazilian revolutionary and wife of Giuseppe Garibaldi, an important participant in te failed war of secession from the Brazilian Empire, the Ragamuffin War.
