= Rineloricaria isaaci =

Conservation status
- Least Concern (IUCN 3.1)

Scientific classification
- Kingdom: Animalia
- Phylum: Chordata
- Class: Actinopterygii
- Division: Teleostei
- Order: Siluriformes
- Family: Loricariidae
- Genus: Rineloricaria
- Species: R. isaaci

Binomial name
- Rineloricaria isaaci M. S. Rodriguez & Miquelarena, 2008

Species of catfish

Rineloricaria isaaci is a species of freshwater ray-finned fish belonging to the family Loricariidae, the suckermouth armored catfishes, and the subfamily Loricariinae, the mailed catfishes. This catfish occurs in the Uruguay River basin in Argentina, Brazil, and Uruguay. This species reaches a standard length of 10.23 cm (4.03 in) and is believed to be a facultative air-breather. The specific name honors the Dutch ichthyologist Isaäc J. H. Isbrücker in recognition of his work on the mailed catfishes.
