= Rineloricaria osvaldoi =

Conservation status
- Least Concern (IUCN 3.1)

Scientific classification
- Kingdom: Animalia
- Phylum: Chordata
- Class: Actinopterygii
- Order: Siluriformes
- Family: Loricariidae
- Genus: Rineloricaria
- Species: R. osvaldoi

Binomial name
- Rineloricaria osvaldoi Fichberg & Chamon, 2008

Species of catfish

Rineloricaria osvaldoi is a species of freshwater ray-finned fish belonging to the family Loricariidae, the suckermouth armored catfishes, and the subfamily Loricariinae, the mailed catfishes. This catfish occurs in the drainage basin of the Vermelho River, which is itself a tributary of the Araguaia River, in the Brazilian state of Goiás. This species reaches a standard length of 16.8 cm (6.6 in) and is believed to be a facultative air-breather. The Specific name honors the Brazilian ichthyologist Osvaldo Takeshi Oyakawa, of the Museu de Zoologia da Universidade de São Paulo, who is a specialist in the catfishes in the subfamily Loricariinae.
