= Rineloricaria maquinensis =

Conservation status
- Least Concern (IUCN 3.1)

Scientific classification
- Kingdom: Animalia
- Phylum: Chordata
- Class: Actinopterygii
- Order: Siluriformes
- Family: Loricariidae
- Genus: Rineloricaria
- Species: R. maquinensis

Binomial name
- Rineloricaria maquinensis Reis & Cardoso, 2001

Species of catfish

Rineloricaria maquinensis is a species of freshwater ray-finned fish belonging to the family Loricariidae, the suckermouth armored catfishes, and the subfamily Loricariinae, the mailed catfishes. This catfish occurs in the basins of the Maquiné River and the Araranguá River in the states of Rio Grande do Sul and Santa Catarina in southeastern Brazil. It is typically found in small creeks with clear, shallow water and rocky substrates. The species reaches a standard length of 8.5 cm (3.3 in) and is believed to be a facultative air-breather.
