= Rineloricaria felipponei =

Conservation status
- Data Deficient (IUCN 3.1)

Scientific classification
- Kingdom: Animalia
- Phylum: Chordata
- Class: Actinopterygii
- Order: Siluriformes
- Family: Loricariidae
- Genus: Rineloricaria
- Species: R. felipponei

Binomial name
- Rineloricaria felipponei (Fowler, 1943)

Synonyms
- Loricaria felipponei Fowler, 1943

Species of catfish

Rineloricaria felipponei is a species of freshwater ray-finned fish belonging to the family Loricariidae, the suckermouth armored catfishes, and the subfamily Loricariinae, the mailed catfishes. This catfish is not universally regarded as a valid species, as the description is based on very few specimens, the type locality is given as Uruguay and the paratypes have been collected from the Santa Lucía River Canelones in Uruguay, it is not known from any other locality. This species reaches a standard length of 11.3 cm (4.4 in) and is believed to be a facultative air-breather.

The specific name honors the Uruguayan biologist Florentino Felippone, the collector of the holotype.
