= Rineloricaria strigilata =

Conservation status
- Least Concern (IUCN 3.1)

Scientific classification
- Kingdom: Animalia
- Phylum: Chordata
- Class: Actinopterygii
- Order: Siluriformes
- Family: Loricariidae
- Genus: Rineloricaria
- Species: R. strigilata

Binomial name
- Rineloricaria strigilata (Hensel, 1868)

Synonyms
- Loricaria strigilata Hensel, 1868

Species of catfish

Rineloricaria strigilata, commonly known as the Santa Cruz whiptail catfish, is a species of freshwater ray-finned fish belonging to the family Loricariidae, the suckermouth armored catfishes, and the subfamily Loricariinae, the mailed catfishes.. This catfish it occursin the southern Brazilian sata of Rio Grande do Sul and Uruguay, with its type locality being listed as the Lagoa dos Patos basin near Santa Cruz do Sul. It is typically found in environments with slow to fast water flow, clear to brown water, and a substrate composed of sand or mud. This species reaches a standard length of 13.9 cm (5.5 in) and is believed to be a facultative air-breather.
