= Rineloricaria sneiderni =

Conservation status
- Data Deficient (IUCN 3.1)

Scientific classification
- Kingdom: Animalia
- Phylum: Chordata
- Class: Actinopterygii
- Division: Teleostei
- Order: Siluriformes
- Family: Loricariidae
- Genus: Rineloricaria
- Species: R. sneiderni

Binomial name
- Rineloricaria sneiderni (Fowler, 1944)

Synonyms
- Loricaria sneiderni Fowler, 1944; Hemiloricaria sneiderni (Fowler, 1944)

Species of catfish

Rineloricaria sneiderni is a species of freshwater ray-finned fish belonging to the family Loricariidae, the suckermouth armored catfishes, and the subfamily Loricariinae, the mailed catfishes.. This catfish occurs in high-altitude brooks in the Jurubidá River basin in Colombia, with its type locality being listed as near Nuquí. The species reaches 18 cm (7.1 in) in length and is believed to be a facultative air-breather. The specific name honors the collector of the holotype, the Swedish ornithologist Kjell von Sneidern.
