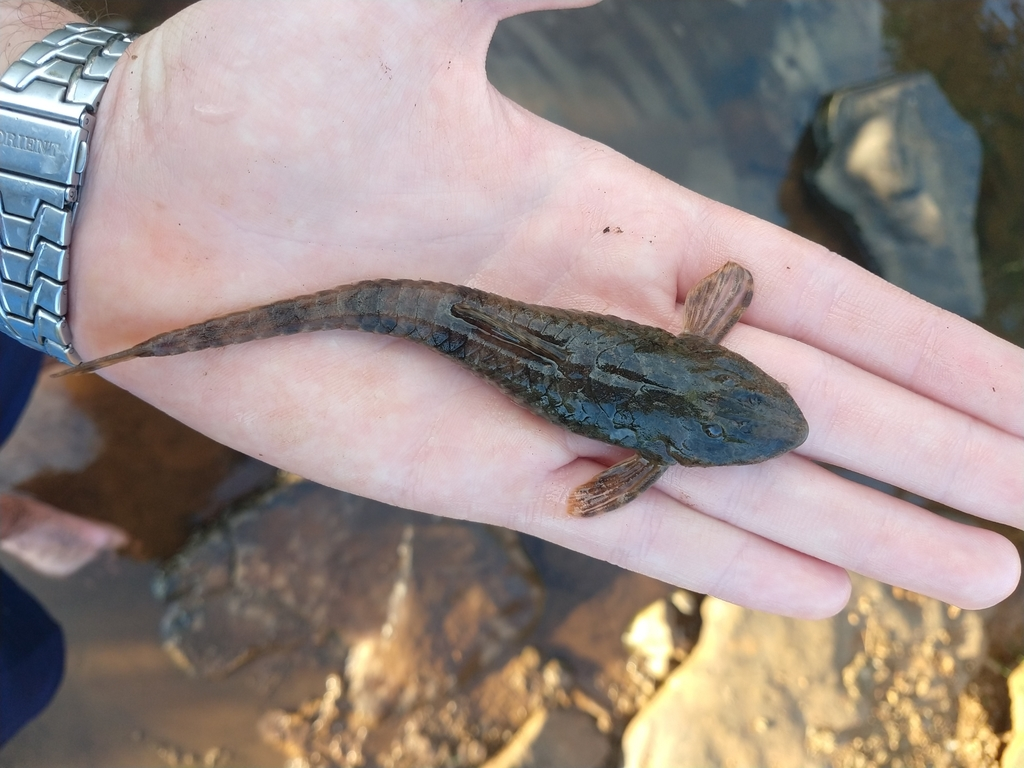

Conservation status
- Least Concern (IUCN 3.1)

Scientific classification
- Kingdom: Animalia
- Phylum: Chordata
- Class: Actinopterygii
- Order: Siluriformes
- Family: Loricariidae
- Genus: Rineloricaria
- Species: R. zaina

Binomial name
- Rineloricaria zaina Ghazzi, 2008

= Rineloricaria zaina =

Species of catfish

Rineloricaria zaina is a species of freshwater ray-finned fish belonging to the family Loricariidae, the suckermouth armored catfishes, and the subfamily Loricariinae, the mailed catfishes. This catfish occurs in the Uruguay River basin in the southern Brazilian states of Rio Grande do Sul and Santa Catarina as well as in Misiones Province in Argentina. This species reaches a standard length of 13.9 cm (5.5 in) and is believed to be a facultative air-breather.
