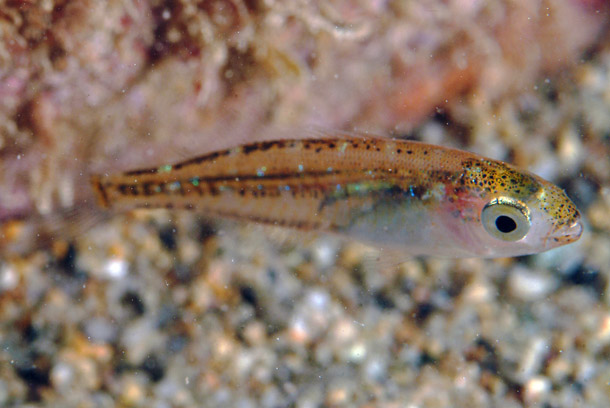
- Curled picarel (C. cirrus)

Scientific classification
- Kingdom: Animalia
- Phylum: Chordata
- Class: Actinopterygii
- Order: Acanthuriformes
- Family: Sparidae
- Genus: Centracanthus; Rafinesque, 1810

Type species
- Centracanthus cirrus Rafinesque, 1810

Species
- see text

= Centracanthus =

Genus of fishes

Centracanthus is a genus of marine ray-finned fishes belonging to the family Sparidae, the seabreams and porgies. There is a single extant species in this genus, as well as an extinct species classified within the genus. The extant species is found in the eastern Atlantic Ocean, the Mediterranean Sea and Black Sea.

== Taxonomy ==
Centracanthus was first proposed as a monospecific genus in 1810 by the French naturalist and polymath Constantine Samuel Rafinesque when he described Centracanthus cirrus, giving its type locality as Sicily. The genus was considered to be monospecific untIl a fossil species, C. pobedinae, from the Miocene was described from Kazakhstan in 2015. This genus is placed in the family Sparidae within the order Spariformes by the 5th edition of Fishes of the World. Some authorities classify this genus in the monotypic subfamily Centracanthinae, but the 5th edition of Fishes of the World does not recognise subfamilies within the Sparidae. This genus and the genus Spicara were considered to belong to a separate family, Centracanthidae, but phylogenetic analyses resolved that the Sparidae was paraphyletic if Centracanthus and Spicara were not included within it.

== Etymology ==
Centracanthus is a combination of centron, meaning “point”, and acanthus, which means “thorn” or “spine”, this may be a reference to what Rafinesque described as two dorsal fins with “some rays or loose thorns between them and their membranes”. In fact, there is a single dorsal fin with a dip in its middle section.

== Species ==
There are two species classified within the genus:

- Centracanthus cirrus Rafinesque, 1810 (Curled picarel)
- † Centracanthus pobedinae Bratishko, et al. 2015

== Characteristics ==
Centracanthus have strongly protrusible mouths and elongate bodies which are shallower than the length of the head and with a standard length which is 5 to 5.6 times its depth. There is a wide incision in the middle of the dorsal fin. The fossil species, C. pobedinae was identified by its distinctive otoliths.

== Distribution ==
Centracanthus are found in the temperate western Atlantic Ocean as far north as Portugal and south to the Canary Islands, into the Mediterranean Sea and the Black Sea. C. cirrus has also been reported from Cape Verde and Mauritania.
