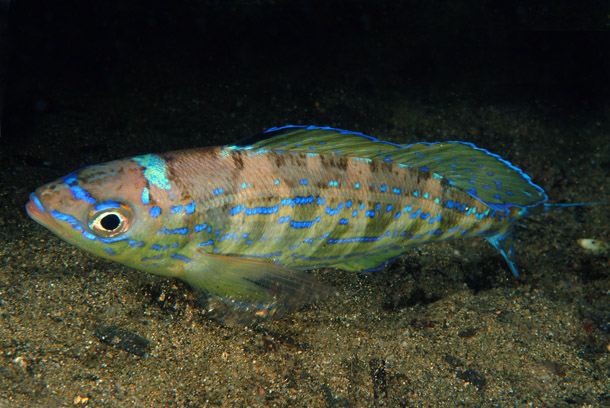

Conservation status
- Least Concern (IUCN 3.1)

Scientific classification
- Kingdom: Animalia
- Phylum: Chordata
- Class: Actinopterygii
- Division: Teleostei
- Order: Acanthuriformes
- Family: Sparidae
- Genus: Spicara
- Species: S. smaris

Binomial name
- Spicara smaris (Linnaeus, 1758)

Synonyms
- Maena smaris (Linnaeus, 1758); Smaris alcedo (Risso, 1810); Smaris gracilis Bonaparte, 1836; Smaris maurii Bonaparte, 1836; Smaris smaris (Linnaeus, 1758); Smaris vulgaris Valenciennes, 1830; Sparus alcedo Risso, 1810; Sparus smaris Linnaeus, 1758; Spicara alcedo (Risso, 1810)

= Spicara smaris =

Species of ray-finned fish

Spicara smaris, one of the picarels, is a species of ray-finned fish belonging to the family Sparidae, the seabreams and porgies. This species is found in the eastern Atlantic Ocean, the Mediterranean Sea and the Black Sea. It grows to a maximum length of about 20 cm (8 in); females are usually smaller than males.

== Taxonomy ==
Spicara smaris was first formally described as Sparus smaris by Carl Linnaeus in the 10th edition of Systema Naturae published in 1758, with its type locality given as the Southern Europe. The 5th edition of Fishes of the World classifies the genus Spicara in the family Sparidae within the order Spariformes by the 5th edition of Fishes of the World. Some authorities classify this genus in the subfamily Boopsinae, but the 5th edition of Fishes of the World does not recognise subfamilies within the Sparidae.

== Etymology ==
Spicara smaris has the genus name Spicara, which is a vernacular name for picarels, particularly S. flexuosa in Italy. This is presumed to derive from spica, "a spike", or spicare, meaning "in the form of or furnished with a spike", Rafinesque did not explain why he chose this name. The specific name, smaris, is an Ancient Greek name for this species, dating from at least the time of Aristotle.

== Description ==
Spicara smaris grows to a maximum length of 20 cm (8 in) but a more common maximum size is 15 cm (6 in). It is a more slender fish than the closely related blotched picarel (Spicara maena) and can be distinguished from that species by having 75–81 scales along the lateral line rather than 68–70. Its back is grey-brown and it has silvery flanks with a large black spot located above the tip of the pectoral fin. Male fish are usually larger than females and have small blue spots scattered across the dorsal and anal fins.

== Distribution and habitat ==
Spicara smaris is native to the subtropical eastern Atlantic Ocean including the coasts of Portugal, the Canary Islands and Morocco, the Mediterranean Sea and the Black Sea. It is usually found in seagrass meadows and over sandy and muddy seabeds. Its depth range is generally 15 to 170 m (49 to 558 ft) but it has been recorded at depths of 328 m (1,076 ft) in the eastern Ionian Sea.

== Biology ==
Spicara smaris is a sociable fish, forming large groups with others of its species. It is a protogynous sequential hermaphrodite, individuals maturing as females and becoming males at some later point. All individuals over about 17.9 cm (7.0 in) are male and the maximum age for a male is six years while for a female it is four. Breeding takes place once a year and the colour of a male becomes brighter at this time. The male will scoop out a circular nest in soft sediment in which the female will lay eggs. The male then guards these until they hatch, after which time his bright colours fade and he rejoins other schooling fish. Recent observations have revealed that Spicara smaris can form massive breeding colonies covering extensive areas on the seabed, a behavior that is considered exceptional among marine fishes.

== As food ==
Spicara smaris is a popular food in parts of southern Italy, Dalmatia, and Greece. In Dalmatia, salted picarel, slana gira, are popular. Picarel is one of the five most commonly caught fish in Cyprus. In Greece and Cyprus, picarel, marida, is generally battered and fried, and eaten whole, including the head, tail, and bones.
