= Rineloricaria langei =

Conservation status
- Least Concern (IUCN 3.1)

Scientific classification
- Kingdom: Animalia
- Phylum: Chordata
- Class: Actinopterygii
- Order: Siluriformes
- Family: Loricariidae
- Genus: Rineloricaria
- Species: R. langei

Binomial name
- Rineloricaria langei Ingenito, Ghazzi, Duboc & Abilhoa, 2008

Species of catfish

Rineloricaria langei is a species of freshwater ray-finned fish is a species of freshwater ray-finned fish belonging to the family Loricariidae, the suckermouth armored catfishes, and the subfamily Loricariinae, the mailed catfishes. This catfish occurs in the Iraí River, a tributary of the Iguazu River in the Curitiba metropilitan region in the state of Paraná. It is typically found in small streams with slow to moderate flow and a substrate composed primarily of sand, although rocks and organic debris are also usually present. This species reaches a standard length of 11.7 cm (4.6 in) and is believed to be a facultative air-breather. The specific name honors the Brazilian biologist Rudolf Bruno Lange.
