= Rineloricaria malabarbai =

Conservation status
- Least Concern (IUCN 3.1)

Scientific classification
- Kingdom: Animalia
- Phylum: Chordata
- Class: Actinopterygii
- Order: Siluriformes
- Family: Loricariidae
- Genus: Rineloricaria
- Species: R. malabarbai

Binomial name
- Rineloricaria malabarbai M. S. Rodriguez & R. E. dos Reis, 2008

Species of catfish

Rineloricaria malabarbai is a species of freshwater ray-finned fish belonging to the family Loricariidae, the suckermouth armored catfishes, and the subfamily Loricariinae, the mailed catfishes. This catfish occurs in the basins of the Jacuí River and the Camaquã River which drain into the Lagoa dos Patos in the state of Rio Grande do Sul in southeastern Brazil. It is typically found in environments with slow to fast water flow, clear to brown water, and rocky substrates. The species reaches a standard length of 10 cm (3.9 in) and is believed to be a facultative air-breather.

== Etymology ==
The specific name of R. malabarbai honors Luiz Roberto Malabarba for his contributions to the ichthyology of the Neotropical realm.
