= Rineloricaria jubata =

Conservation status
- Least Concern (IUCN 3.1)

Scientific classification
- Kingdom: Animalia
- Phylum: Chordata
- Class: Actinopterygii
- Order: Siluriformes
- Family: Loricariidae
- Genus: Rineloricaria
- Species: R. jubata

Binomial name
- Rineloricaria jubata (Boulenger, 1902)

Synonyms
- Loricaria jubata Boulenger, 1902; Hemiloricaria jubata (Boulenger, 1902)

Species of catfish

Rineloricaria jubata is a species of freshwater ray-finned fish belonging to the family Loricariidae, the suckermouth armored catfishes, and the subfamily Loricariinae, the mailed catfishes. This catfish is found in Colombia and Ecuador, in the basin of Santiago-Cayapas rivers in Ecuuador; in the Pacific versant drainages of the Atrato, Baudo, San Juan and Telembi Rivers; and in the Caribbean versant Cauca and Patia Rivers, in Colombia. This species reaches a standard length of 21 cm (8.3 in) and is believed to be a facultative air-breather.
