= Rineloricaria cadeae =

Conservation status
- Least Concern (IUCN 3.1)

Scientific classification
- Kingdom: Animalia
- Phylum: Chordata
- Class: Actinopterygii
- Order: Siluriformes
- Family: Loricariidae
- Genus: Rineloricaria
- Species: R. cadeae

Binomial name
- Rineloricaria cadeae (Hensel, 1868)

Synonyms
- Loricaria cadeae Hensel, 1868

Species of catfish

Rineloricaria cadeae, sometimes known as the Cadéa whiptail catfish,, is a species of freshwater ray-finned fish belonging to the family Loricariidae, the suckermouth armored catfishes, and the subfamily Loricariinae, the mailed catfishes. found in Brazil and Uruguay, including the Lagoa dos Patos drainage basin and the Cadeia River, for which it is named. It is typically found in areas with flowing water of variable speed and turbidity, with a variety of substrates also being reported as habitat for the species. Adult individuals of the species are frequently found in sandy areas, whereas juveniles are believed to prefer the leaves of marginal vegetation. The species reaches a standard length ov 12 cm (4.7 in) and is believed to be a facultative air-breather.
