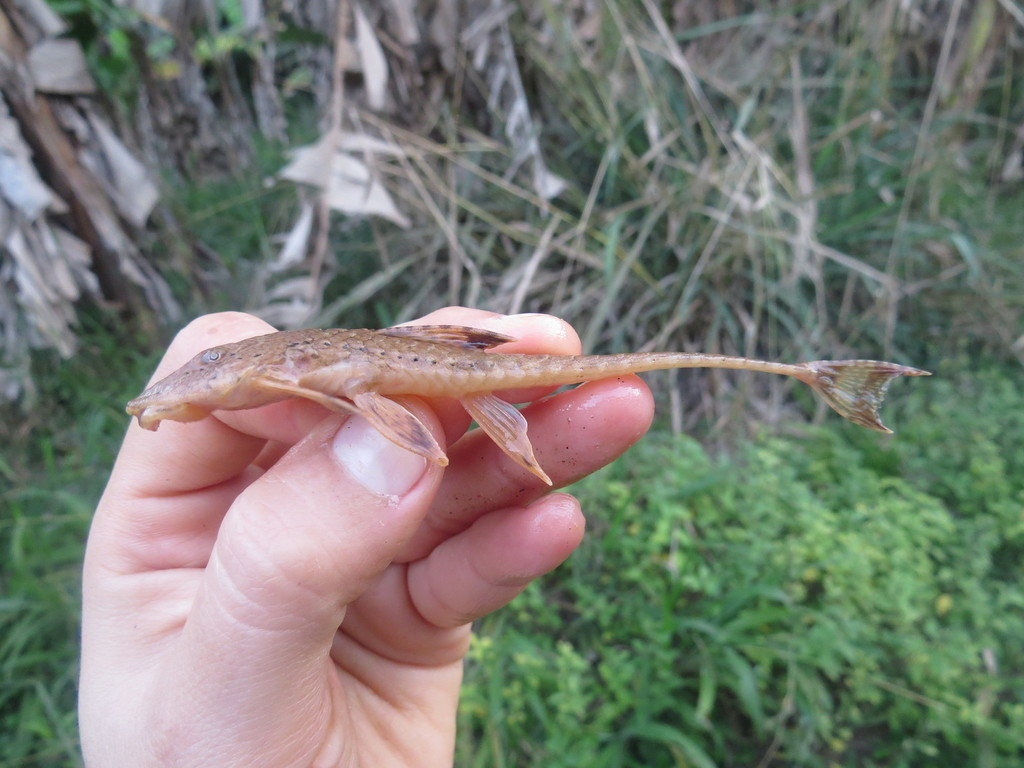

Conservation status
- Least Concern (IUCN 3.1)

Scientific classification
- Kingdom: Animalia
- Phylum: Chordata
- Class: Actinopterygii
- Order: Siluriformes
- Family: Loricariidae
- Genus: Rineloricaria
- Species: R. nigricauda

Binomial name
- Rineloricaria nigricauda (Regan, 1904)

Synonyms
- Loricaria nigricauda Regan, 1904; Hemiloricaria nigricauda (Regan,1904)

= Rineloricaria nigricauda =

Species of catfish

Rineloricaria nigricauda is a species of freshwater ray-finned fish belonging to the family Loricariidae, the suckermouth armored catfishes, and the subfamily Loricariinae, the mailed catfishes. This catfish occurs the Paraíba do Sul river basin in the southern Brazilian states of Minas Gerais, Rio de Janeiro and São Paulo, and in coatsal rivers in Rio de Janeiro. This species reaches a standard length of 6.5 cm (2.6 in) and is believed to be a facultative air-breather.
