= Nigricauda =

Nigricauda, a Latin word meaning black-tailed, may refer to:

- B. nigricauda
  - Brycinus nigricauda, Thys van den Audenaerde, 1974, a ray-finned fish species in the genus Brycinus
- D. nigricauda
  - Dasymutilla nigricauda, a wasp species in the genus Dasymutilla
- E. nigricauda
  - Enneapterygius nigricauda, Fricke, 1997, the blacktail triplefin, a fish species in the genus Enneapterygius
- N. nigricauda
  - Nephrotoma nigricauda, Alexander, 1925, a species in the genus ''Nephrotoma
- R. nigricauda
  - Rineloricaria nigricauda, a freshwater tropical catfish species in the genus Rineloricaria

== Subspecies ==
- Leucauge decorata nigricauda, Schenkel, 1944, a subspecies in the spider species Leucauge decorata and the genus Leucauge found in Timor
- a race of the white-rumped shama, a small passerine bird

== See also ==
- Nigricaudus
