= Rineloricaria lima =

Conservation status
- Data Deficient (IUCN 3.1)

Scientific classification
- Kingdom: Animalia
- Phylum: Chordata
- Class: Actinopterygii
- Order: Siluriformes
- Family: Loricariidae
- Genus: Rineloricaria
- Species: R. lima

Binomial name
- Rineloricaria lima (Kner, 1853)

Synonyms
- Loricaria lima Kner, 1853

Species of catfish

Rineloricaria lima is a species of freshwater ray-finned fish belonging to the family Loricariidae, the suckermouth armored catfishes, and the subfamily Loricariinae, the mailed catfishes.

Rineloricaria lima is known only from its original description, which was based on a single specimen which was dead and dried when it was collected, then taken to Vienna and has been lost. The type locality was given only as "Brazil". It is the type species of the genus Rineloricaria, and it was collected by Johann Natterer from “Brazilian rivers” during 1817-1835 when he lived in Brazil. The original description is inadequate and sets out characteristics which apply to most species in the genus. As the type specimen has been lost, the lack of accuracy of the type locality and the extensive nature of Johann Natterer's travels in Brazil, it is not simple to apply the name to any specimen and a neotype may need to be designated.
