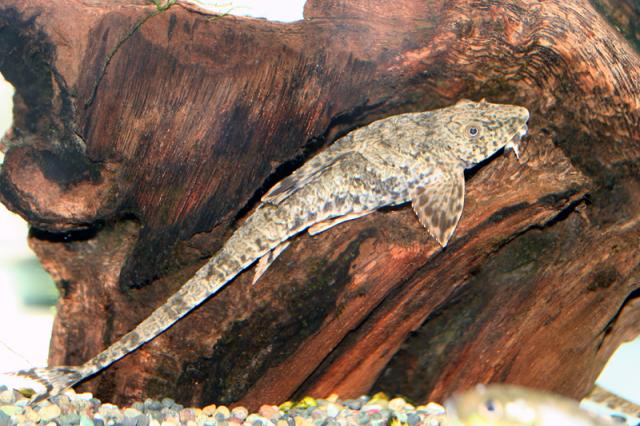
- Rineloricaria eigenmanni

Scientific classification
- Kingdom: Animalia
- Phylum: Chordata
- Class: Actinopterygii
- Order: Siluriformes
- Family: Loricariidae
- Subfamily: Loricariinae
- Genus: Rineloricaria; Bleeker, 1862

Type species
- Loricaria lima Kner, 1853

Synonyms
- Hemiloricaria Bleeker, 1862; Ixinandria Isbrücker & Nijssen, 1979; Leliella Isbrücker 2001; Fonchiiichthys Isbrücker & Michels, 2001

= Rineloricaria =

Genus of fishes

Rineloricaria is a genus of freshwater ray-finned fishes belonging to the family Loricariidae, the suckermouth armored catfishes, and the subfamily Loricariinae, the mailed catfishes. This genus is one of the most speciose genus of mailed catfishes. The catfishes in this genus are found in rivers southern Central America and northern and central South America. Species from this genus are found in the aquarium trade.

== Taxonomy ==
Rineloricaria was first proposed as a monospecific genus in 1862 by the Dutch physician, herpetologist and ichthyologist Pieter Bleeker with Loricaria lima designated as its type species, as well as being the only species then included. Loricaria lima was first formally described in 1853 by Rudolf Kner with its type locality given as Brazil. The genus is included in the subfamily Loricariinae of the family Loricariidae within the suborder Loricarioidei of the catfish order Siluriformes.

Hemiloricaria, Ixinandria, Fonchiiichthys, and Leliella been variably considered synonyms of Rineloricaria; these genera were erected to account for differences in sexually dimorphic traits. However, the traits used to diagnose these genera have been thought to be insufficient. Overall this taxon is one of the least resolved Loricariid genera.

== Species ==
Rineloricaria contains the following valid species:

- Rineloricaria aequalicuspis Reis & A. R. Cardoso, 2001
- Rineloricaria altipinnis (Breder, 1925)
- Rineloricaria anhaguapitan Ghazzi, 2008
- Rineloricaria anitae Ghazzi, 2008
- Rineloricaria atratoensis Castellanos-Mejía, Londoño-Burbano, Ochoa, García-Alzate & DoNascimiento, 2024
- Rineloricaria aurata (Knaack, 2003)
- Rineloricaria baliola M. S. Rodriguez & Reis, 2008
- Rineloricaria beni (Pearson, 1924)
- Rineloricaria buckupi Mejia, Ferraro & Souto-Santos, 2025
- Rineloricaria cacerensis (A. Miranda-Ribeiro, 1912)
- Rineloricaria cachivera Urbano-Bonilla, Londoño-Burbano & Carvalho, 2023
- Rineloricaria cadeae (R. F. Hensel, 1868)
- Rineloricaria capitonia Ghazzi, 2008
- Rineloricaria caracasensis (Bleeker, 1862)
- Rineloricaria castroi Isbrücker & Nijssen, 1984
- Rineloricaria catamarcensis (C. Berg, 1895)
- Rineloricaria cubataonis (Steindachner, 1907)
- Rineloricaria daraha Rapp Py-Daniel & Fichberg, 2008
- Rineloricaria eigenmanni (Pellegrin, 1908)
- Rineloricaria fallax (Steindachner, 1915)
- Rineloricaria felipponei (Fowler, 1943)
- Rineloricaria formosa Isbrücker & Nijssen, 1979
- Rineloricaria giua Castellanos-Mejía, Londoño-Burbano, Ochoa, García-Alzate & DoNascimiento, 2024
- Rineloricaria harenae Rodrigues da Cruz, Lima Pereira, Oliveira and Costa Silva. 2026
- Rineloricaria hasemani Isbrücker & Nijssen, 1979
- Rineloricaria henselii (Steindachner, 1907)
- Rineloricaria heteroptera Isbrücker & Nijssen, 1976
- Rineloricaria isaaci M. S. Rodriguez & Miquelarena, 2008
- Rineloricaria jaraguensis (Steindachner, 1909)
- Rineloricaria jubata (Boulenger, 1902)
- Rineloricaria jurupari Londoño-Burbano & Urbano-Bonilla, 2018
- Rineloricaria konopickyi (Steindachner, 1879)
- Rineloricaria kronei (A. Miranda Ribeiro 1911)
- Rineloricaria lanceolata (Günther, 1868)
- Rineloricaria langei Ingenito, Ghazzi, Duboc & Abilhoa, 2008
- Rineloricaria latirostris (Boulenger, 1900)
- Rineloricaria lima (Kner, 1853)
- Rineloricaria longicauda Reis, 1983
- Rineloricaria maacki Ingenito, Ghazzi, Duboc & Abilhoa, 2008
- Rineloricaria magdalenae (Steindachner, 1879)
- Rineloricaria malabarbai Rodriguez & Reis, 2008
- Rineloricaria maquinensis Reis & Cardoso, 2001
- Rineloricaria melini (O. Schindler, 1959)
- Rineloricaria microlepidogaster (Regan, 1904)
- Rineloricaria microlepidota (Steindachner, 1907)
- Rineloricaria misionera Rodriguez & Miquelarena, 2005
- Rineloricaria morrowi Fowler, 1940
- Rineloricaria nigricauda (Regan, 1904)
- Rineloricaria nudipectoris Mejia, Ferraro & Buckup, 2023
- Rineloricaria osvaldoi Fichberg & Chamon, 2008
- Rineloricaria paraibensis Mejia & Buckup, 2024
- Rineloricaria pareiacantha (Fowler 1943)
- Rineloricaria parva (Boulenger, 1895)
- Rineloricaria pentamaculata Langeani & R. B. de Araujo, 1994
- Rineloricaria phoxocephala (C. H. Eigenmann & R. S. Eigenmann, 1889)
- Rineloricaria platyura (J. P. Müller & Troschel, 1849)
- Rineloricaria quadrensis Reis, 1983
- Rineloricaria quilombola Chamon & Fichberg, 2022
- Rineloricaria reisi Ghazzi, 2008
- Rineloricaria rodriquezae Costa-Silva, Oliveira & Silva, 2021
- Rineloricaria rupestris (Schultz, 1944)
- Rineloricaria sanga Ghazzi, 2008
- Rineloricaria setepovos Ghazzi 2008
- Rineloricaria sneiderni (Fowler, 1944)
- Rineloricaria steinbachi (Regan, 1906)
- Rineloricaria steindachneri (Regan 1904)
- Rineloricaria stellata Ghazzi, 2008
- Rineloricaria stewarti (C. H. Eigenmann, 1909)
- Rineloricaria strigilata (R. F. Hensel, 1868)
- Rineloricaria teffeana Steindachner, 1879)
- Rineloricaria thrissoceps (Fowler, 1943)
- Rineloricaria tropeira Ghazzi, 2008
- Rineloricaria uracantha (Kner, 1863)
- Rineloricaria wolfei Fowler, 1940
- Rineloricaria zaina Ghazzi, 2008
- Rineloricaria zawadzkii Silva, Costa & Oliveira, 2022

== Distribution and habitat ==
The genus is widely distributed on nearly the entire subcontinent, from Costa Rica to Argentina, on both slopes of the Andes. Rineloricaria species are found in a large variety of habitats, including large rivers, streams, and lagoons, associated with bottoms consisting of sand or rocks, sometimes found in marginal vegetation. They are also found to tolerate environments with a wide temperature gradient. Rineloricaria have an adaptive capacity enabling many species to exploit the most varied habitats; some species, such as R. strigilata, have been caught in highly polluted bodies of water and represent some of the main components of the ichthyological diversity in such habitats.

== Appearance and anatomy ==
The average length of a Rineloricaria catfish is about 13 cm (5 in) long. The fish are long, slender, have no visible barbels, an erect dorsal fin, a very thin caudal peduncle, and a narrow face. The coloration of the fishes is usually light brown with darker blotches, and have a dark dorsal fin. They are also covered with bony plates and have a sucker disk mouth, as is common with most fish in the family Loricariidae.

== Reproduction ==
Sexual dimorphism includes hypertrophied development of the odontodes along the sides of the head, on the pectoral spines and rays, and predorsal area of mature males. Several species also show hypertrophied development of the odontodes on the entire caudal peduncle. In males, the pectoral fin spine is often thick, short, and curved when compared to the female. Rineloricaria are cavity brooders. Numerous eggs (often more than 100) are laid attached to one another in single layer masses on the cavity floor, and are brooded by males. Rineloricaria exhibit high levels of karyotypic diversity with chromosome numbers ranging from 36 to 70.

== See also ==
- List of freshwater aquarium fish species
