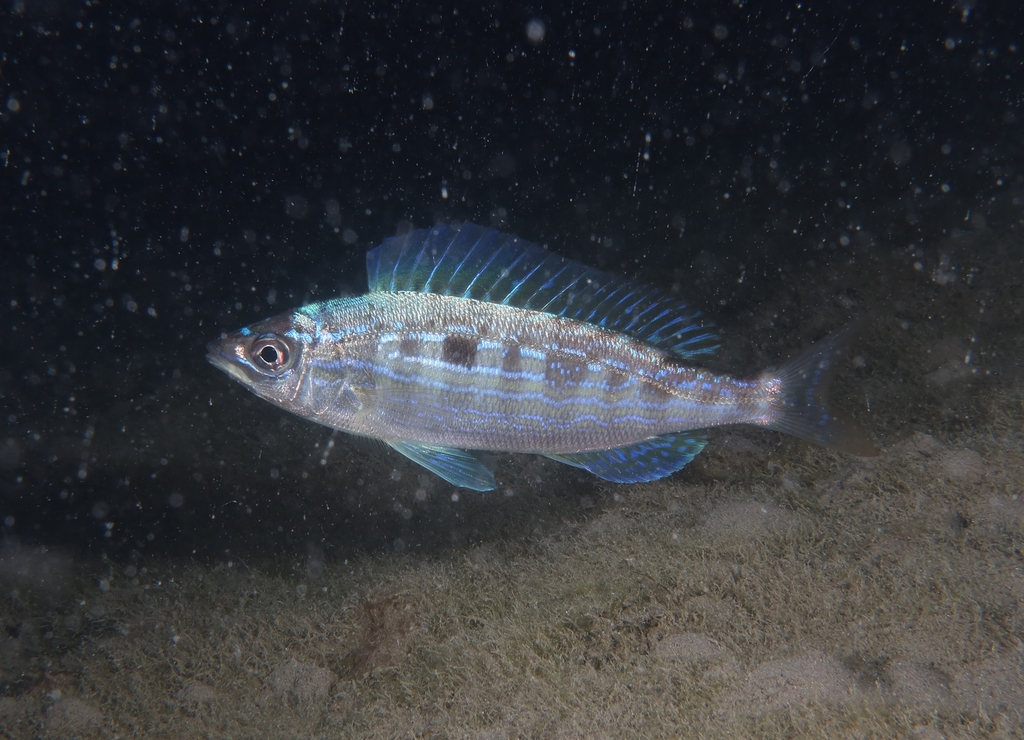
- Spicara flexuosa

Scientific classification
- Kingdom: Animalia
- Phylum: Chordata
- Class: Actinopterygii
- Order: Acanthuriformes
- Family: Sparidae
- Genus: Spicara; Rafinesque, 1810

Type species
- Spicara flexuosa Rafinesque, 1810

Synonyms
- Coleosmaris Norman, 1931; Maena Cuvier, 1829; Marsis Barnard, 1927; Merolepis Rafinesque, 1810; Pterosmaris Fowler, 1925

= Spicara =

Spicara Temporal range: Early Miocene–present

Genus of fishes

Spicara is a genus of ray-finned fish belonging to the family Sparidae, which includes the seabreams and porgies. These fishes are found in the Atlantic and Indian Oceans. The species in the genus are known as picarels.

== Taxonomy ==
Spicara was first proposed as a monospecific genus in 1810 by the French naturalist and polymath Constantine Samuel Rafinesque when he described Spicara flexuosa as a new species. Rafinesque gave the type locality of S. flexuosa as Sicily. The genera Spicara and Centracanthus were formerly classified within the family Centracanthidae but phylogenetic analyses recovered the family Sparidae as paraphyletic if Spicara was not included within it. The 5th edition of Fishes of the World classifies the picarels in the family Sparidae within the order Spariformes by the 5th edition of Fishes of the World. Some authorities classify this genus in the subfamily Boopsinae, but the 5th edition of Fishes of the World does not recognise subfamilies within the Sparidae.

== Etymology ==
Spicara is a vernacular name for picarels, particularly S. flexuosa in Italy. This is presumed to derive from spica, "a spike", or spicare, meaning "in the form of or furnished with a spike", Rafinesque did not explain why he chose this name.

== Species ==
There are currently eight recognized species in this genus:

- Spicara alta (Osório, 1917) (Bigeye picarel)
- Spicara australis (Regan, 1921) (Southern picarel)
- Spicara axillare (Boulenger, 1900) (Windtoy)
- Spicara flexuosum (Rafinesque, 1810)
- Spicara maena (Linnaeus, 1758) (Blotched picarel)
- Spicara martinicus (Valenciennes, 1830)
- Spicara melanurus Valenciennes, 1830) (Blackspot picarel)
- Spicara nigricauda (Norman, 1931) (Blacktail picarel)
- Spicara smaris (Linnaeus, 1758) (Picarel)

The following fossil species are also known:

- †Spicara dionysii Arambourg, 1927 - Late Miocene of Algeria
- †Spicara islamdagica (Prokofiev, 2001) - Early Miocene of Azerbaijan

The former species Spicara fundata Bannikov, 1990 from the Middle Miocene of Moldova is now placed in its own genus, †Naslavcea. Potential earlier fossils of Spicara are known dating back to the Eocene, but only the form of isolated otoliths.

== Characteristics ==
Spicara picarels have oblong bodies which are deeper than the length of the head. They have a continuous dorsal fin with the bases of the soft rayed parts of both the dorsal and the anal fin are enclosed in a scaly sheath. The largest species in the genus is S. axillaris with a maximum published total length of 38 cm (15 in) while with a maximum published total length of 20 cm (7.9 in) S. nigricauda is the smallest species.

== Distribution ==
Spicara picarels are found mainly in the Eastern Atlantic Ocean and the western Indian Ocean. There is one species S. martinicum which is known only from its holotype collected off the island of Martinique in the Caribbean Sea.
