= Piratini River (Uruguay River tributary) =

Location
- Country: Brazil

Physical characteristics
- Source
  - location: Rio Grande do Sul state
- Mouth: Uruguay River
  - coordinates: 28°6′S 55°27′W
- Length: 352 km (219 mi)
- Basin size: 5,621 km^{2} (2,170 sq mi)

The Piratini River is a river of Rio Grande do Sul state in southern Brazil.

== See also ==
- List of rivers of Rio Grande do Sul
