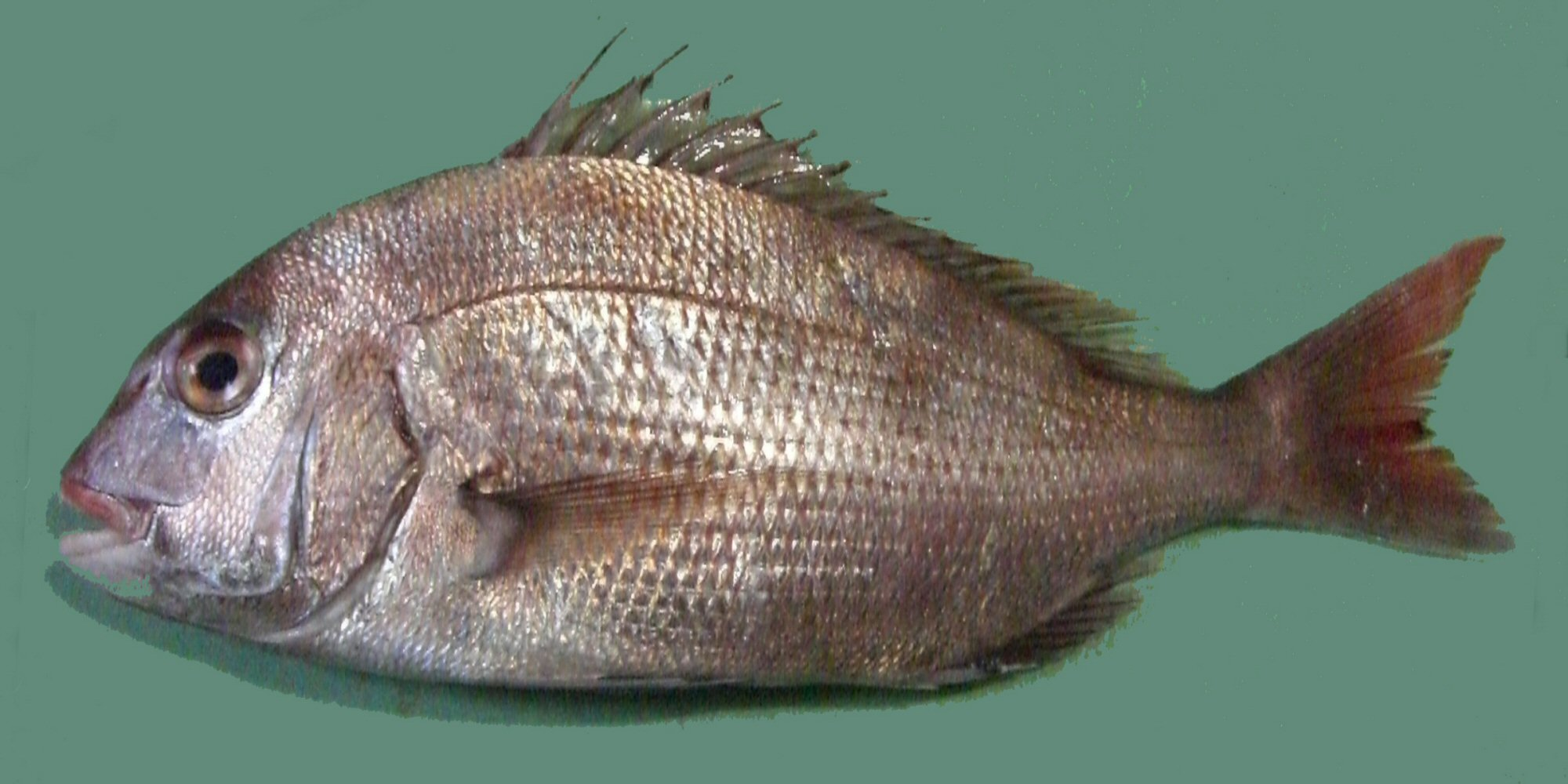

Conservation status
- Least Concern (IUCN 3.1)

Scientific classification
- Kingdom: Animalia
- Phylum: Chordata
- Class: Actinopterygii
- Division: Teleostei
- Order: Acanthuriformes
- Family: Sparidae
- Genus: Pagrus
- Species: P. major

Binomial name
- Pagrus major (Temminck & Schlegel, 1843)

Synonyms
- Chrysophrys major Temminck & Schlegel, 1843; Pagrosomus major (Temminck & Schlegel, 1843); Sparus major (Temminck & Schlegel, 1843); Pagus major (Temminck & Schlegel, 1843)

= Pagrus major =

Species of fish

Pagrus major, the red seabream, red pargo, red porgy or silver seabream, is a species of marine ray-finned fish in the family Sparidae, which includes the seabreams and porgies. This species is found in the Western Pacific Ocean. The fish has high culinary and cultural importance in Japan, and is also frequently eaten in Korea and Taiwan.

== Taxonomy ==
Pagrus major was first formally described as Chrysophrys major in 1843 by the naturalists Coenraad Jacob Temminck and Hermann Schlegel, with its type locality given as "all the bays of Japan". The genus Pagrus is placed in the family Sparidae within the order Spariformes by the 5th edition of Fishes of the World. Some authorities classify this genus in the subfamily Sparinae, but the 5th edition of Fishes of the World does not recognise subfamilies within the Sparidae.

== Etymology ==
Pagrus major has the specific name major, meaning "great". Temminck and Schlegel described this species as the "most common of all the Japanese species of Chrysophrys and the largest in size".

== Physical description ==
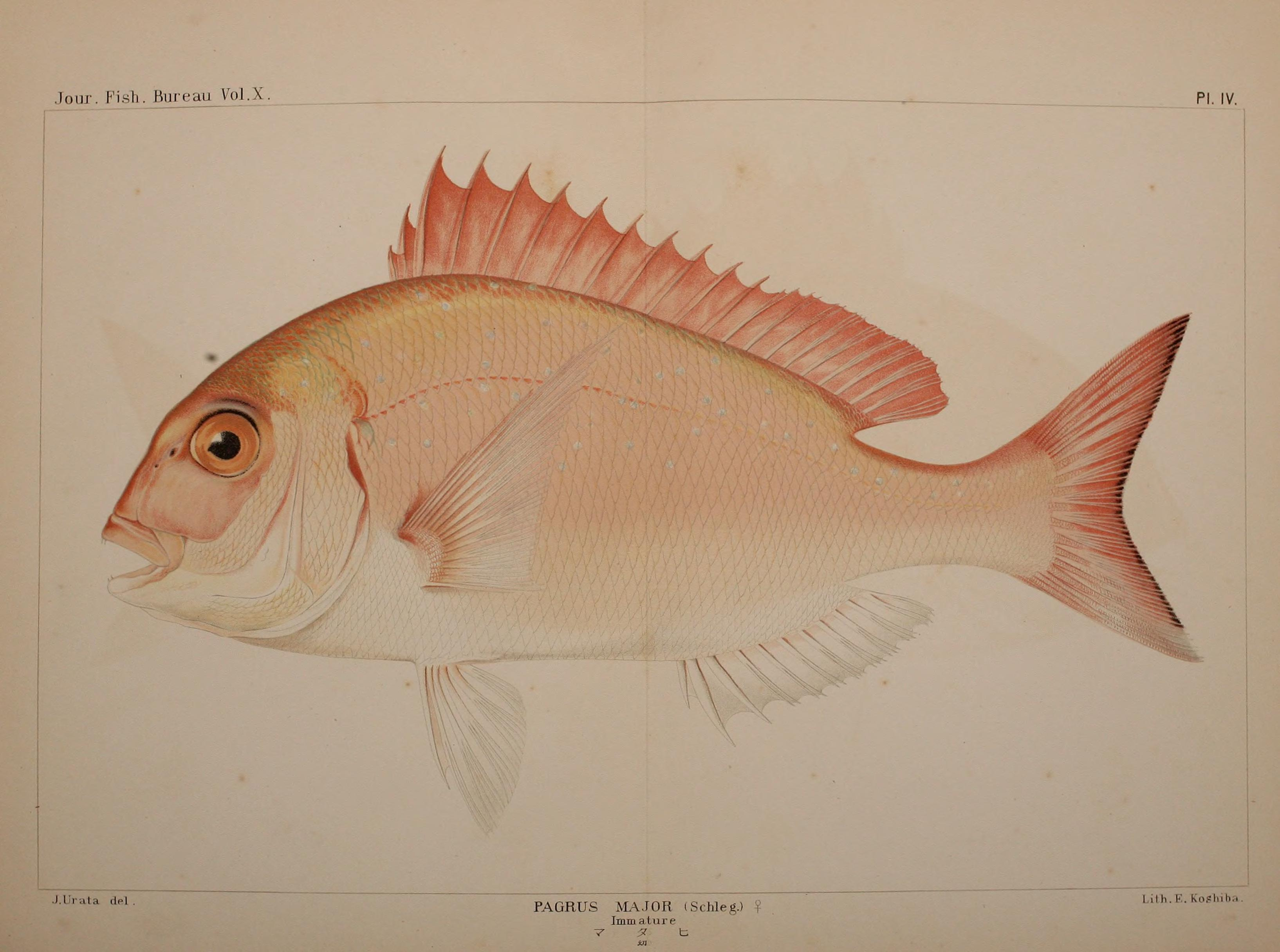
Immature female

Red sea breams are relatively large fish, reaching up to 120 cm in length, although they are usually smaller. In countries where it is eaten, larger specimens are preferred for fishing, but the most commonly consumed fish are between 30 and 70 cm in length. The body is oblong and laterally flattened, with the jaws protruding slightly forward. The pectoral fins are long and slender, reaching nearly half of the total length. The dorsal fin has 12 anterior spines and 10 posterior soft rays, and the anal fin has three spines and eight soft rays. Caudal fins are large and bifid. The mouth has two pairs of sharp fangs on the upper jaw, and three pairs on the lower jaw. There are molars behind the fangs. The scales range from pinkish red to purplish brown, with blue spots across the body. Juveniles have five stripes that disappear upon maturity.

== Range and habitat ==
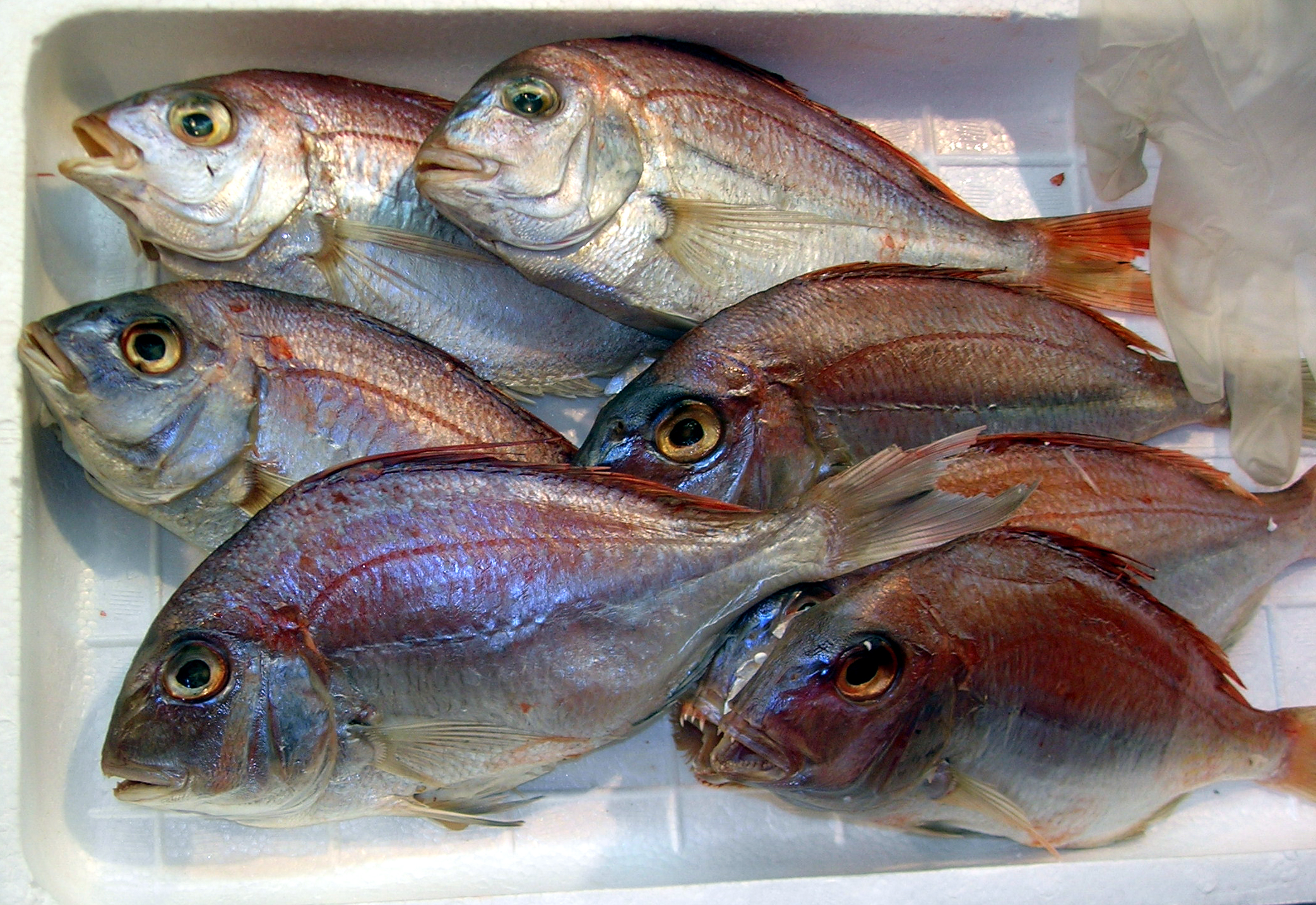
Red seabream (madai) being sold at a market in Ueno, Japan

Red seabream is a marine subtropical oceanodromous demersal fish, found in the Northwest Pacific from the northeastern part of the South China Sea (Philippines excluded) northward to Japan. Adult fish live near the bottom of reefs at 30–200 meters deep, and are often solitary. Juveniles live in shallower waters.

== Feeding ==
Red seabream feeds on a wide variety of prey, which is influenced by individual life stage and seasonal changes. Juveniles will switch from a diet mainly consisting of small prey, such as Anomura and brittle stars, to feeding more on crabs, mantis shrimps, and cephalopods, which are larger and harder to capture. When they are fully grown, other fish will become their potential prey as well. In terms of food composition, cephalopods make up the dominant part throughout the year, with crabs consumed mostly during summer and fall.

== Life cycle ==
Red seabream spawns between February and August, when they swim from deeper waters to shallower areas. Eggs and juveniles float freely in the ocean, and are not protected by parents, which makes them easy prey for larger fish. Habitat preference is genetically coded in juveniles, which helps them to choose the optimal microhabitat in a fluctuating environment. Habitat preference is only observed in juvenile fish up to the age of 30 days, while adult fish do not show any habitat preference. Both adults and juveniles feed on small crustaceans, such as shrimp and crabs, as well as smaller fish and sea urchins.

The fish's average life span is between 20 and 40 years.

== As food ==
In Japan, Pagrus major is known as madai (真鯛 "true sea bream") or simply tai (鯛 "sea bream"). It is prized for its umami flavor and considered a luxury food, often served at festive events such as weddings, and during Japanese New Year. It is also the most commonly eaten fish in Taiwan. In Korea, the fish is called domi (Korean: 도미) or chamdom (Korean: 참돔), and is moderately popular as food.

Red seabream can be broiled, grilled, baked or eaten raw, such as in sashimi.

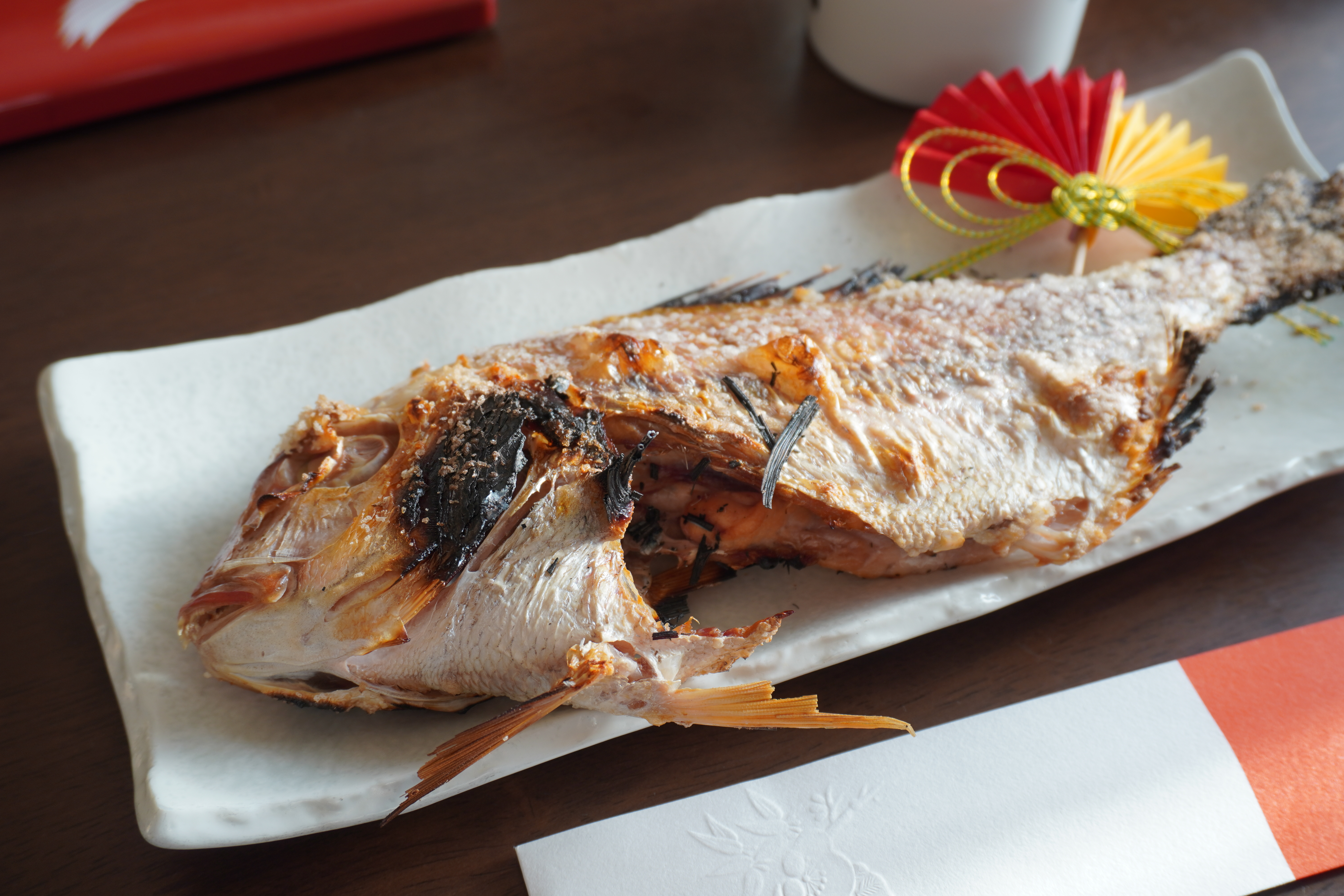
Red seabream prepared for New Year's Day

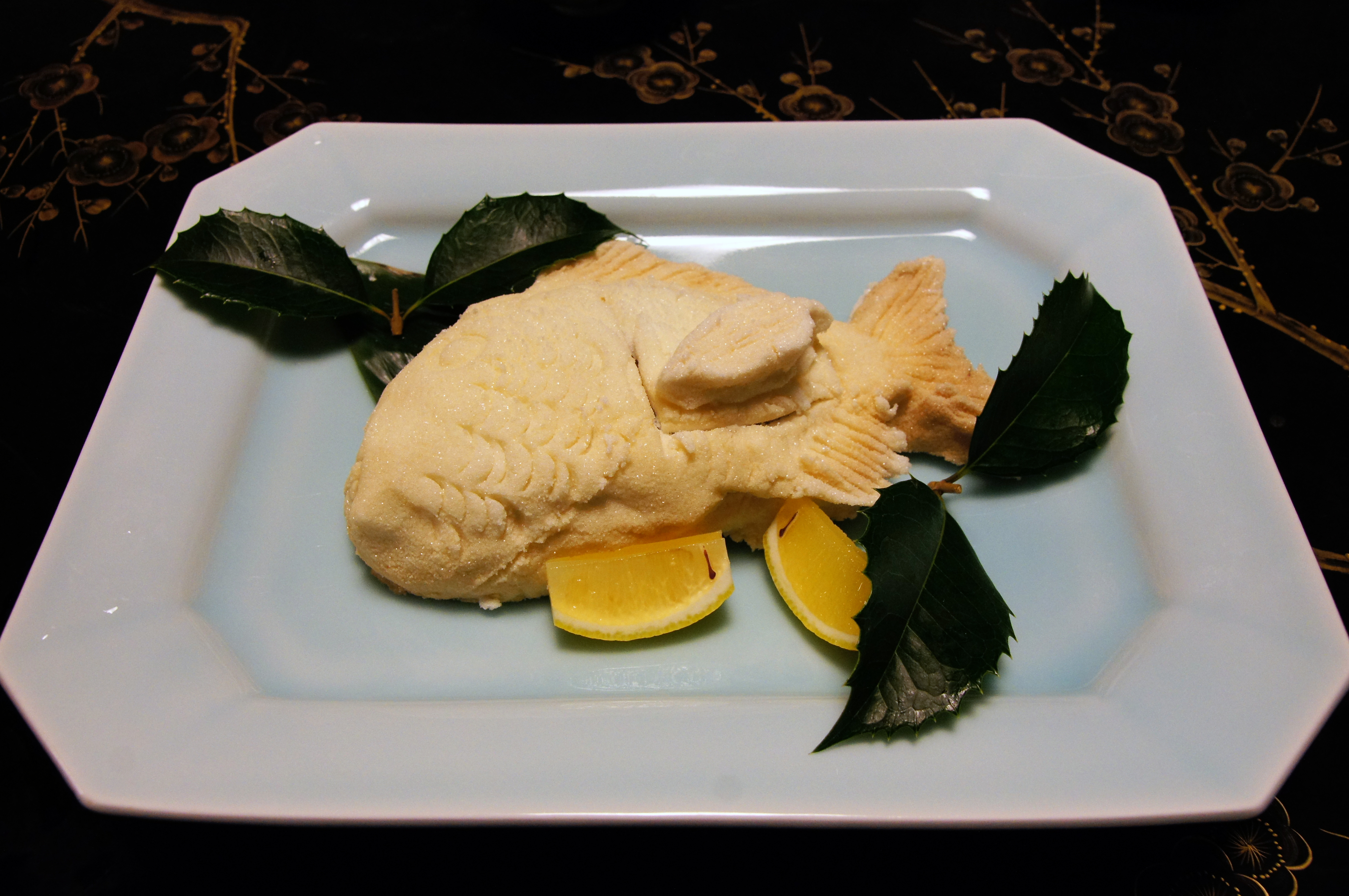
Red seabream baked in a shell of salt

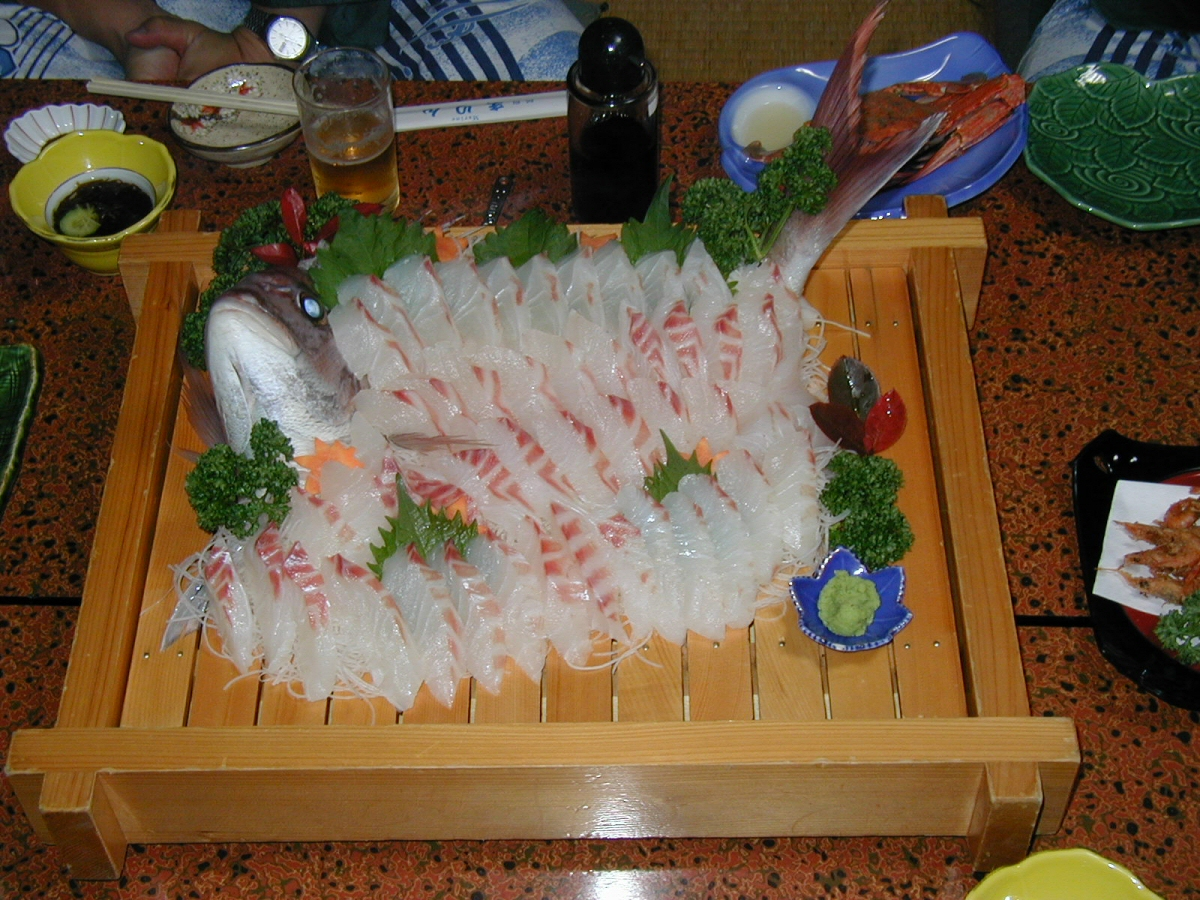
Red seabream sashimi

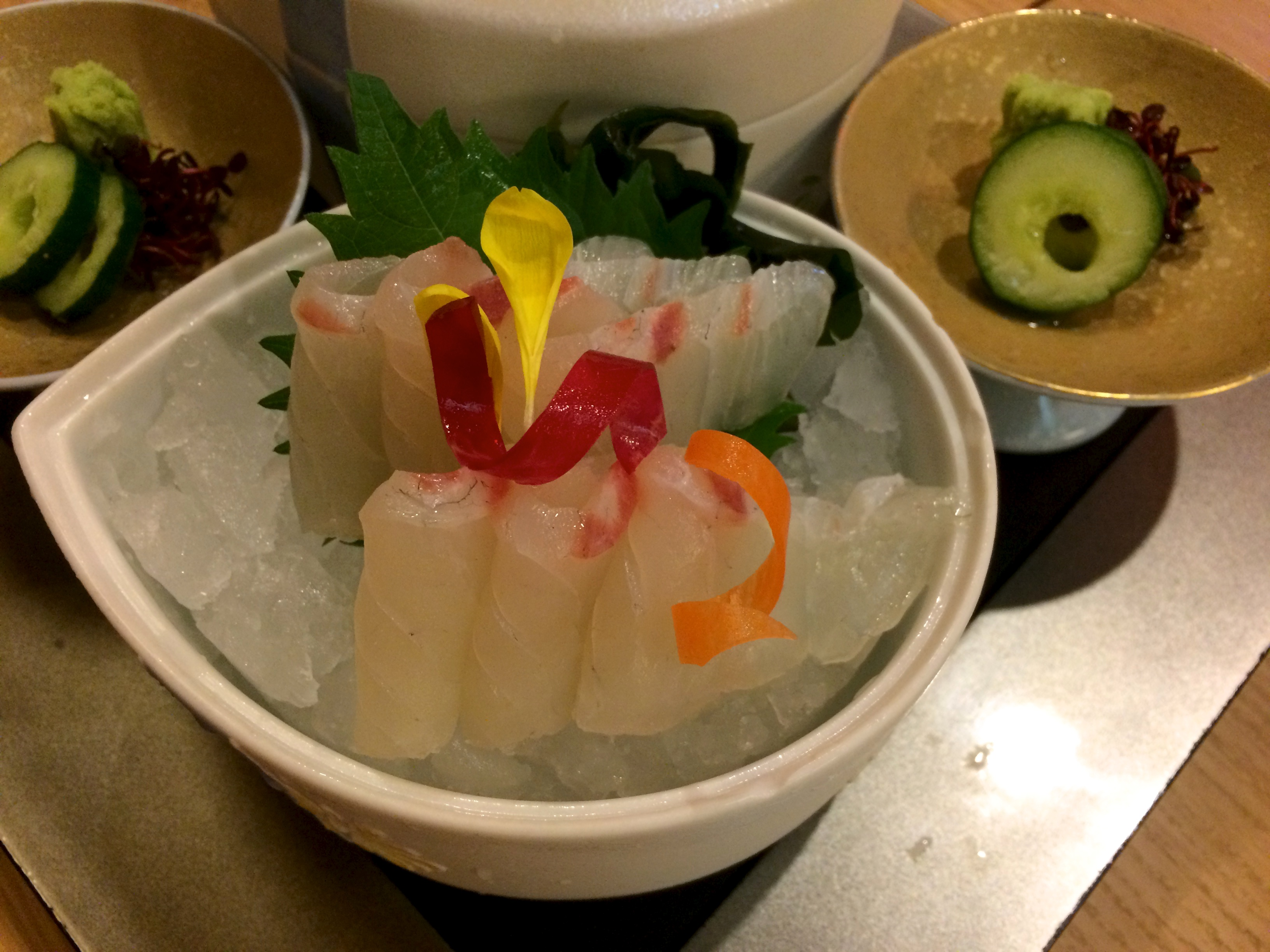
Sashimi

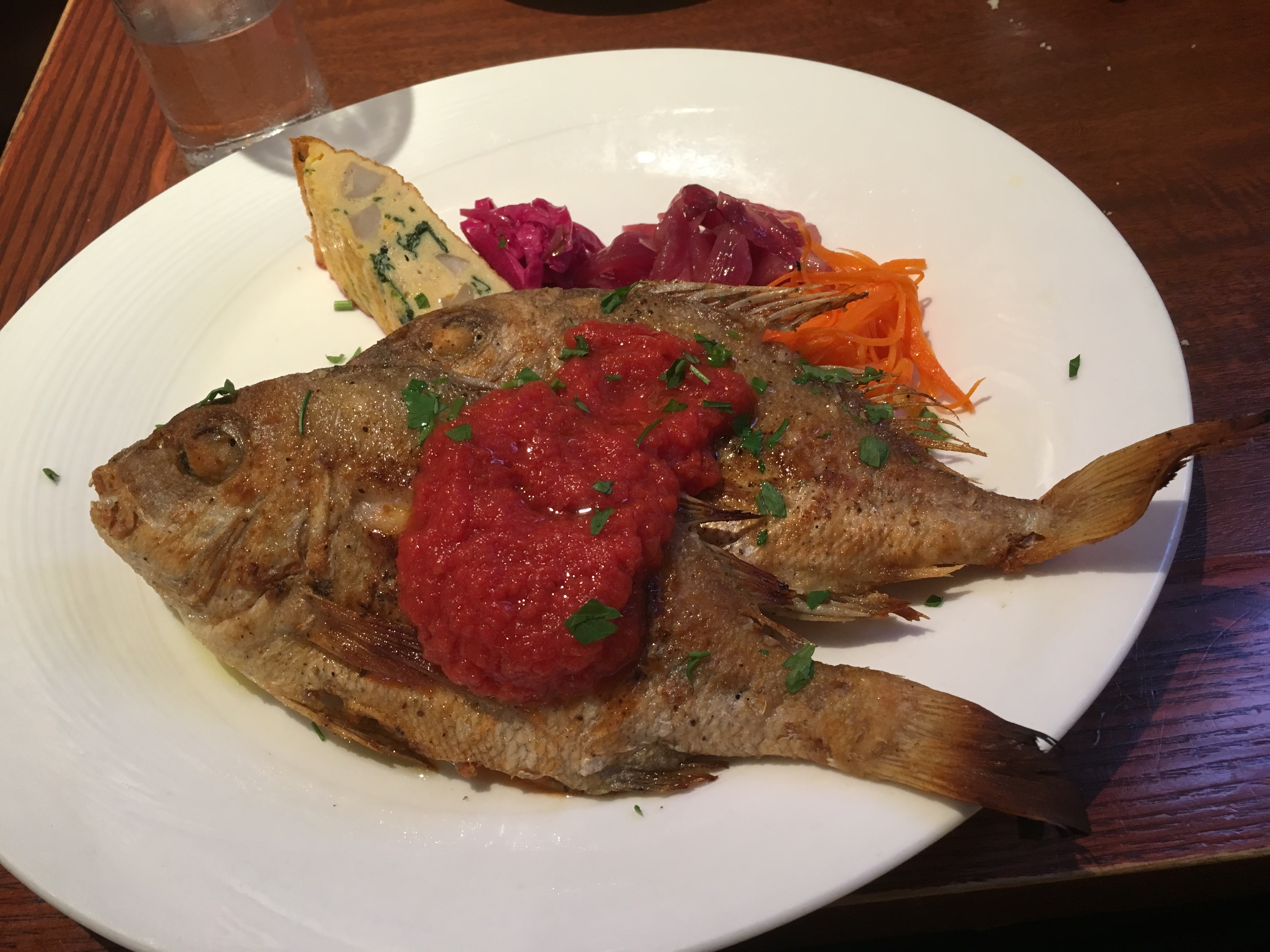
Fried red seabream

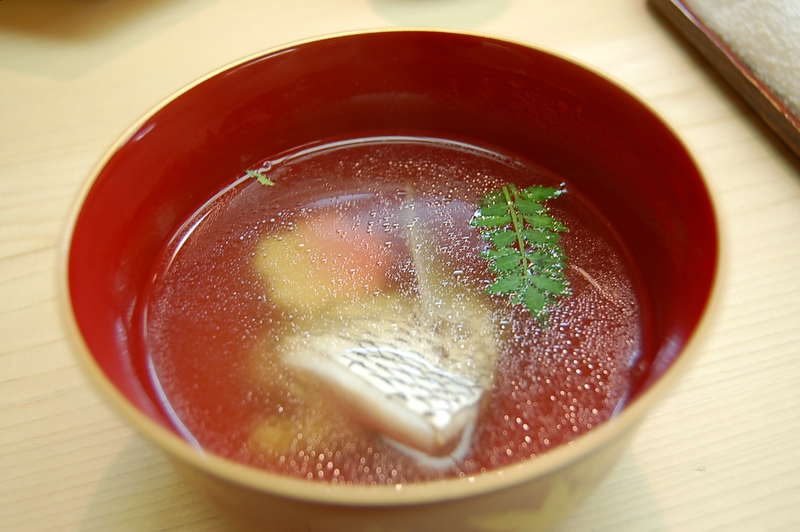
Suimono (clear soup) with red seabream

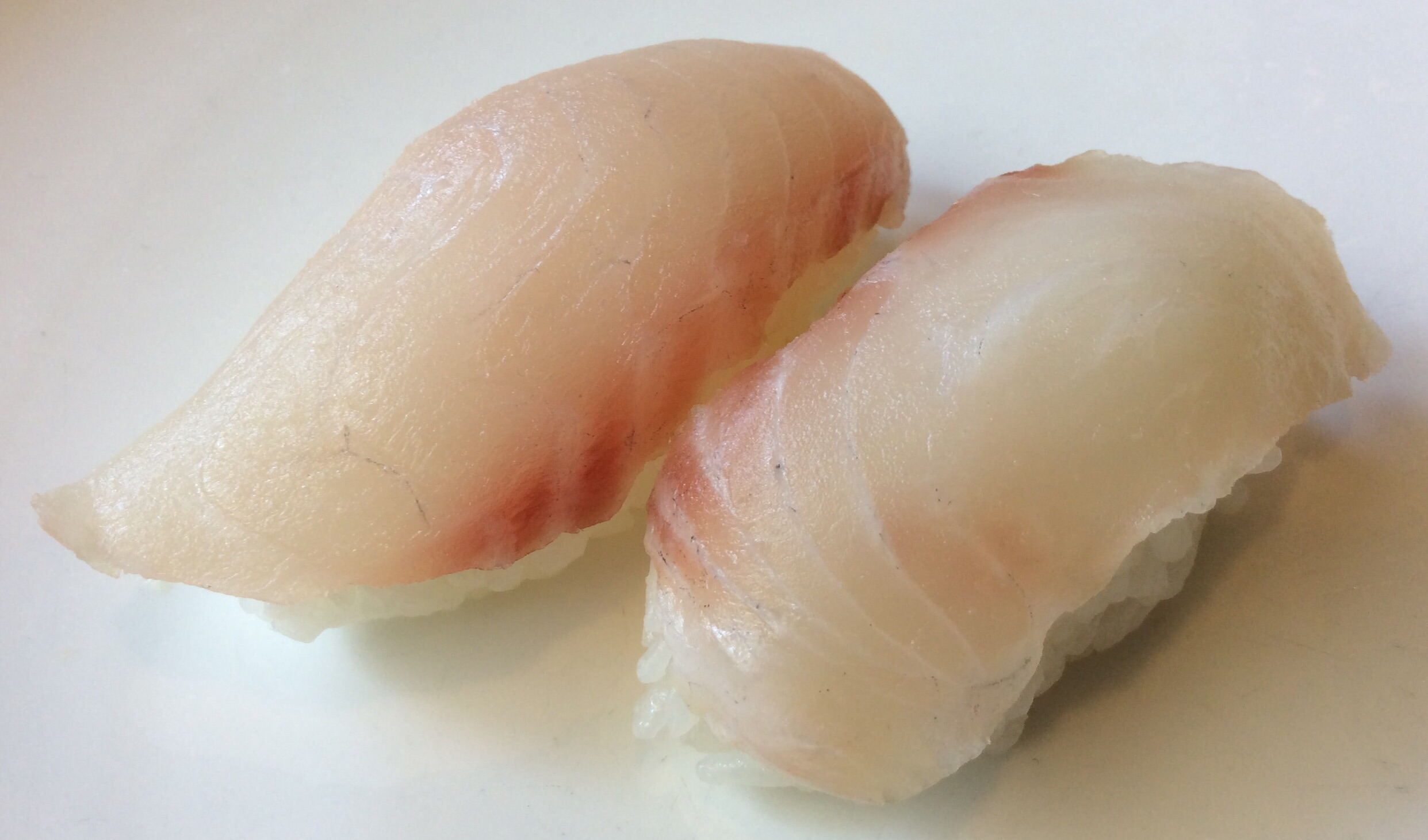
Red seabream sushi

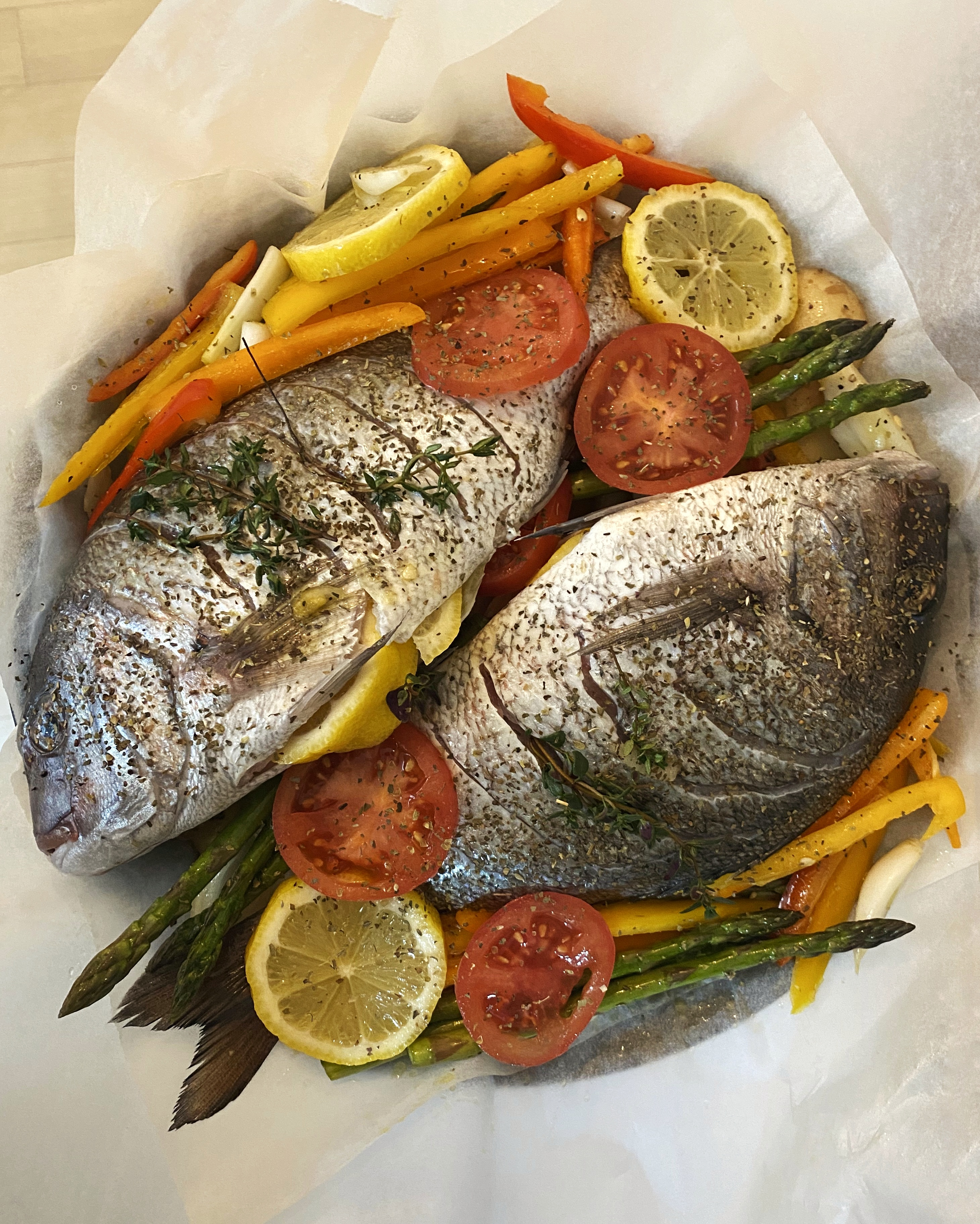
Korean domi-gui before baking

== In culture ==
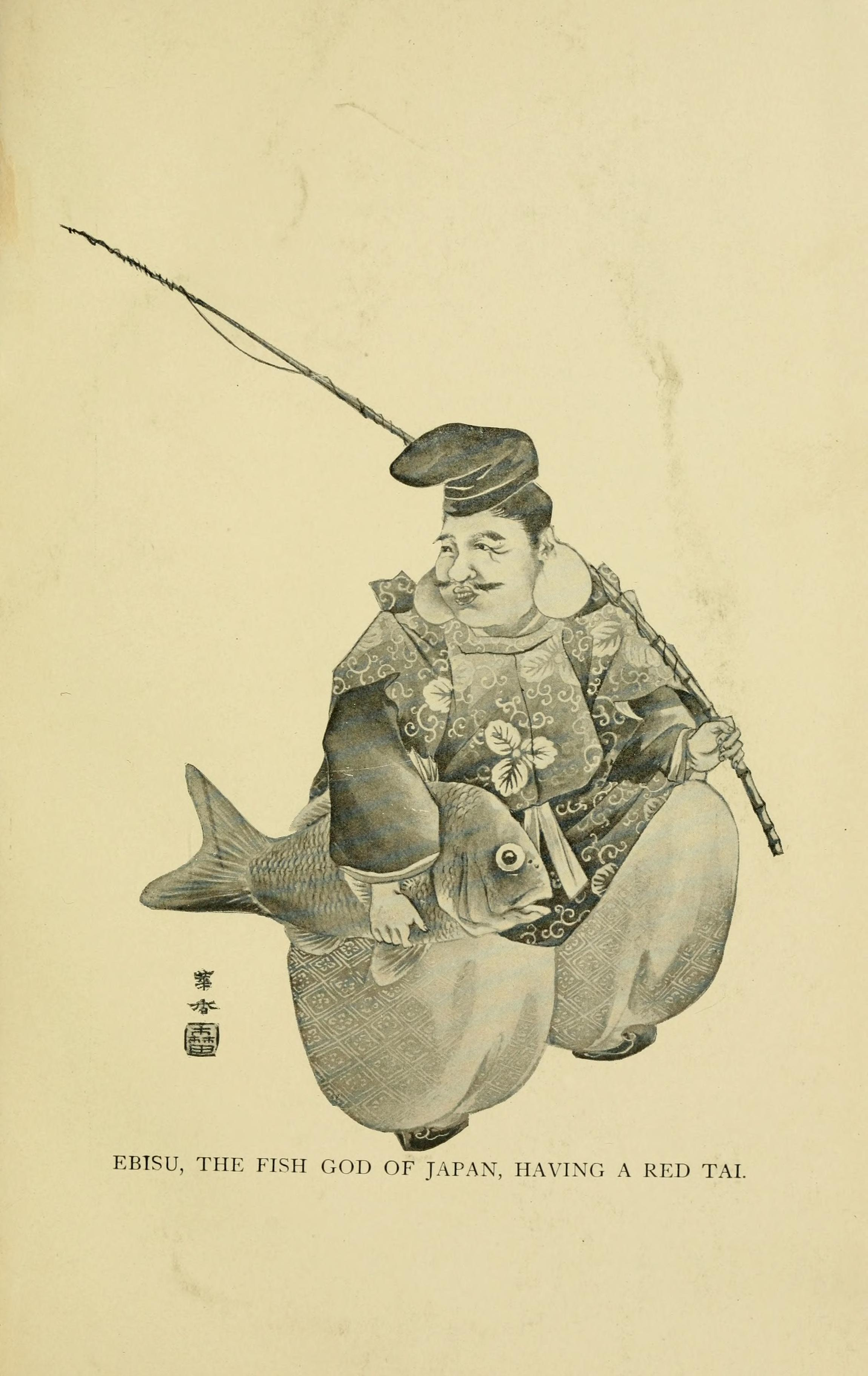
The god Ebisu with a red seabream, from Fish stories alleged and experienced (1909) by C. H. Holder

Pagrus major is important in Japanese culture, where it is associated with good fortune and abundance, and eaten on special occasions. The red scales are considered auspicious, and traditionally believed to ward off evil spirits. Public figures such as politicians or sumo wrestlers are often photographed holding up a red seabream after a victorious event. Ebisu, the god of fortune and fishermen, is often portrayed holding a red seabream.

Due to its prestige, red seabream is sometimes called "The King of Hundred Fishes" (百魚の王) in Japan, where "hundred" is a metaphor for all other fishes.

Several Japanese idioms also reference the red seabream as a precious object:

- Ebi de tai o tsuru (海老で鯛を釣る "To fish a sea bream using a shrimp as bait"): To gain a great profit or achievement with minimal investment.
- Kusatte mo tai (腐っても鯛 "Even if it's rotten, it's still sea bream"): Something of high quality still retains its value even if it becomes degraded.
- Tai no o yori iwashi no atama (鯛の尾より鰯の頭 "Rather than a sea bream's tail, better a sardine's head"): It's better to be the leader of a small group rather than a follower of a large group.

The tai no tai (鯛の鯛 "bream within bream") is a good luck charm consisting of a fish's scapula and coracoid bones, which resemble a red seabream. The bones are interpreted as a "second bream" inside the original bream, which is discovered and collected after the fish's meat is consumed. Tai no tai are traditionally associated with red seabreams, but can come from the bones of any fish.

Taiyaki, a cake filled with azuki bean paste, is famously made in the shape of a red seabream (tai), which its inventor intended as a way to make street food feel luxurious.

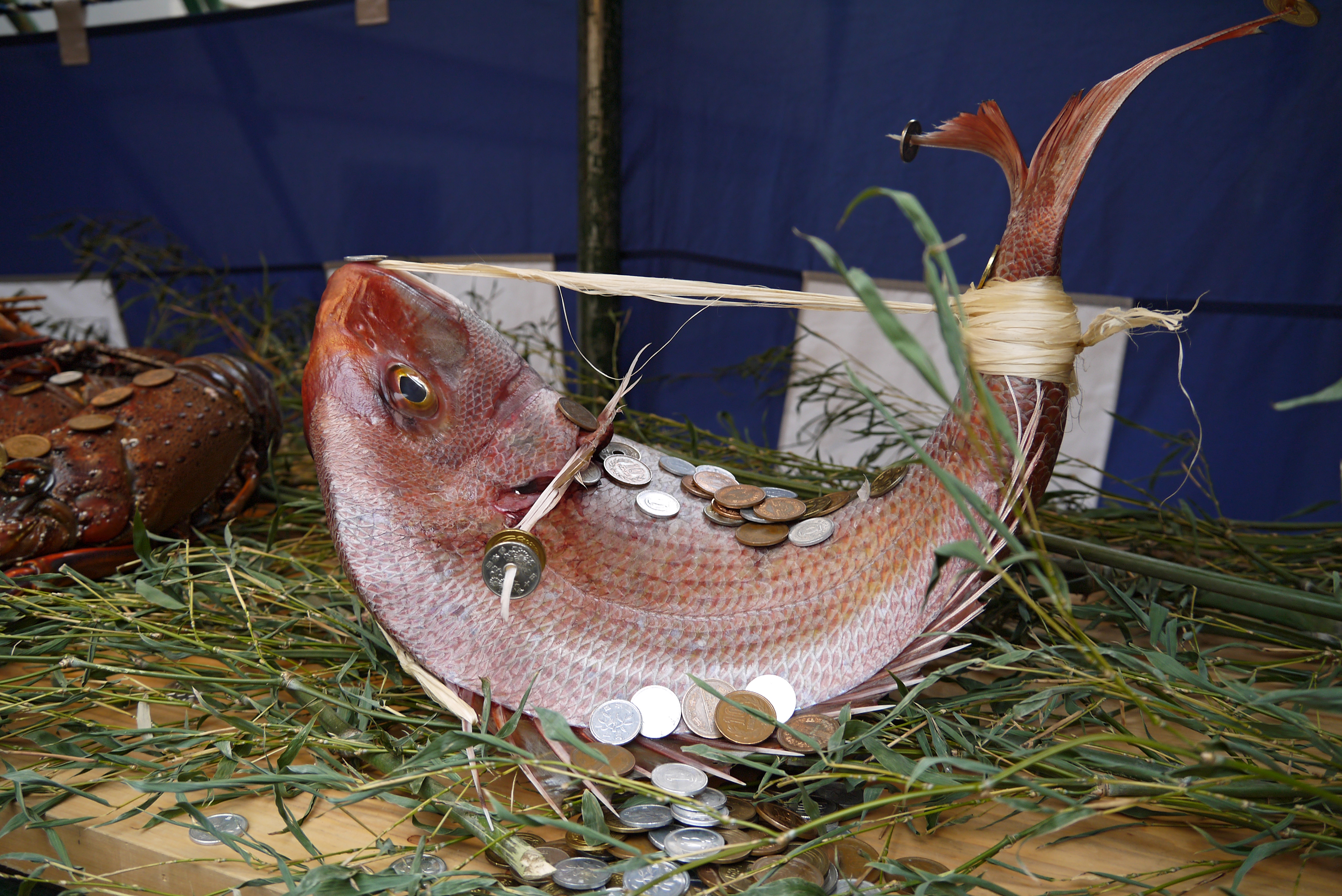
Red seabream as an auspicious object, with straw bindings and coins at Osaka Tenmangū shrine

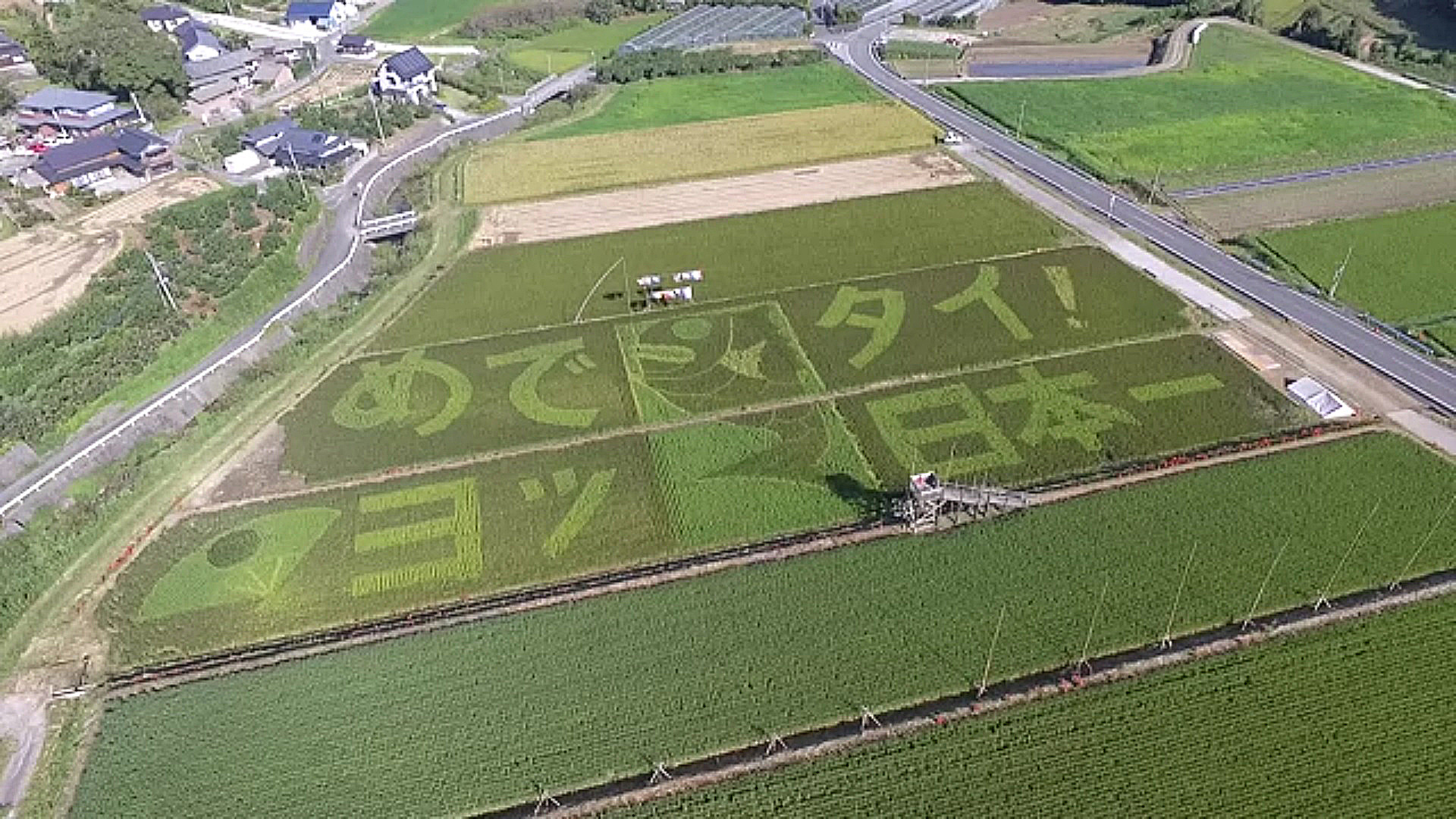
Tambo art depicting a red seabream in a rice paddy in Itoshima, Fukuoka Prefecture

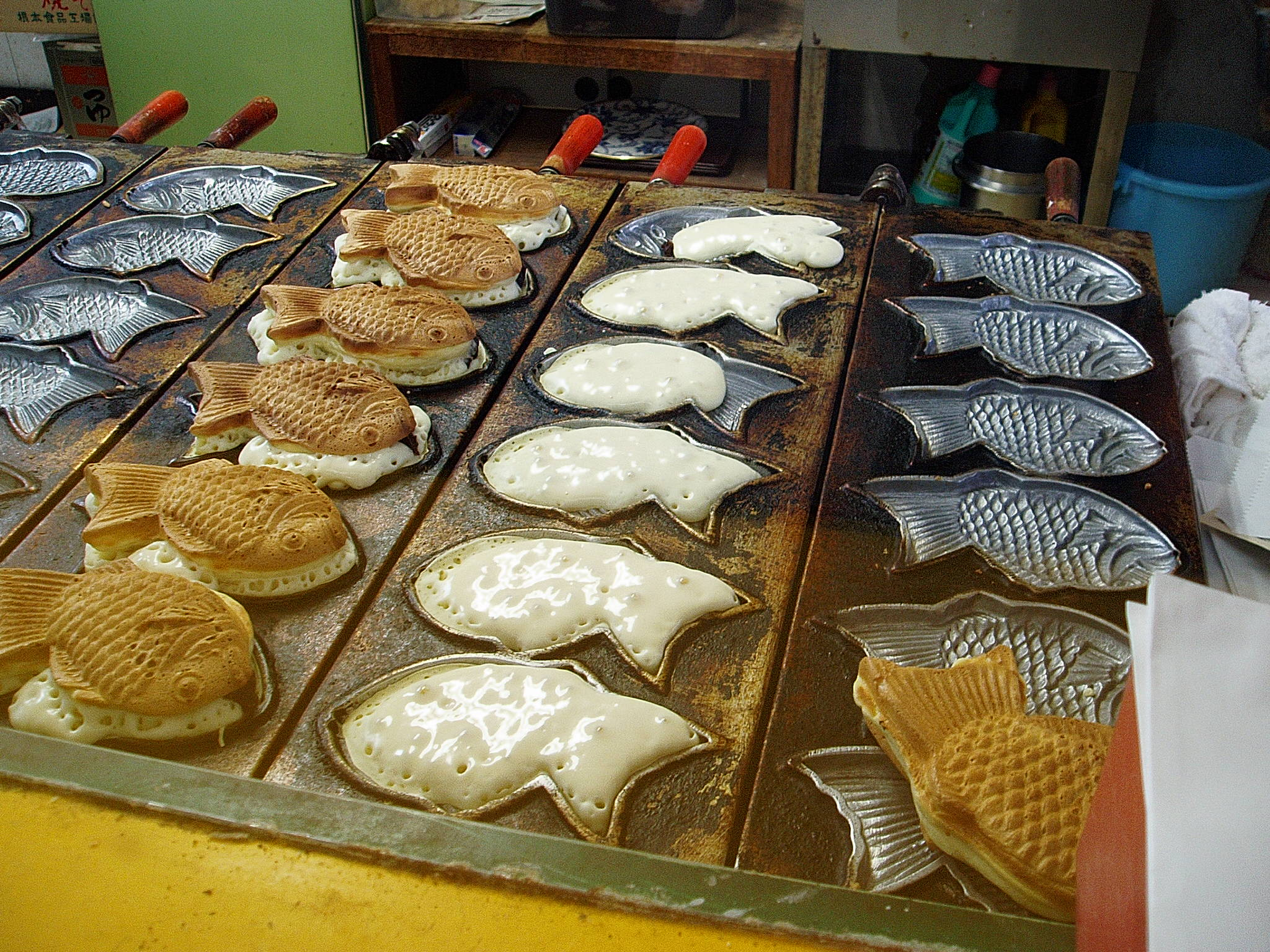
Taiyaki cakes being made in the shape of red seabream (tai)

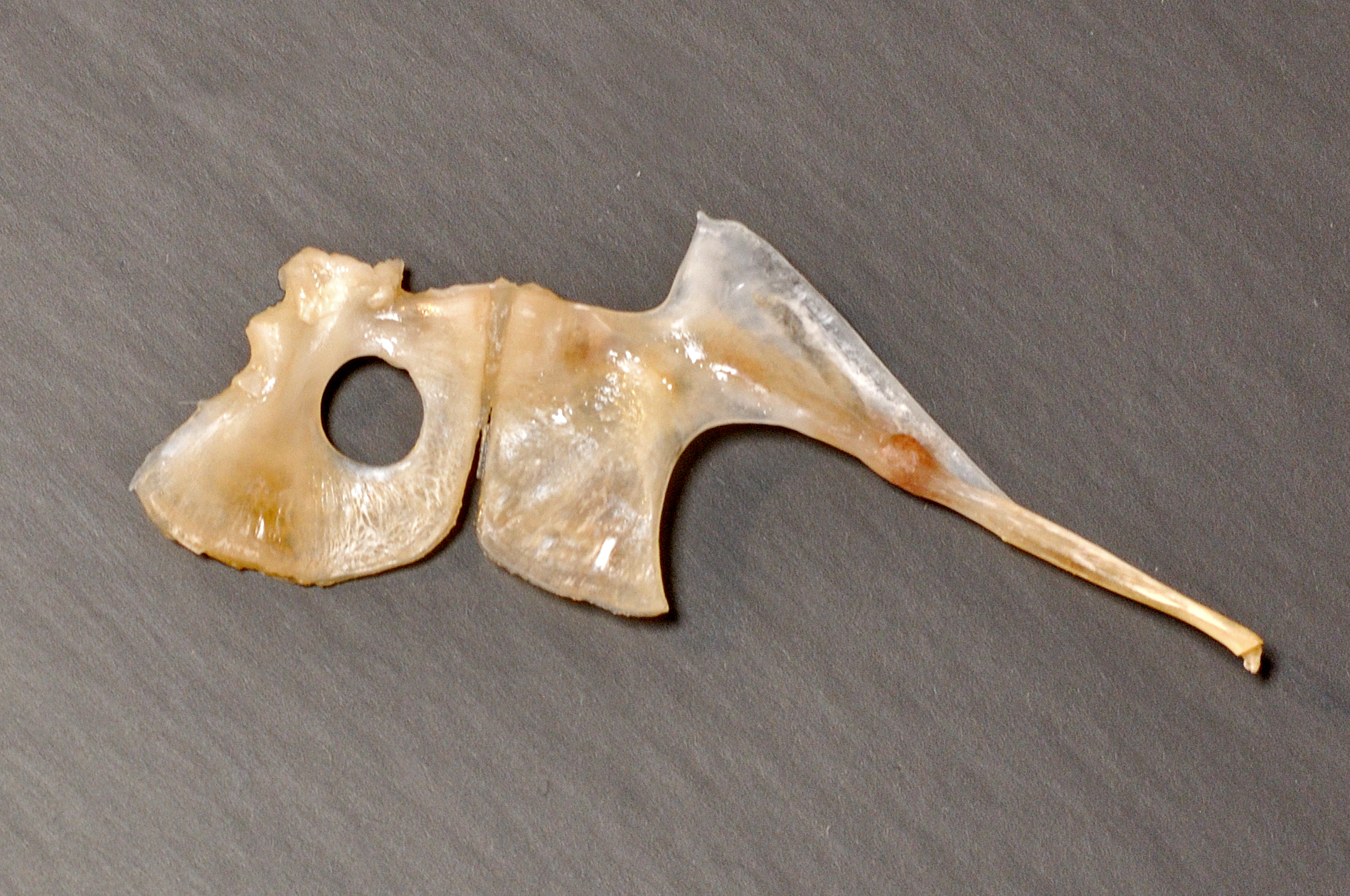
A tai no tai, the bones of a red seabream that resembles a second fish inside the original fish, used as a good luck charm

== In art ==
The red seabream has historically been the subject of paintings, and its shape has also been used in crafts.

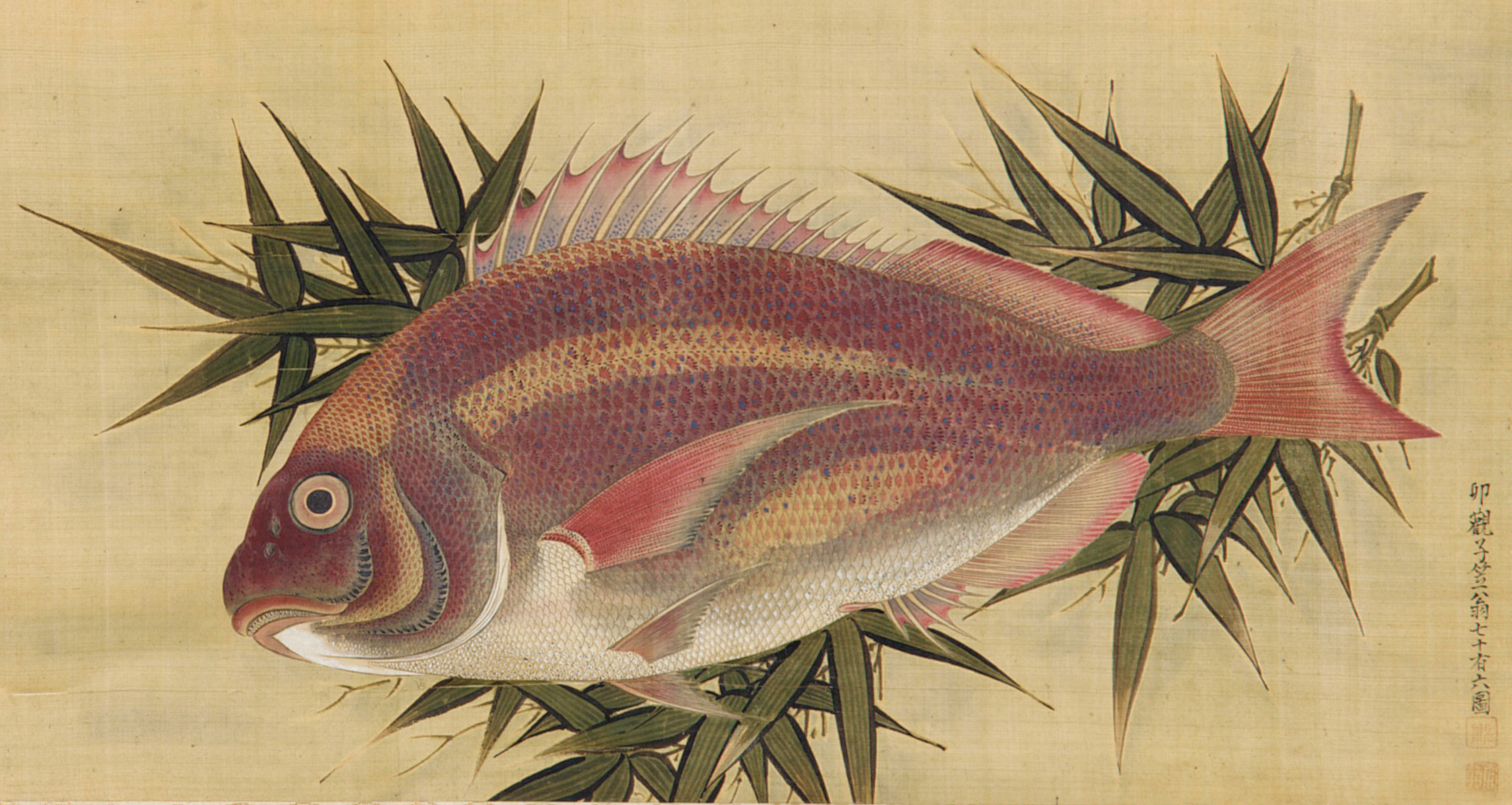
Tai on Bamboo Leaves, painting by Ogawa Haritsu (1663-1747)

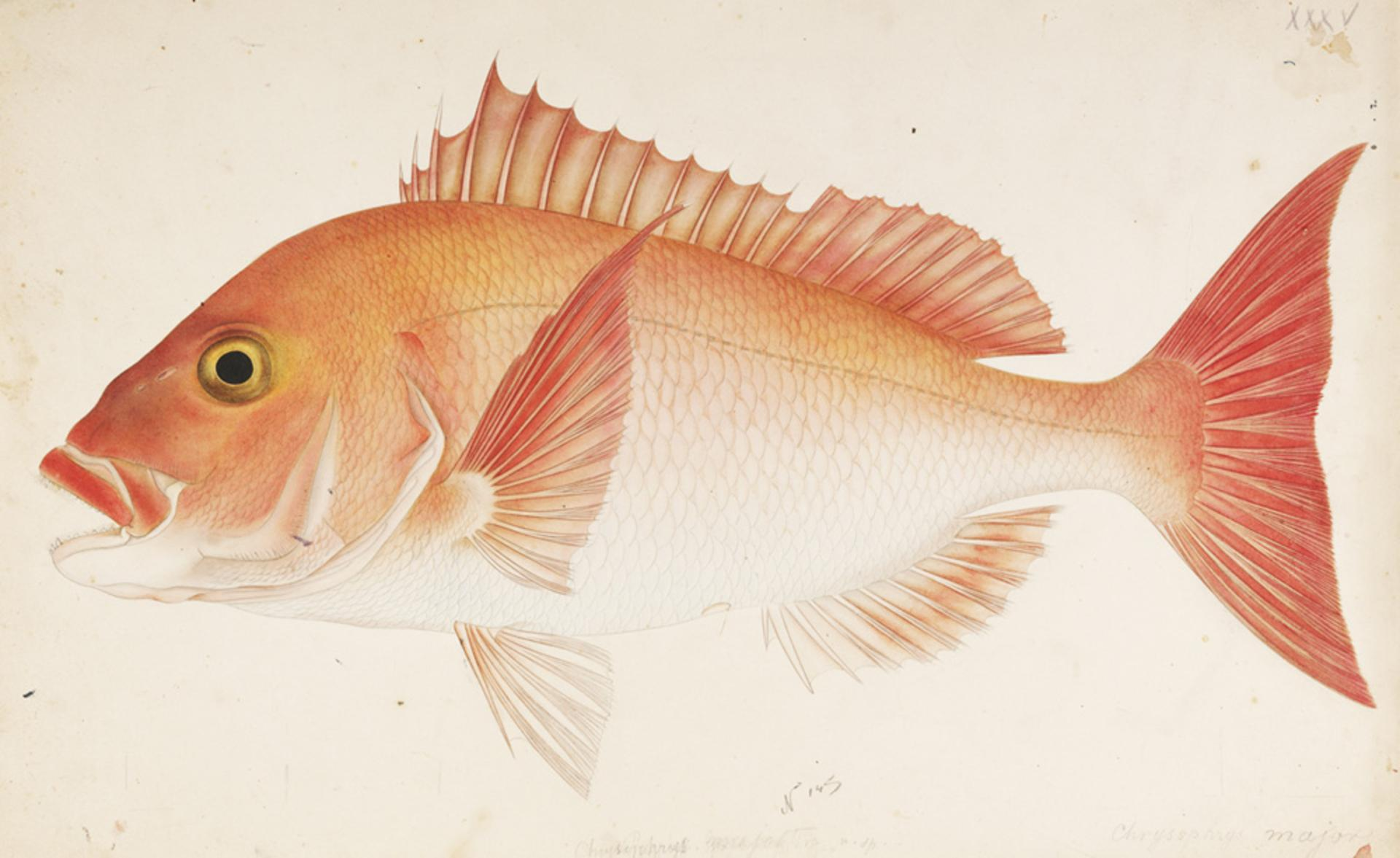
Painting by Kawahara Keiga (1786–1860)

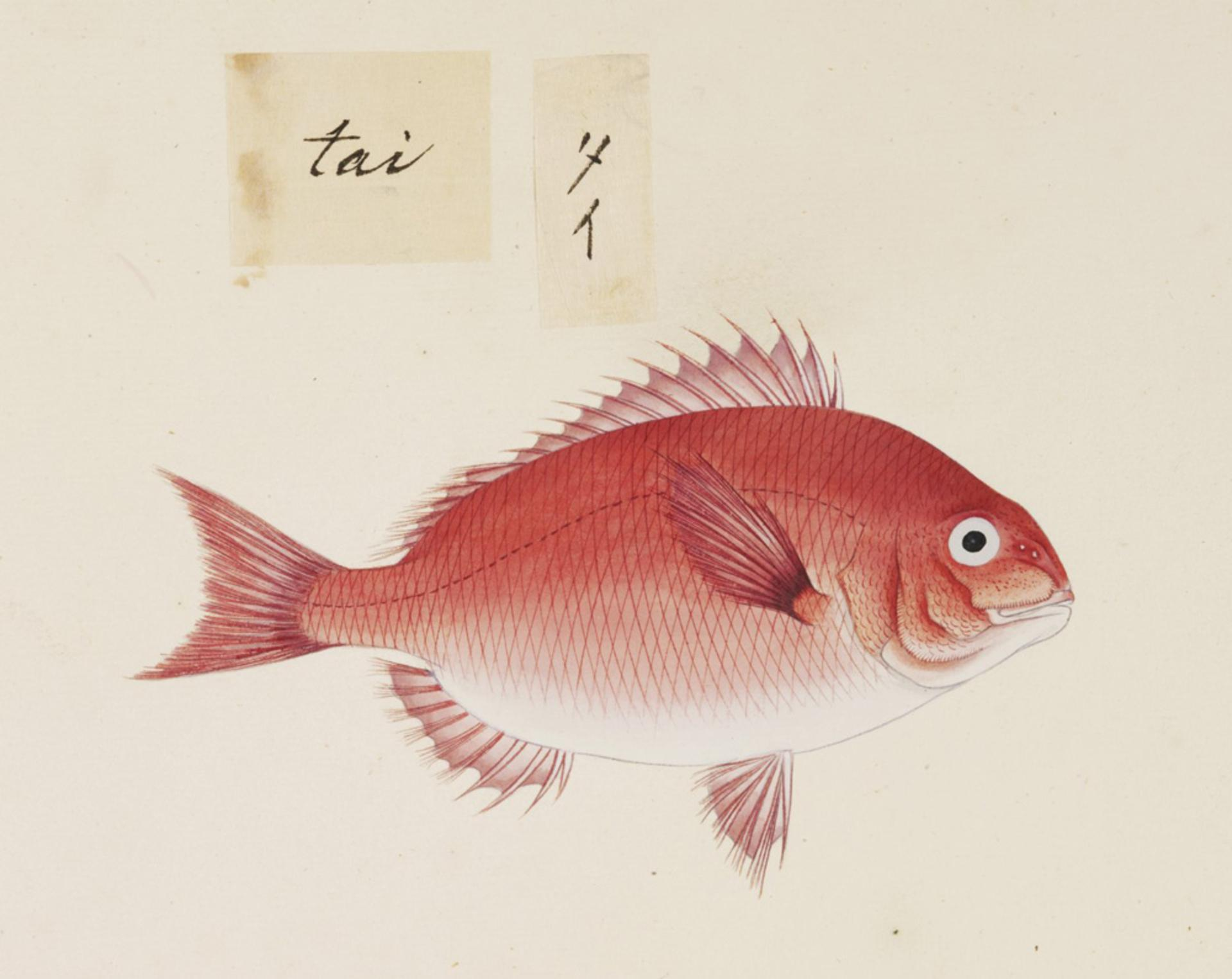
Painting by Kawahara Keiga

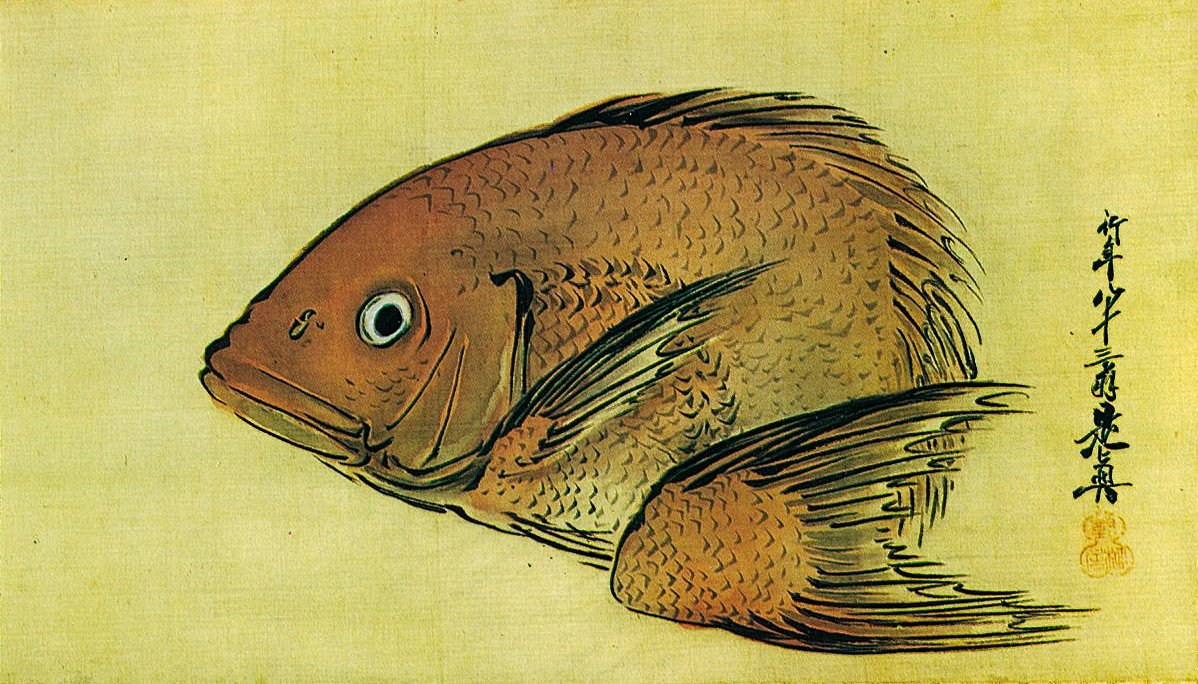
Painting by Shibata Zeshin (1807-1891)

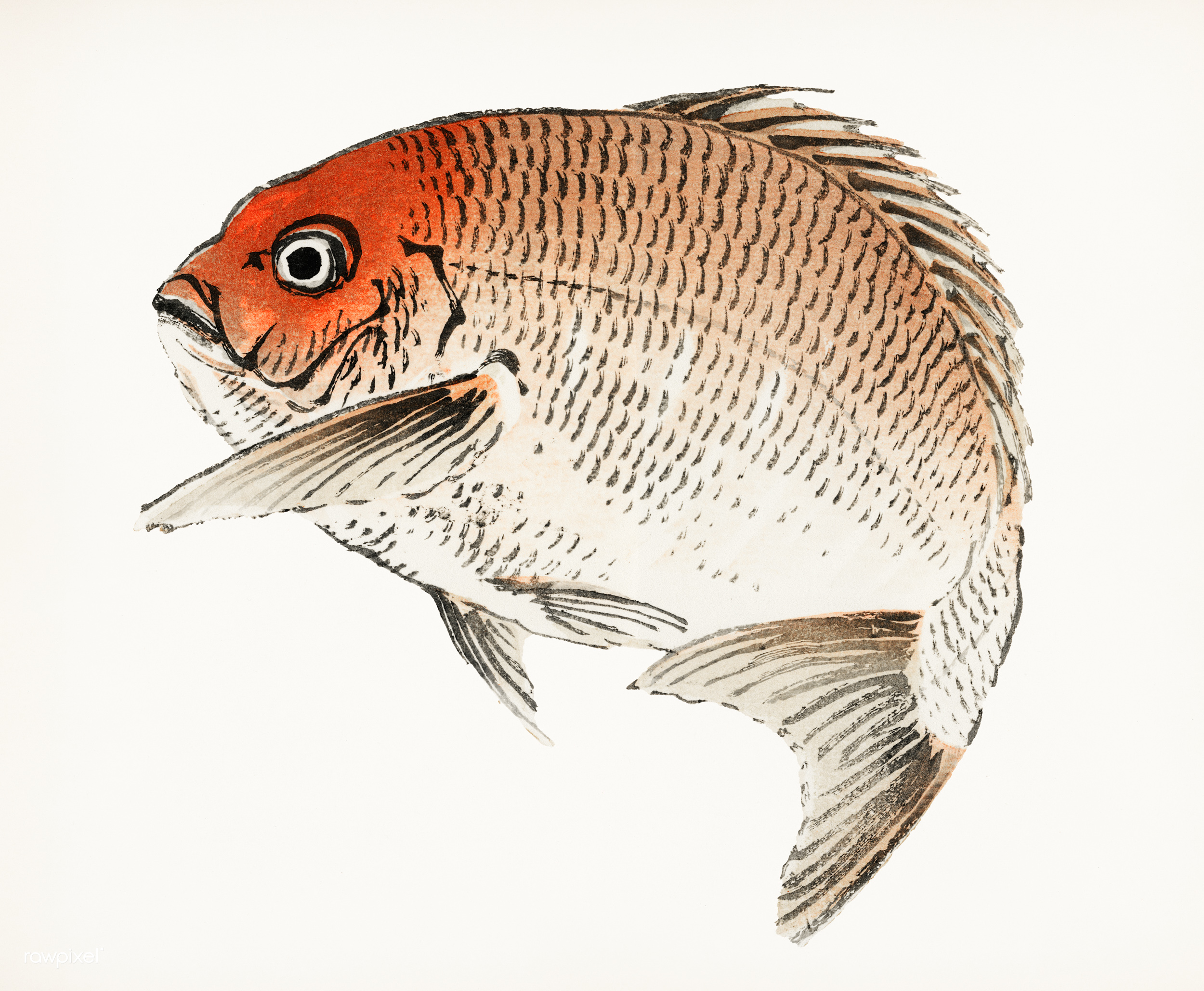
Painting by Kōno Bairei (1844-1895).

== See also ==
- Red porgy
- Taiyaki, a pancake shaped like and named after red seabream
