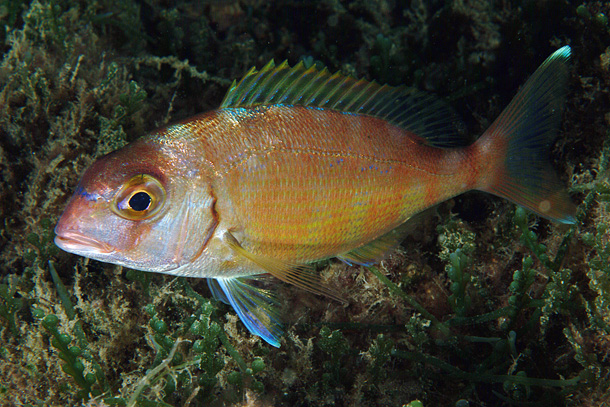
- Pagrus pagrus

Scientific classification
- Kingdom: Animalia
- Phylum: Chordata
- Class: Actinopterygii
- Order: Acanthuriformes
- Family: Sparidae
- Genus: Pagrus; Cuvier, 1816

Type species
- Sparus pagrus Linnaeus, 1758

Synonyms
- Semapagrus Fowler, 1925

= Pagrus =

Pagrus Temporal range: Early Miocene–present

Genus of fishes

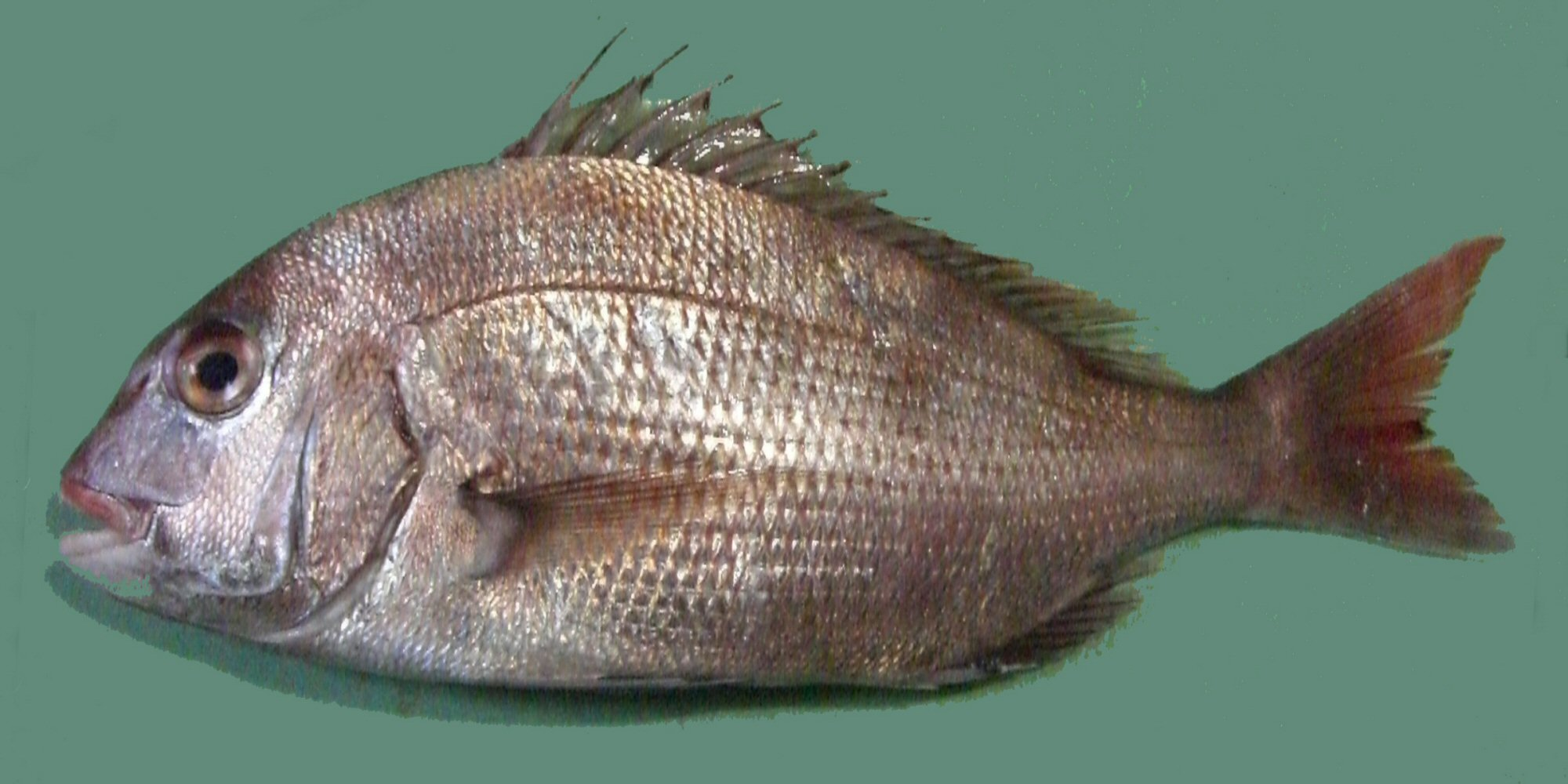
Red seabream (Pagrus major)

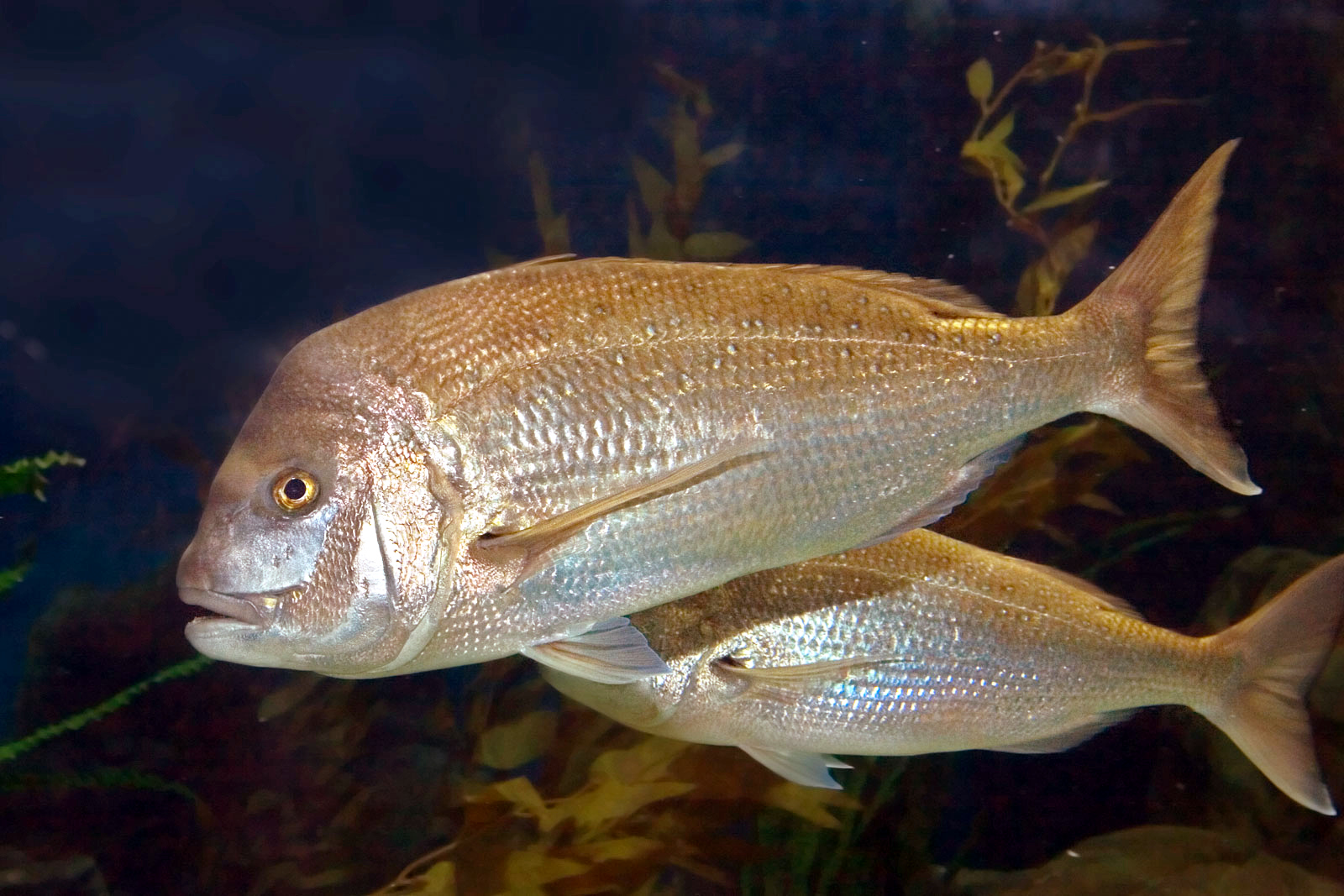
Australasian snapper

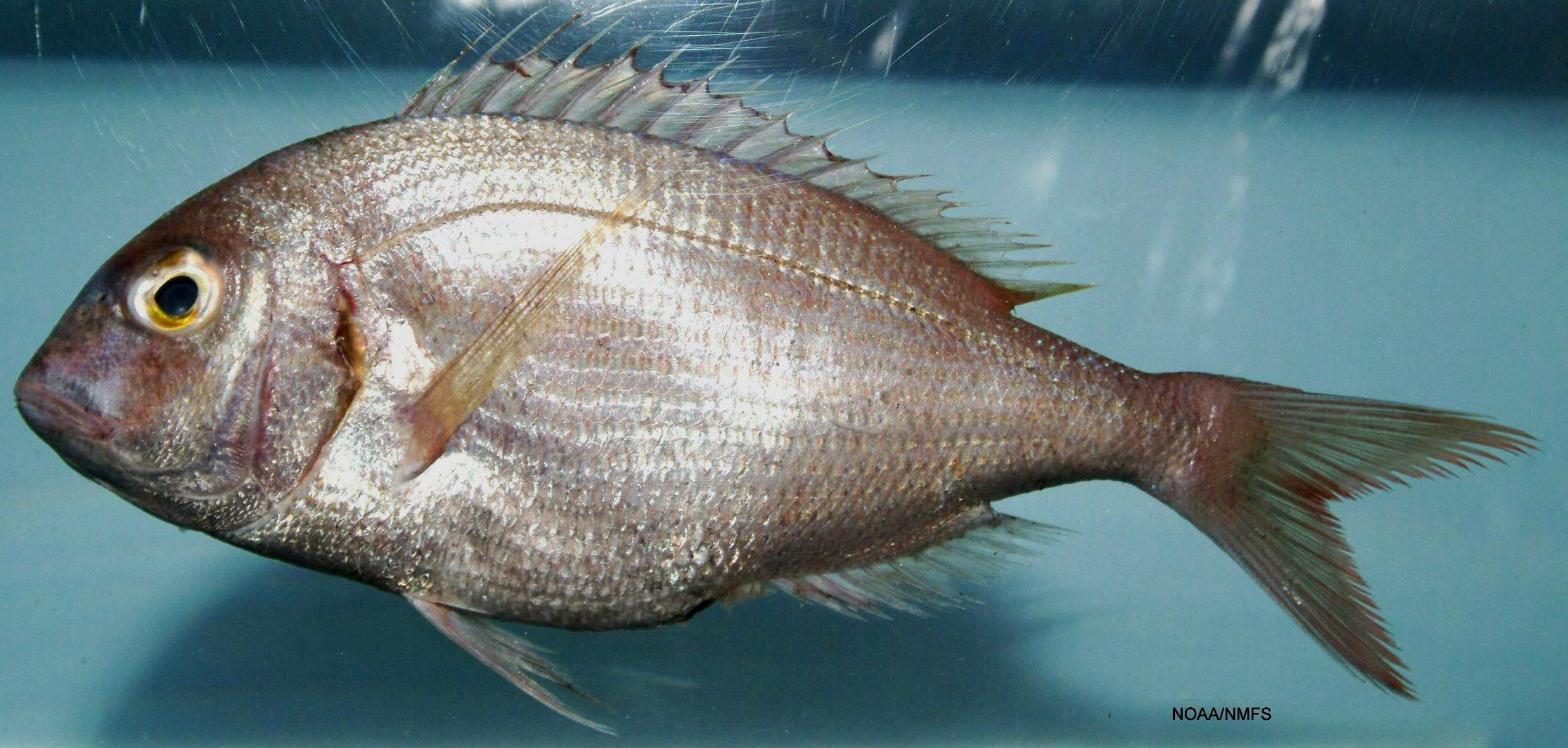
Red porgy

Pagrus is a genus of marine ray-finned fishes belonging to the family Sparidae, which includes the seabreams and porgies. These fishes are found in the Western Pacific Ocean, Atlantic Ocean and Mediterranean Sea. They are esteemed food fishes which are targeted by commercial fisheries and are grown in aquaculture.

== Taxonomy ==
Pagrus was first proposed as a genus in 1816 by the French zoologist Georges Cuvier with Sparus pagrus as its type species by absolute tautonymy, Sparus pagrus was first described by Carl Linnaeus in the 10th edition of Systema Naturae with its type locality given as the Mediterranean Sea of southern Europe. This genus is placed in the family Sparidae within the order Spariformes by the 5th edition of Fishes of the World. Some authorities classify this genus in the subfamily Sparinae, but the 5th edition of Fishes of the World does not recognise subfamilies within the Sparidae.

== Species ==
Pagrus contains at least five described species:

- Pagrus africanus (Akazaki, 1962) (Southern common seabream)
- Pagrus auriga (Valenciennes, 1843) (Redbanded seabream )
- Pagrus caeruleostictus (Valenciennes, 1830) (Bluespotted seabream)
- Pagrus major (Temminck & Schlegel, 1843) (Red seabream )
- Pagrus pagrus (Linnaeus, 1758) (Common seabream or red porgy)

The species Pagrus auratus, formerly placed in this genus, is now placed by Catalog of Fishes in the monospecific genus Chrysophrys Quoy & Gaimard, 1824. This is not followed by FishBase but is accepted by other authorities.

The following fossil species are also known:

- †Pagrus cinctus (Agassiz, 1839) - Early Miocene to Pliocene of Spain, France, Algeria, Libya, Malta, Italy, Slovenia, Slovakia, the Czech Republic, Austria and Ukraine
- †Pagrus hyneus Purdy et al., 2001 - Early Pliocene of North Carolina, US

== Etymology ==
Pagrus is tautonymous from Sparus pagrus, the name pagrus comes from a Greek word for seabreams that dates at least to the time of Aristotle.

== Characteristics ==
Pagrus seabreams are characterised by having oblong, compressed bodies with deep heads which have rounded dorsal profiles. The rear nostril is oblong, the front nostril is a slit. The moderately protrusible mouth is small, horizontal and the end of the maxilla is overlapped by the suborbital bone. There are two rows of teeth in the jaws, the front row is made up of between 6 and 6 sharp, canine-like teeth with molar-like teeth to the rear of them. The margin of the preoperculum is smooth. The dorsal fin is low and is supported by 12 spines while the anal fin is short-based and is supported by 3 short spines and 8 soft rays> The long pectoral fins are clearly longer than the pelvic fins. The cheeks and gill covers are scaled but there are no scales on the snout or between the eyes and the mouth. There are between 48 and 60 scales in the lateral line and there no large blotch at its origin. The largest species in the genus is P. auratus with a maximum published total length of 130 cm (51 in), while the smallest is P. africanus with a maximum published total length of 75 cm (30 in).

== Distribution and habitat ==
Pagrus seabreams are found in the Atlantic Ocean, where P. pagrus occurs on both sides of the Ocean and in the Mediterranean, while the eastern Atlantic and the Mediterranean Sea have two other native species, P. auriga and P. caeruleostictus. P. africanus is found in the eastern Atlantic Ocean off West Africa. The remaining two species are found in the Western Pacific Ocean. However, P. major has been introduced into the Mediterranean probably as a result of escapes from aquaculture. These fishes prefer hard bottoms but may be found in estuaries.

== Biology ==
Pagrus seabreams are carnivores, using their crushing molars to feed on molluscs and crustaceans but they have also been found to eat softer bodied prey such as cephalopods and fishes. P. pagrus and P. caeruleostictus are at least partial protogynous hermaphrodites.

== Fisheries ==
Pagrus seabreams are valued as food fishes, as well as being used to produce fish meal and fish oil, and are targeted by fisheries wherever they occur. They are also used in aquaculture in both Japan and the Mediterranean.
