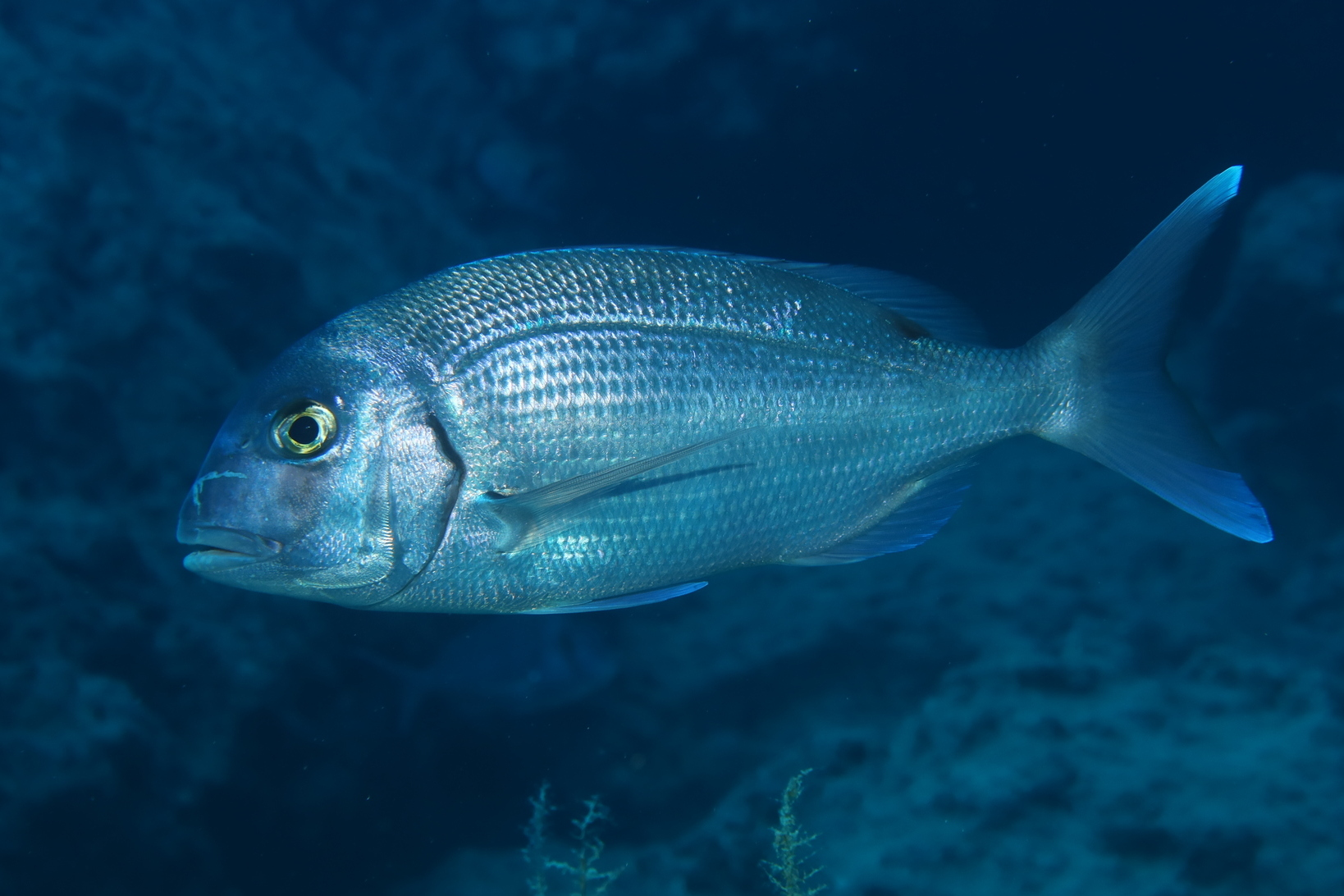
- In Turkey

Conservation status
- Least Concern (IUCN 3.1)

Scientific classification
- Kingdom: Animalia
- Phylum: Chordata
- Class: Actinopterygii
- Division: Teleostei
- Order: Acanthuriformes
- Family: Sparidae
- Genus: Pagrus
- Species: P. pagrus

Binomial name
- Pagrus pagrus (Linnaeus, 1758)

Synonyms
- Sparus pagrus Linnaeus, 1758; Pagrus pagrus pagrus (Linnaeus, 1758); Pagrus vulgaris Valenciennes, 1830; Pagrus sedecim Ginsburg, 1952

= Red porgy =

Species of fish

The red porgy (Pagrus pagrus), also known as the common seabream or Couch's bream, is a species of marine ray-finned fish in the family Sparidae. It is found in shallow waters on either side of the Atlantic Ocean, being present on the western coast of Europe and the Mediterranean Sea as well as the eastern coasts of North and South America and the Caribbean Sea. It feeds on or near the seabed and most individuals start life as females and later change sex to males.

== Taxonomy ==
This fish was first described in 1758 by the Swedish naturalist Carl Linnaeus in the tenth edition of his System Naturae. He gave it the name Sparus pagrus but it has since been moved to the genus Pagrus. Common names given to this fish include red porgy, common seabream and porgy. Along the Gulf Coast, it is known as the white snapper, even though it is not a true snapper. In the United Kingdom, it is known as Couch's seabream after the Cornish ichthyologist Dr. Jonathan Couch who first discovered this species in the waters around Britain.

== Description ==
The red porgy is a moderately deep-bodied fish with an oblong shaped body. The standard length is 75 cm (30 in), although a more typical length is about half of this. The dorsal fin has eleven to thirteen spines and nine to ten soft rays while the anal fin has three spines and seven to eight soft rays. This fish is a silvery-pink colour, with darker patches on the nape and behind the pectoral fins. The caudal fin is dark pink with paler tips, and the other fins are pale pink.

== Distribution and habitat ==
The red porgy is found in warm coastal waters on either side of the Atlantic Ocean. On the eastern side, its range extends from southern Britain to Western Sahara, including the waters around the Canary Islands and Madeira and the Mediterranean Sea; its range includes the Sea of Marmara but does not extend into the Black Sea. On the western side of the Atlantic, its range extends from the eastern coast of the United States southward to Argentina; it is present in the Gulf of Mexico and the western part of the Caribbean Sea but not the eastern part. Although it may go as deep as 250 m (820 ft), it more commonly occurs at depths between 10 and 80 m (30 and 260 ft), on continental shelves. It is a demersal species, being found over both rocky areas and areas with soft sediment; juveniles often inhabit beds of seagrass or sometimes enter lagoons.

== Ecology ==
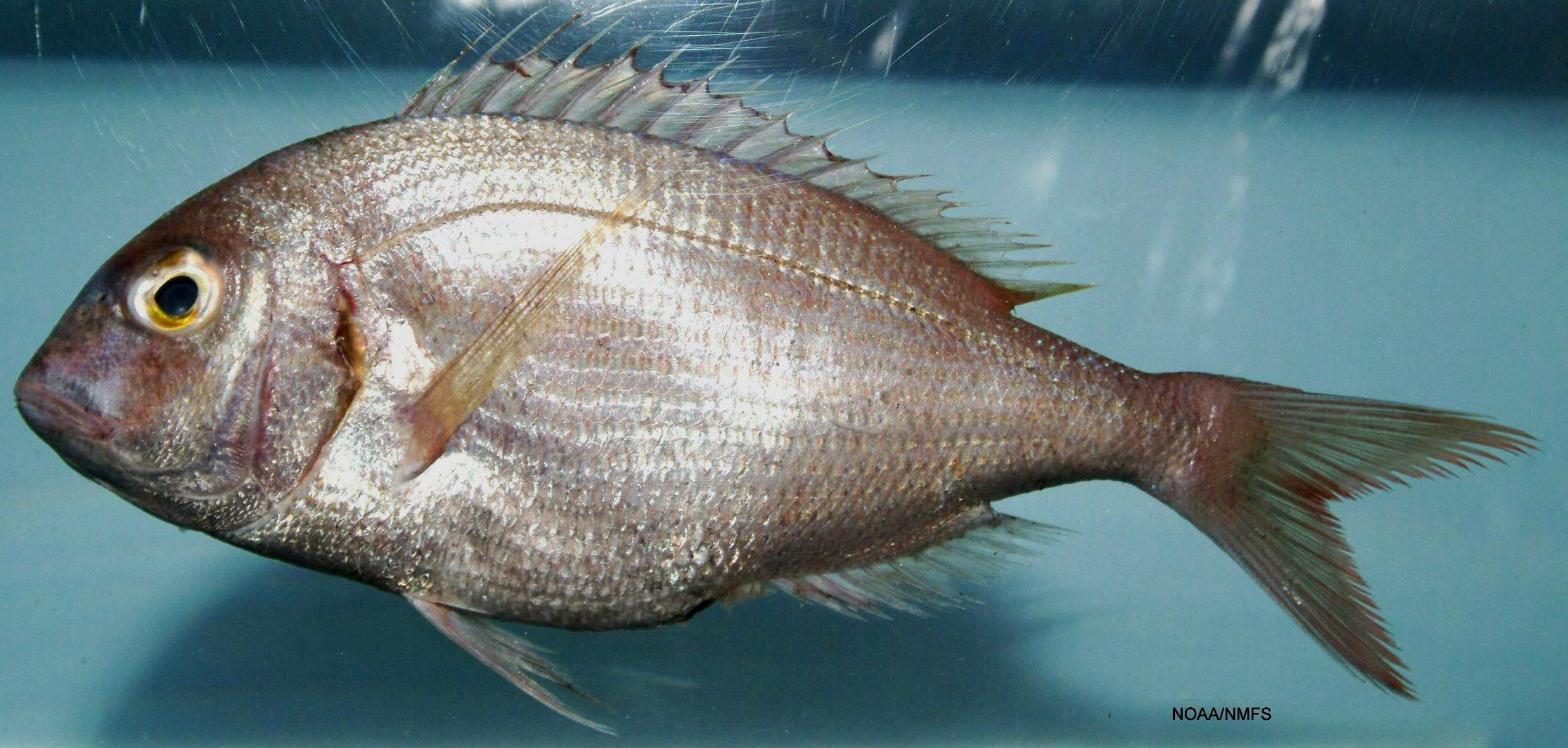
From the Gulf of Mexico

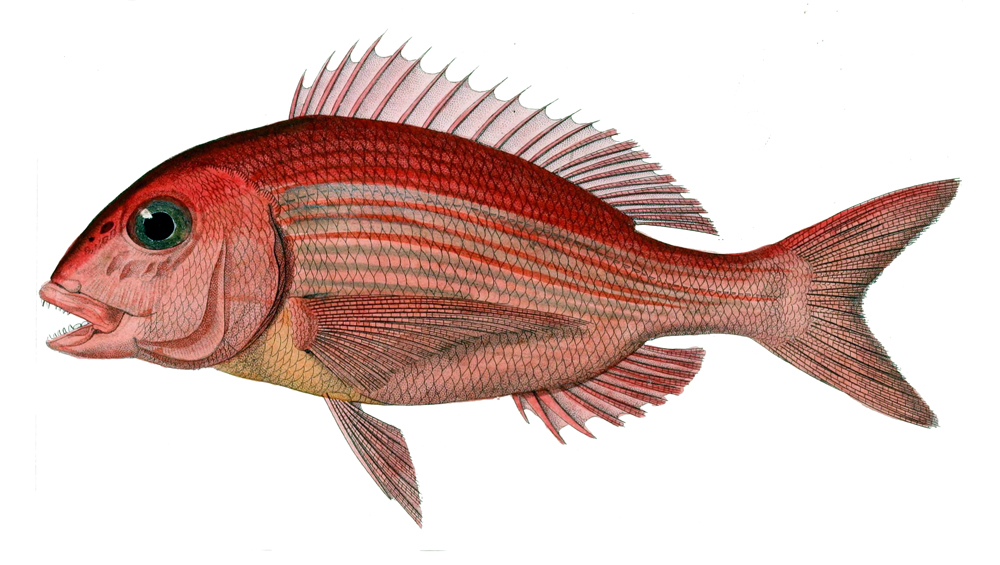
1828 illustration

Red porgies are demersal fish, feeding mostly on or near the seabed on crustaceans, molluscs and small fish.

They are protogynous hermaphrodites, with most individuals starting life as females and at some point changing sex to males. The fish reach sexual maturity at two or three years of age. The sex change occurs at a wide range of sizes (206 to 417 mm (8.1 to 16.4 in) TL) and a wide range of ages (two to nine years). Not all fish change sex: some fish are primary males whose ovarian tissue atrophies before they reach maturity, others are secondary males, behaving as females for a few cycles before changing sex, and some remain as females even when large, with only rudimentary male tissue being present. There is some evidence that the timing of the sex change is linked to social or environmental factors.

== Status ==
The red porgy is an important species for both commercial and recreational fishing, especially on the southeastern coast of the United States, Argentina, and the Mediterranean Sea. It is usually taken by rod and line. Populations have declined because of over-exploitation, but in some areas minimum size limits have been set to try to redress this. Stocks have also been augmented by the use of aquaculture, particularly in the Mediterranean, and aquaculture is being considered in North America. Despite the population declines in some areas and the fish's complex biological needs, overall, it is not at risk of extinction and the International Union for Conservation of Nature has assessed its conservation status as being of "least concern".
