= San Jacinto Building =

Office building in Beaumont, Texas

- U.S. Historic district – Contributing property
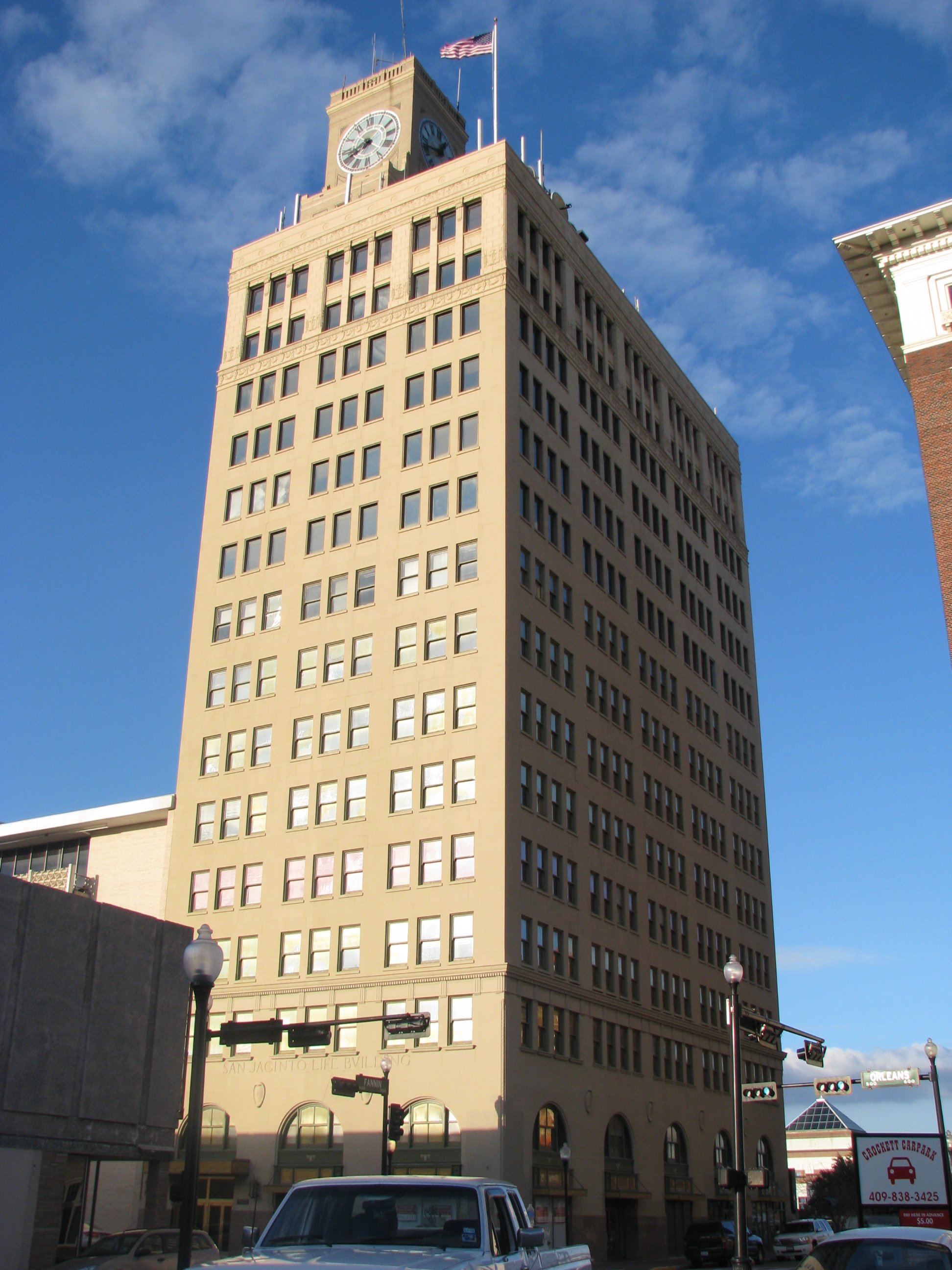
- The building in 2010
- Location: 595 Orleans St., Beaumont, Texas
- Coordinates: 30°4′55.5″N 94°5′53.5″W
- Area: less than one acre
- Built: 1921
- Architect: Sanguinet, Staats, and Gottlieb
- Architectural style: Classical Revival
- Part of: Beaumont Commercial District (ID78002959)
- Designated CP: April 14, 1978

The San Jacinto Building in Beaumont, Texas was built between 1921 and 1922 and was completed for the San Jacinto Life Insurance Company. The building is 15 stories tall and supports a large clock tower on top. Each dial is 17 feet in diameter. The building was altered in the 1950s with the removal of a "cupola" and the cornice that surrounded the building. It is privately owned today and is used as an office building. The building contributes to the Beaumont Commercial District.

== Gallery ==
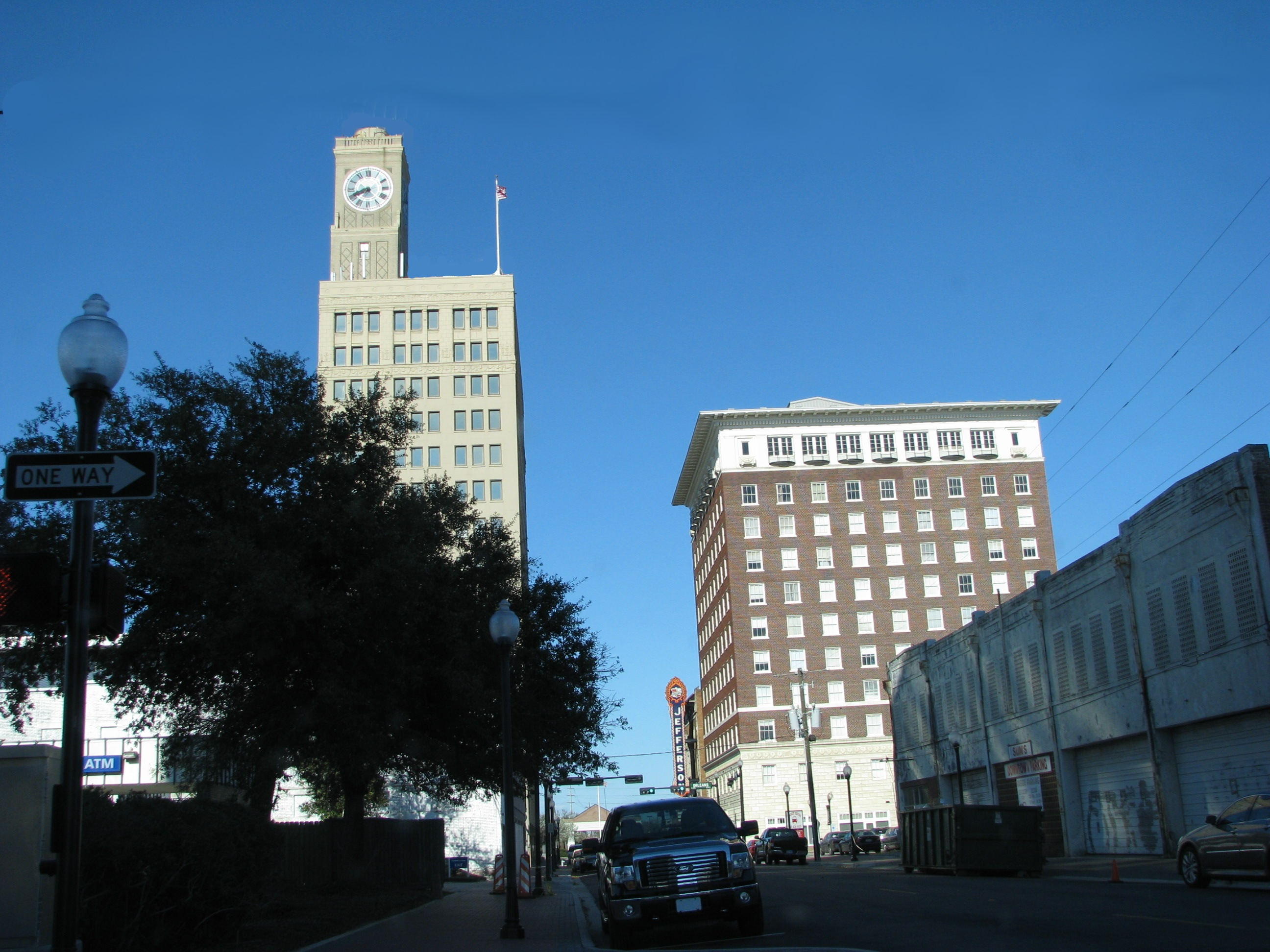
San Jacinto Building (Left) and Hotel Beaumont

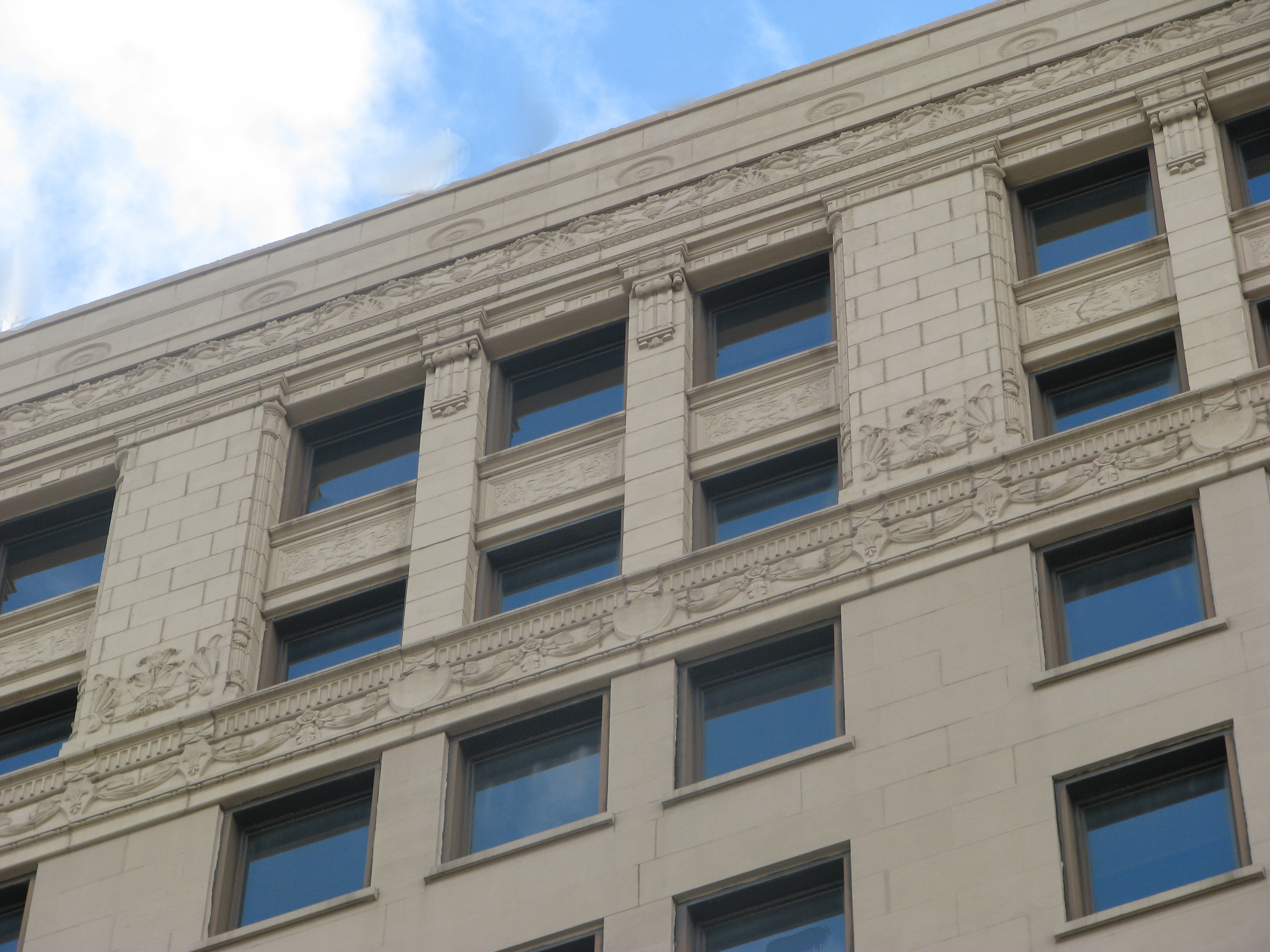
Building detail.

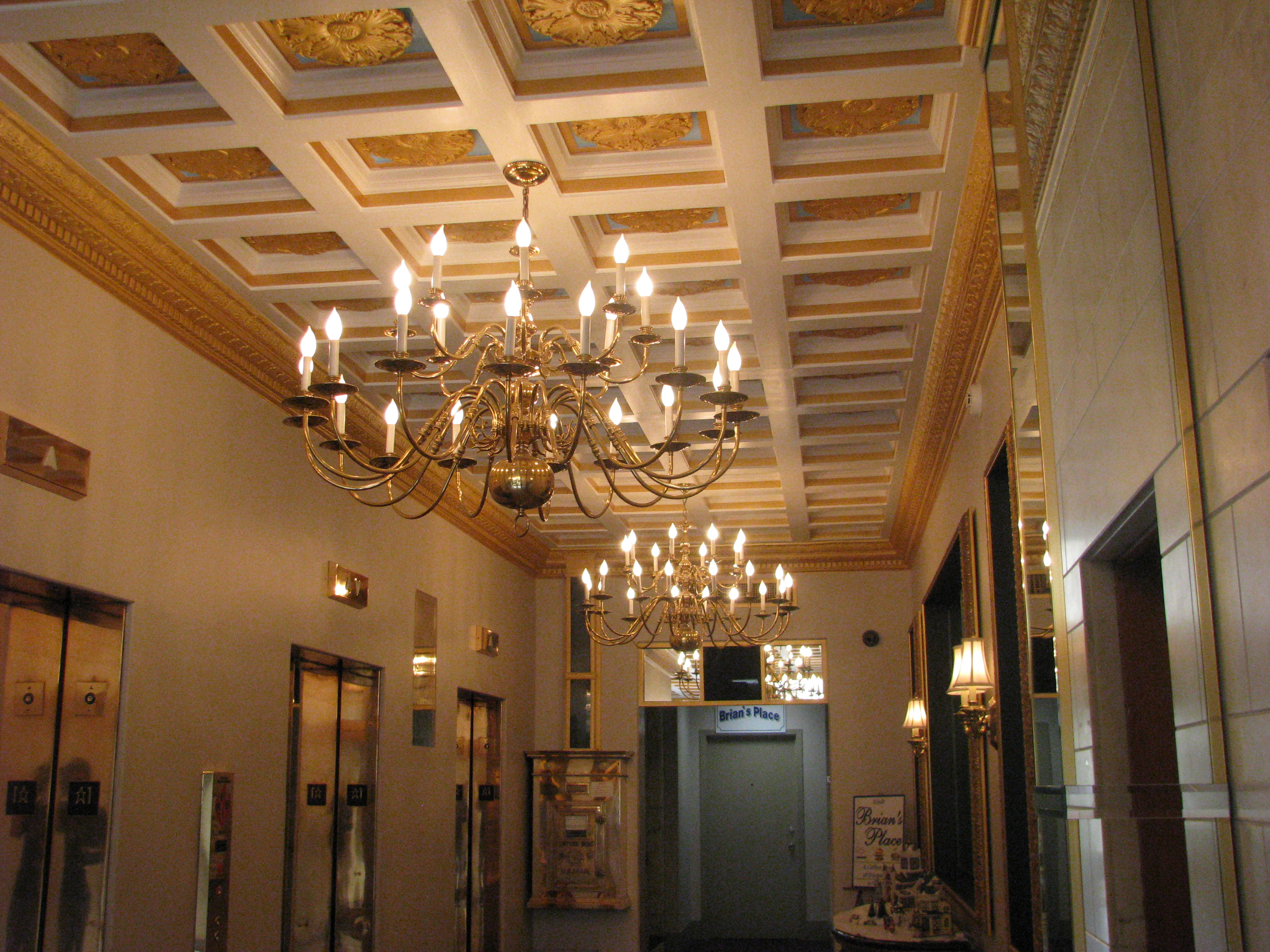
The San Jacinto's lobby

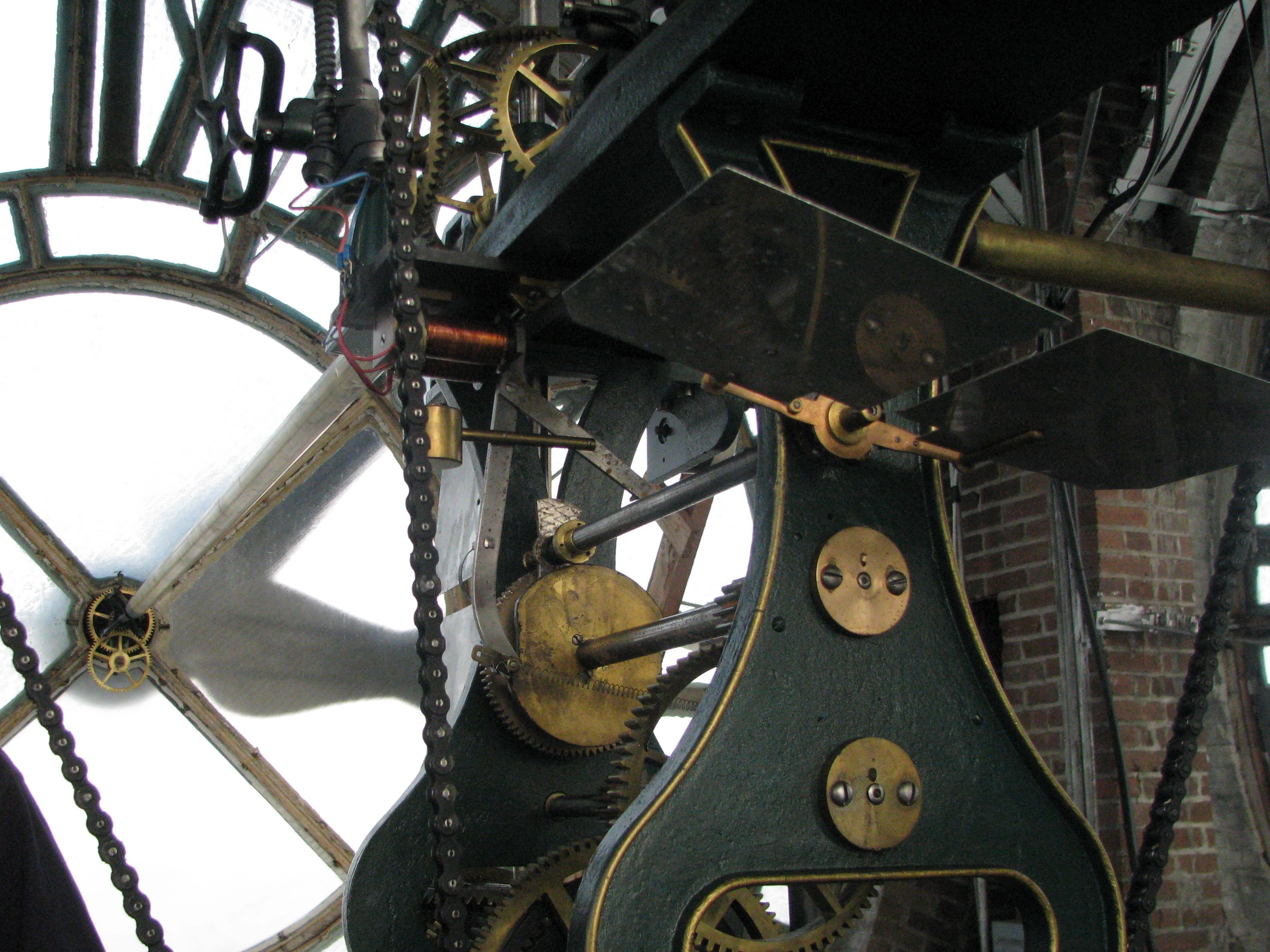
The clock movement and east-facing dial.

== See also ==
- National Register of Historic Places listings in Jefferson County, Texas
