= Orleans Building =

Office building in Beaumont, Texas

- Beaumont Savings and Loan
- U.S. Historic district – Contributing property
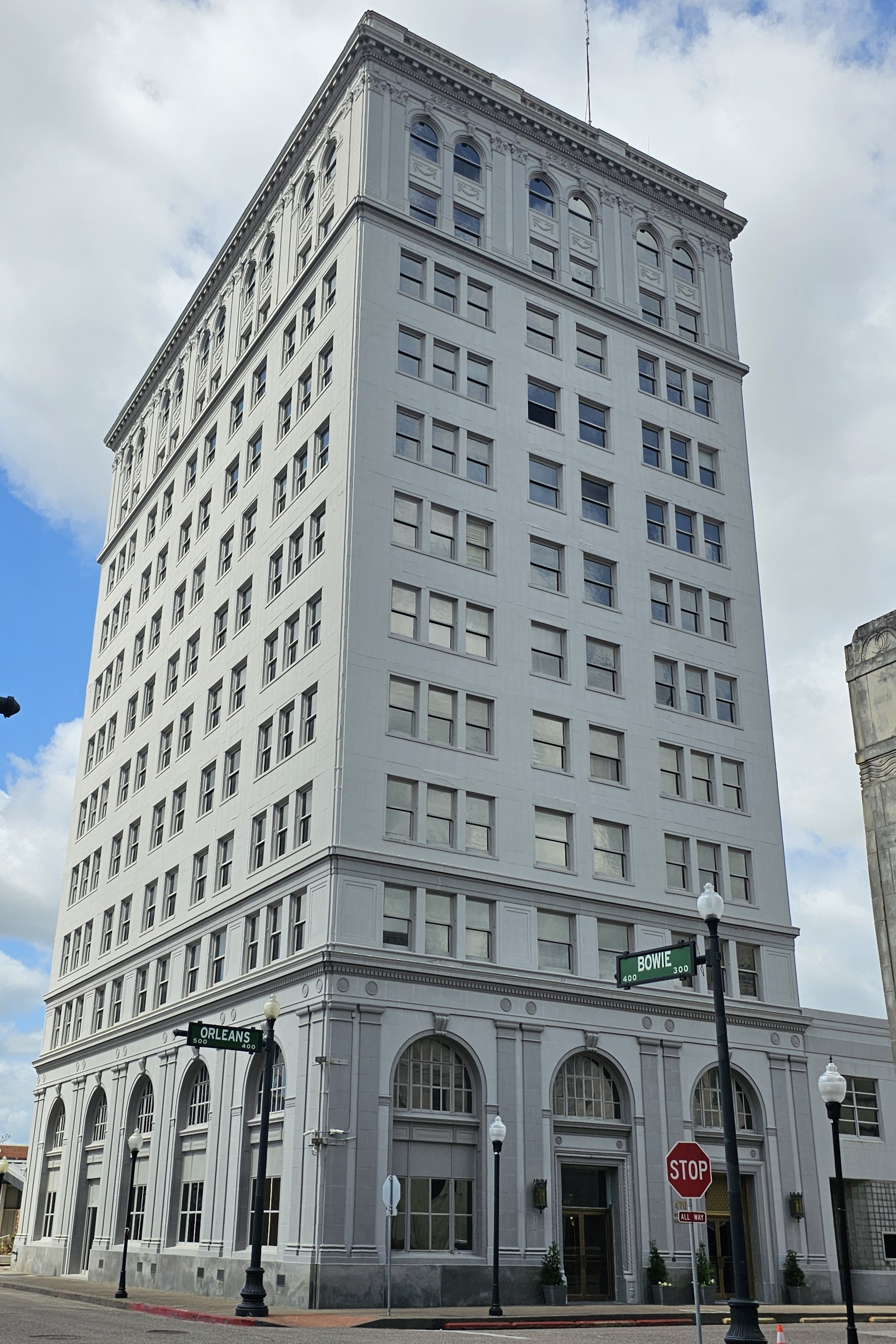
- The building in 2024
- Location: 470 Orleans St., Beaumont, Texas
- Coordinates: 30°04′58″N 94°05′58″W
- Area: less than one acre
- Built: c. 1925
- Architectural style: Classical Revival
- Part of: Beaumont Commercial District (ID78002959)
- Designated CP: April 14, 1978

The Orleans Building in Beaumont, Texas was built in 1925 for the American National Bank. It is located at 470 Orleans St. in Downtown Beaumont. The building is 12 stories tall.

== Photo gallery ==
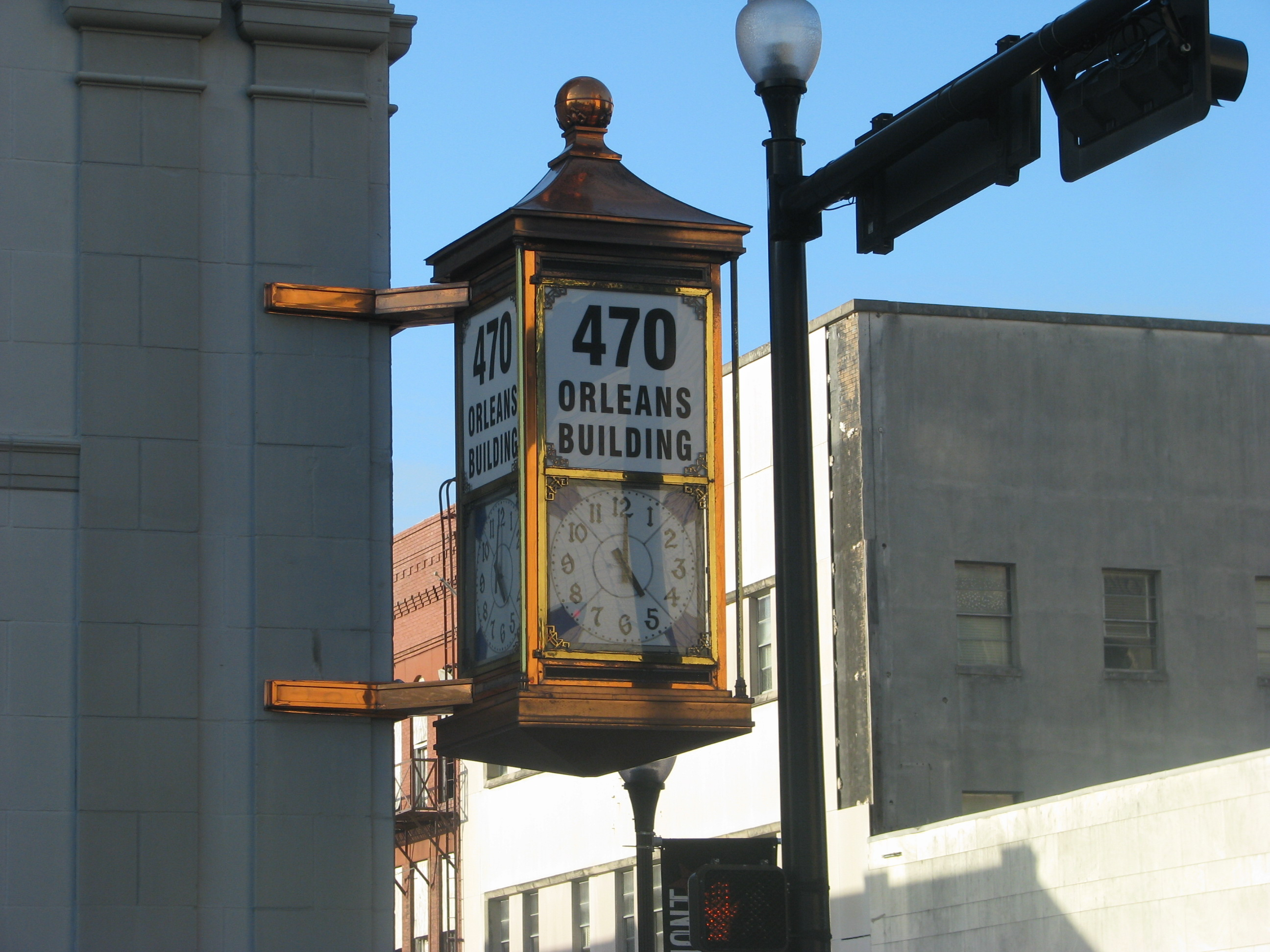
Street Clock

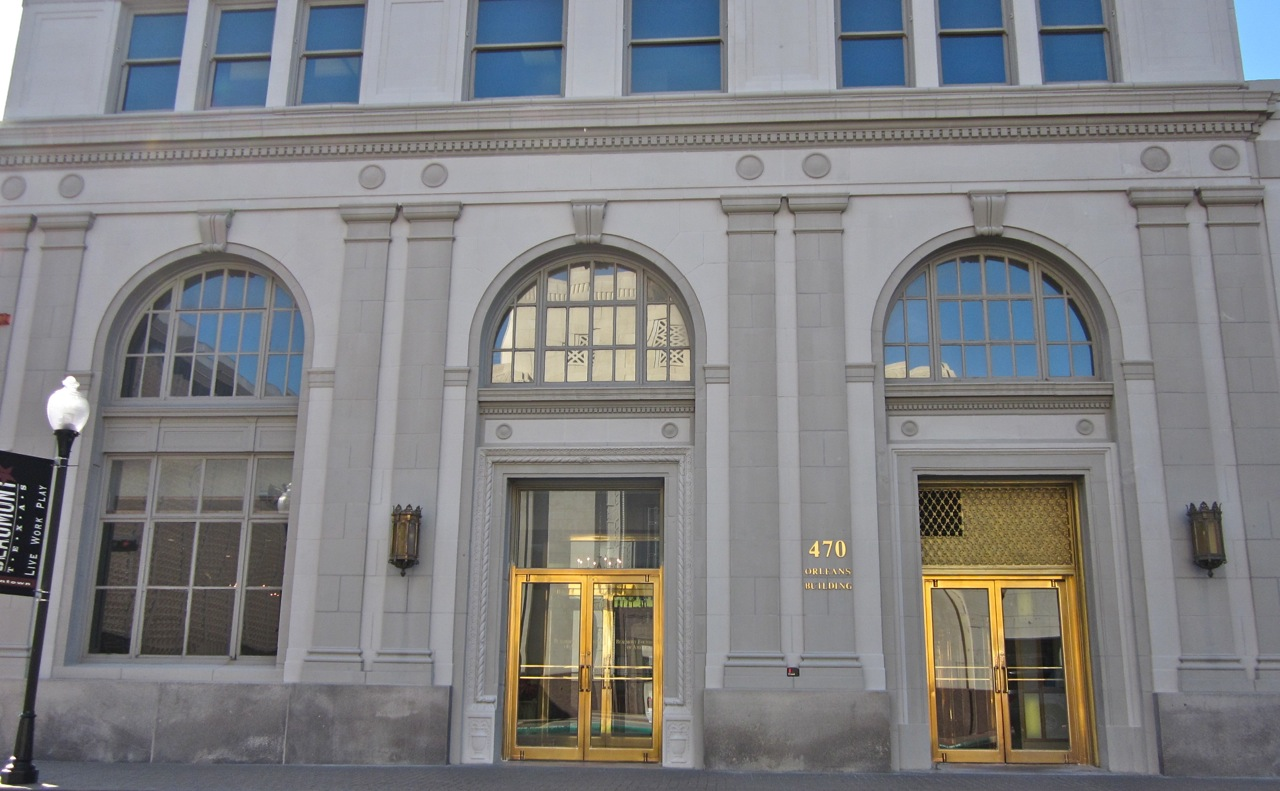
Base of the Building.

== See also ==
- National Register of Historic Places listings in Jefferson County, Texas
