= First City Building =

- First Security National Bank
- U.S. Historic district – Contributing property
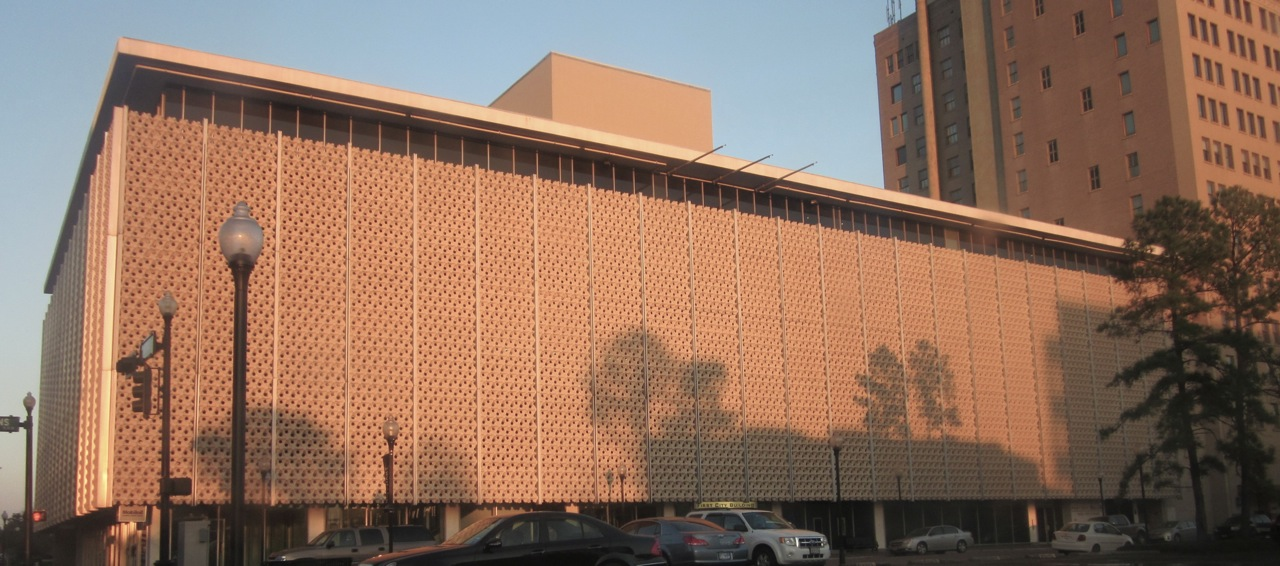
- First Security Bank building in 2011

- Location within Texas Location within the United States
- Location: 505 Orleans St., Beaumont, Texas
- Coordinates: 30°4′57″N 94°5′55″W
- Area: less than one acre
- Built: 1962
- Architect: Llewellyn W. Pitts
- Architectural style: Modern movement
- Part of: Beaumont Commercial District (ID07000892)
- Designated CP: March 4, 2008

The First City Building was built in 1962 for the First Security National Bank. The five-story building was built by renowned architect L.W. Pitts and built in the modernism style. It is known for its facade of cast concrete, sculpted by Beaumont artist Herring Coe, designed to reflect the sun and reduce cooling costs. The building is used as offices today.

== Photo gallery ==
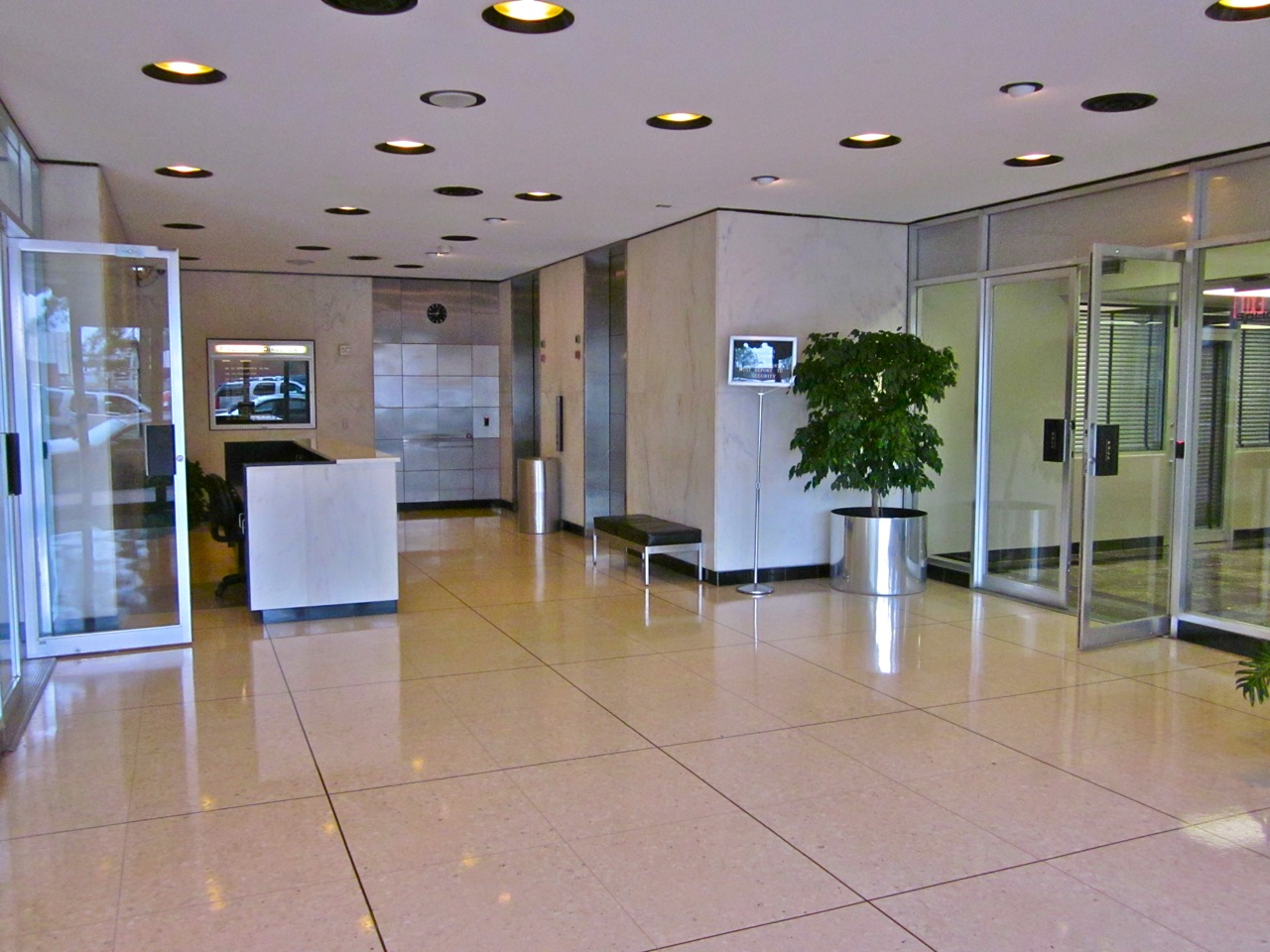
Main lobby.

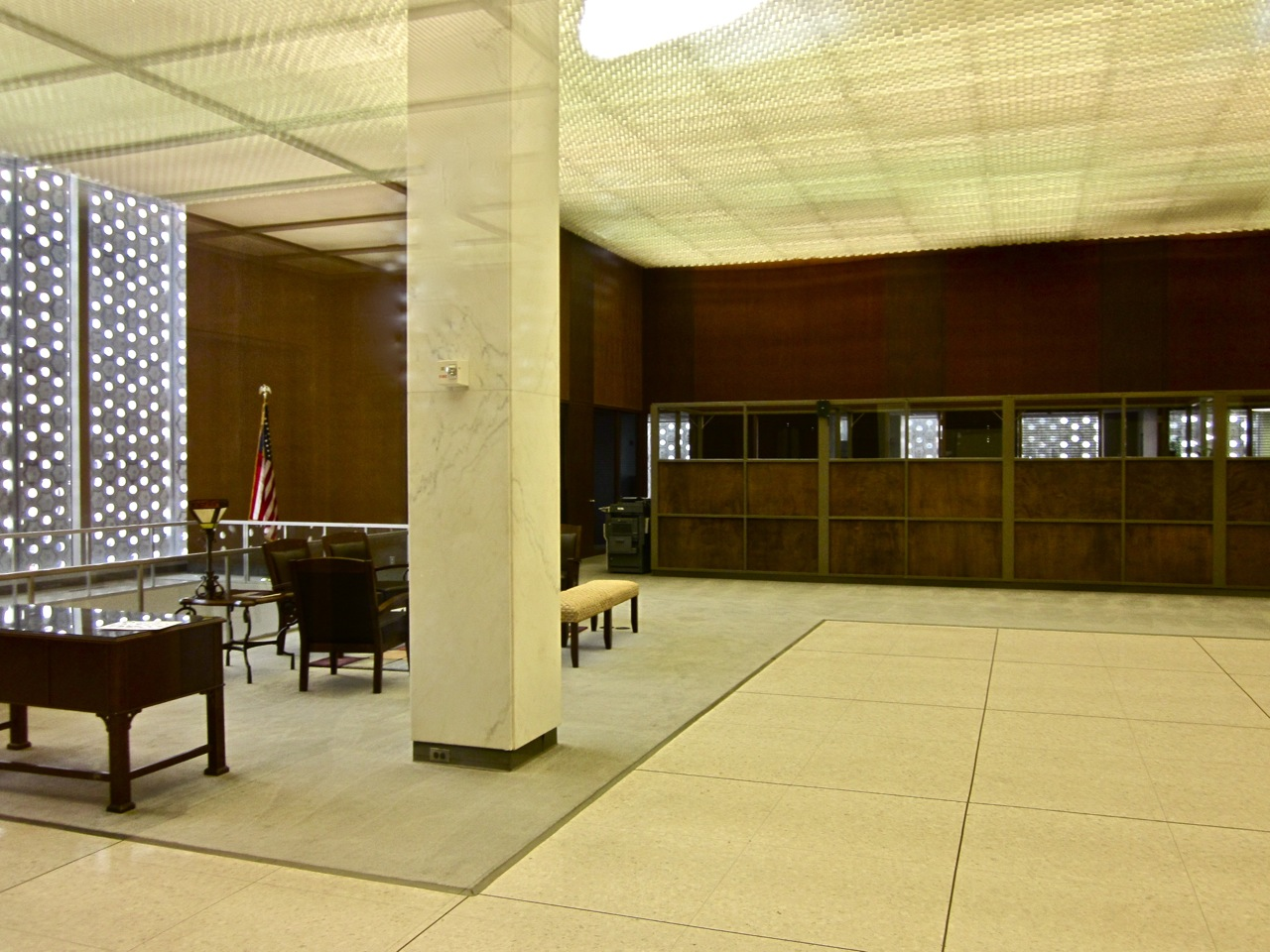
Banking lobby.

== See also ==
- National Register of Historic Places listings in Jefferson County, Texas
