= Gilbert Building (Beaumont, Texas) =

- U.S. Historic district – Contributing property
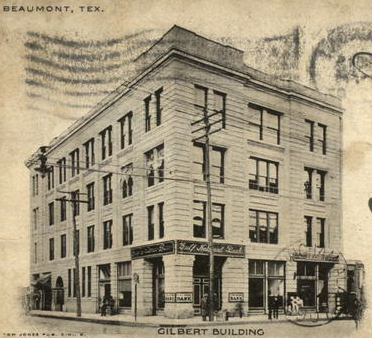
- Early 1900s photo of the Gilbert Building

- Location within Texas Location within the United States
- Location: 328 Bowie St., Beaumont, Texas
- Coordinates: 30°05′00″N 94°05′55″W
- Area: less than one acre
- Built: 1902
- Architect: Galveston architect George B. Stowe
- Architectural style: Sullivanesque
- Part of: Beaumont Commercial District (ID78002959)
- Designated CP: April 14, 1978

The Gilbert Building is a four-story Sullivanesque style building in downtown Beaumont, Texas. It was built in 1902 for John N. Gilbert by renowned Galveston architect George B. Stowe. Gulf National Bank, the new building's first tenant, opened its doors on Tuesday, September 3, 1902. It was subsequently remodeled in 1926 by architects F. W. Steinman & Son. The Gilbert Building contributes to the Beaumont Commercial District listed in the National Register of Historic Places. As of July 2010, the building is abandoned. On June 6, 2024, the building suffered a catastrophic two-alarm fire.

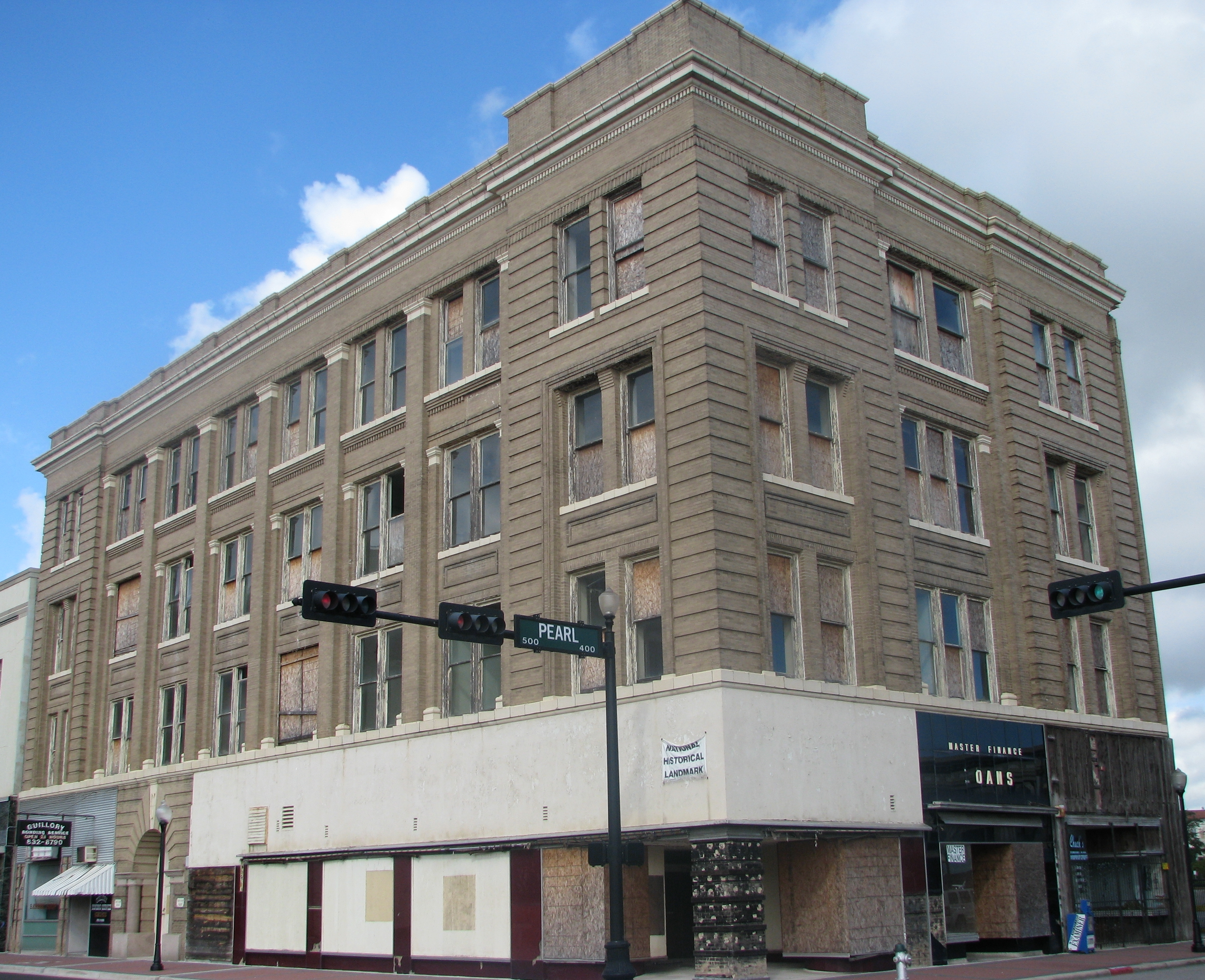
Corner Shot

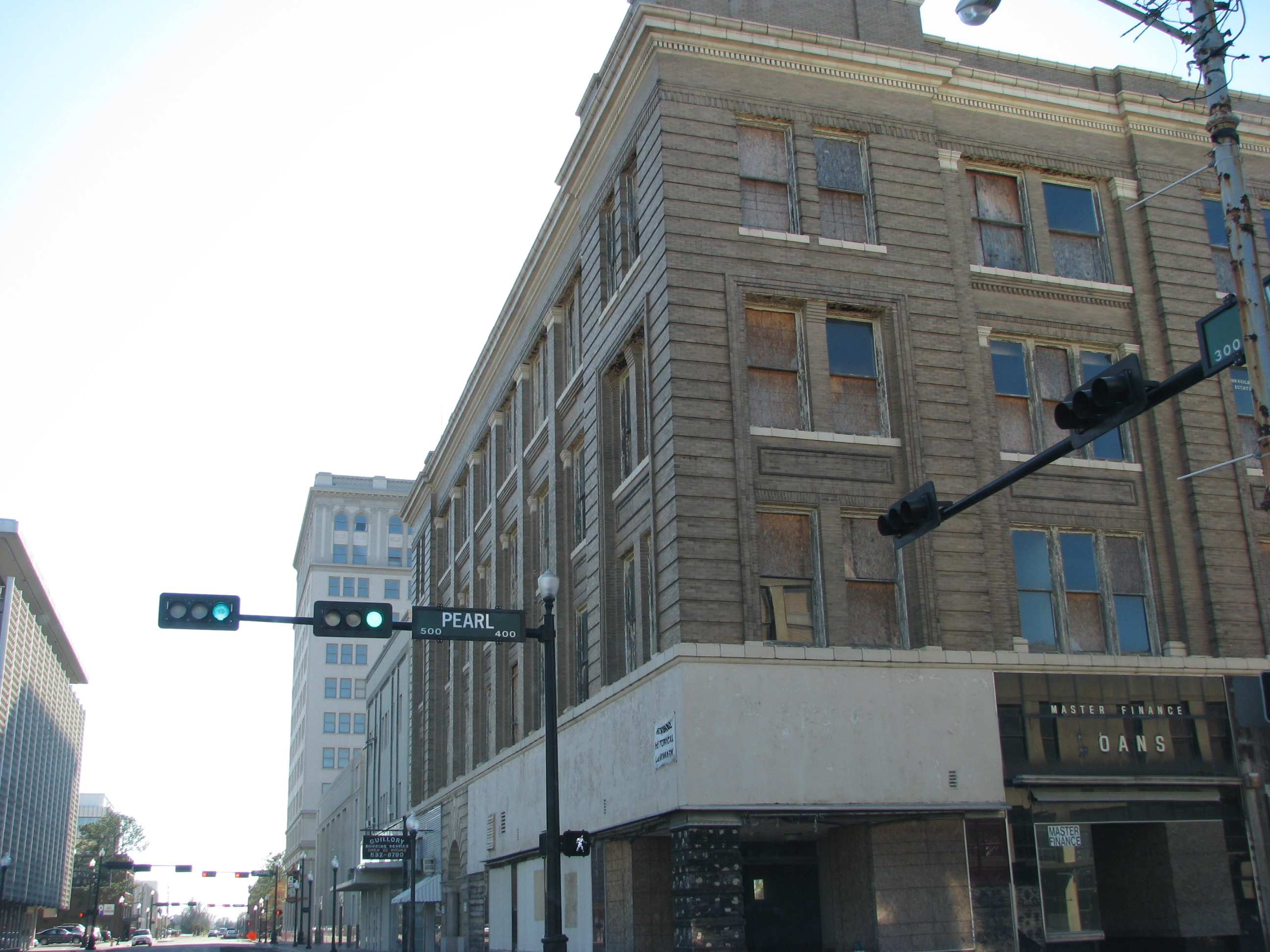
The Gilbert building from the street.

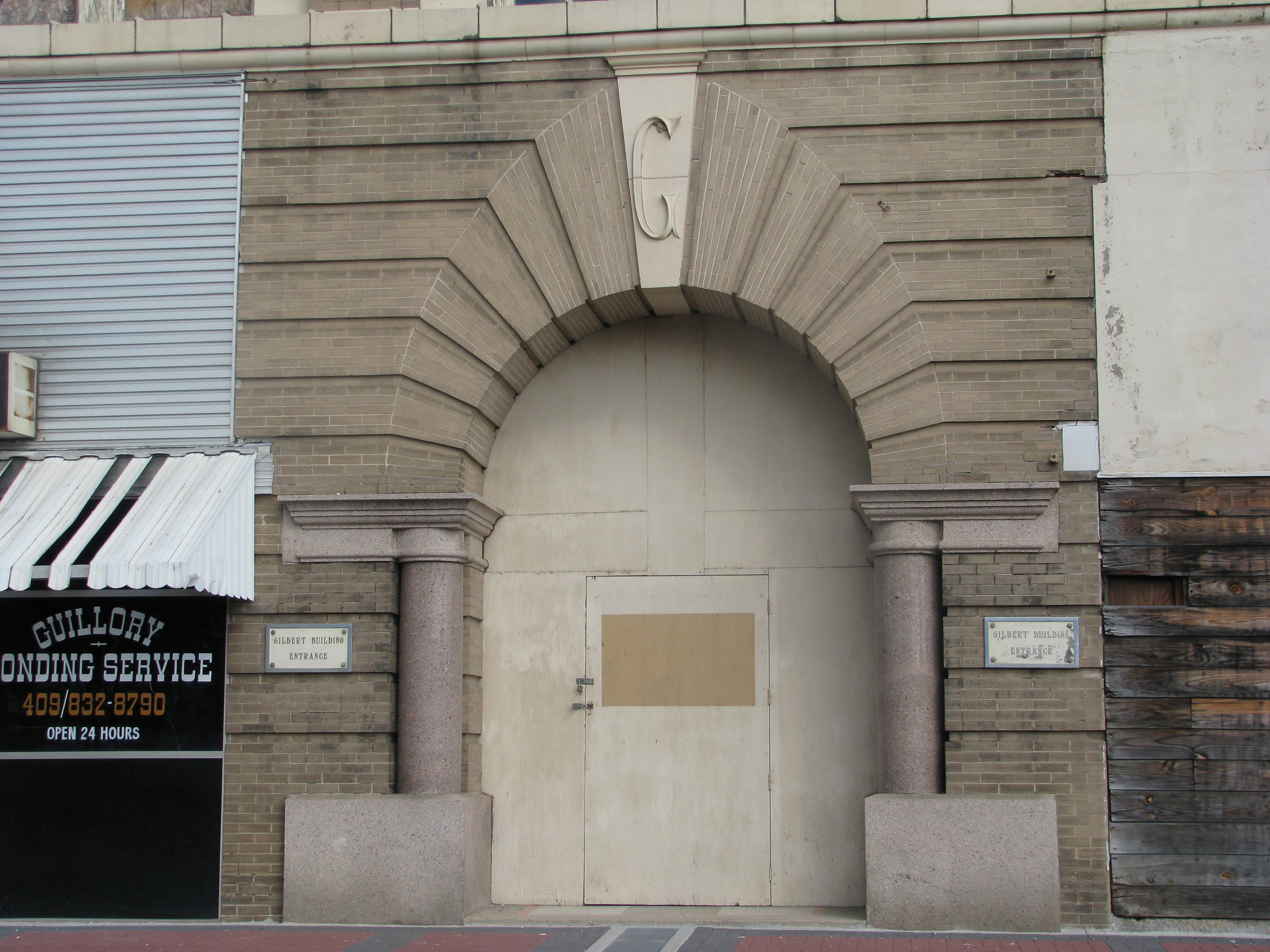
The last exposed and unaltered piece of the buildings base.

== See also ==
- National Register of Historic Places listings in Jefferson County, Texas
