= Beaumont Commercial District =

Historic district in Texas, United States

- U.S. National Register of Historic Places
- U.S. Historic district
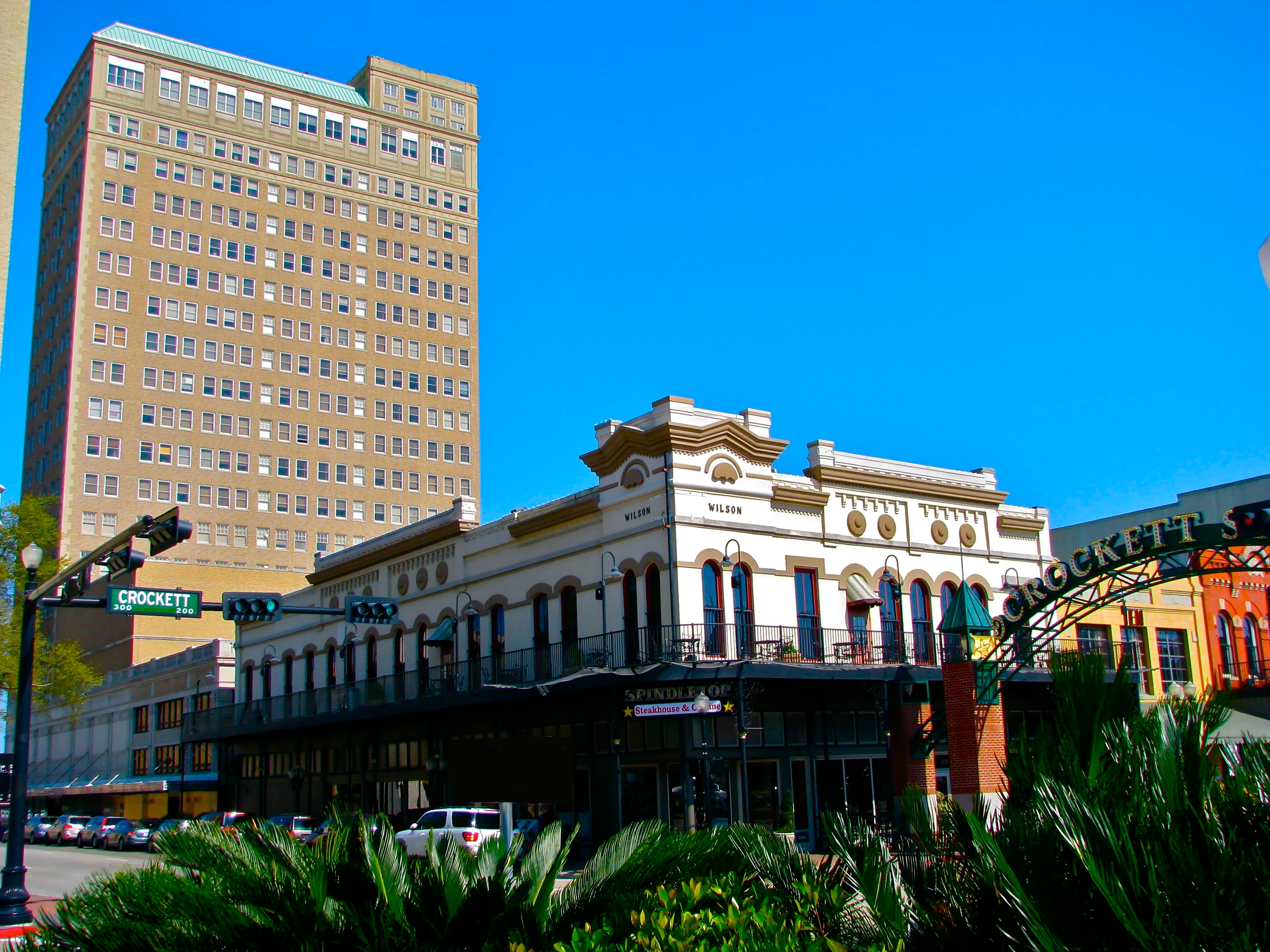
- Corner of Crockett and Pearl streets

- Location within Texas Location within the United States
- Location: Roughly bounded by Willow, Neches, Gilbert, and Main Sts., Beaumont, Texas
- Coordinates: 30°4′55″N 94°5′56″W
- Area: Original: 50 acres (20 ha); Increase: 2.5 acres (1.0 ha)
- Built: 1901
- Architect: Emile Weil, Augustin Babin, et al.
- Architectural style: Classical Revival, Gothic Revival, et al
- NRHP reference No.: 78002959 (original); 07000892 (increase)

Significant dates
- Added to NRHP: April 14, 1978
- Boundary increase: March 4, 2008

The Beaumont Commercial District is located in Downtown Beaumont, Texas. The district consists of various styles of buildings, including 6 highrises built before 1932. The district is registered on the National Register of Historic Places as a U.S. Historic District. The historic district is roughly bounded by Willow, Neches, Gilbert and Main Streets. The Old Spanish Trail (U.S. Route 90) travels through Downtown on Willow, Park, Pearl and College Streets.

== Contributing buildings ==
=== Government/Public Services ===
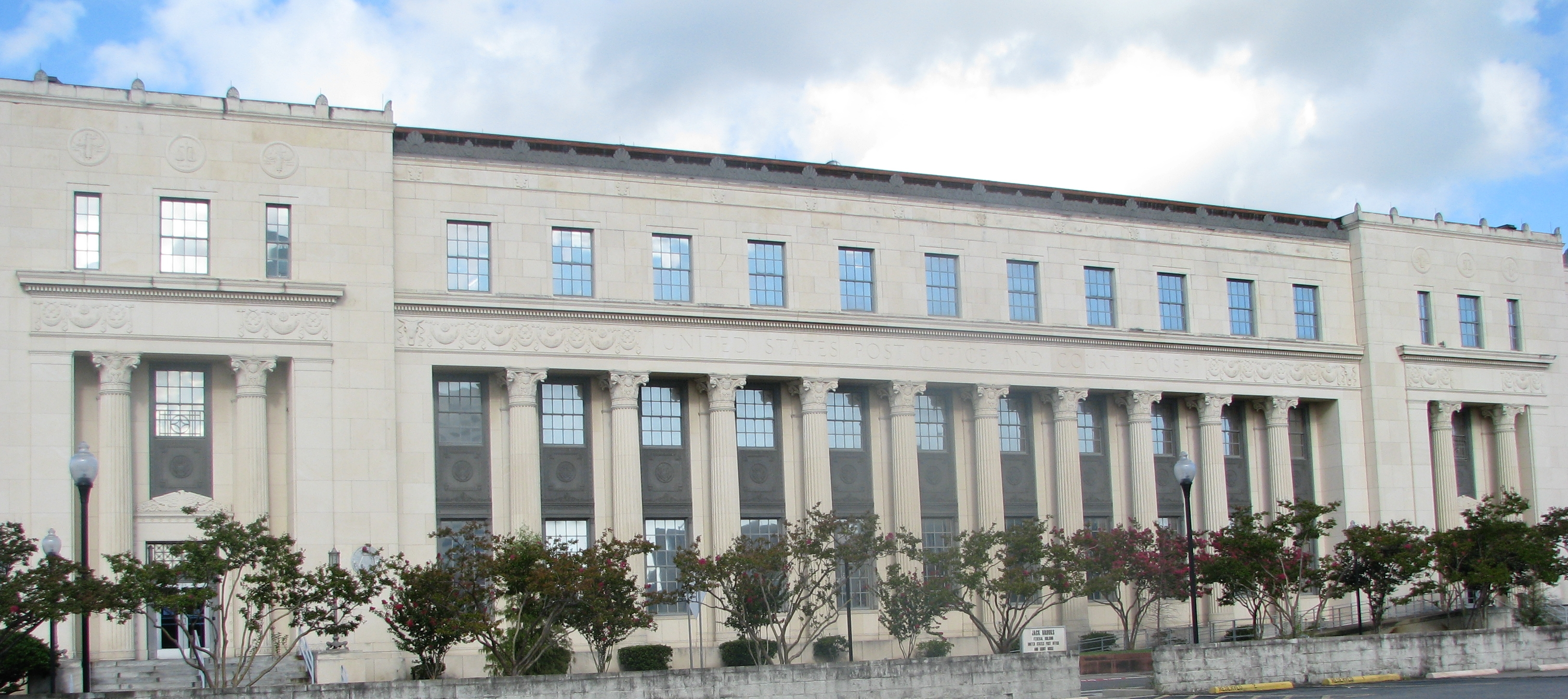
Jack Brooks Federal Building

- Jack Brooks Federal Building

=== Office Building ===
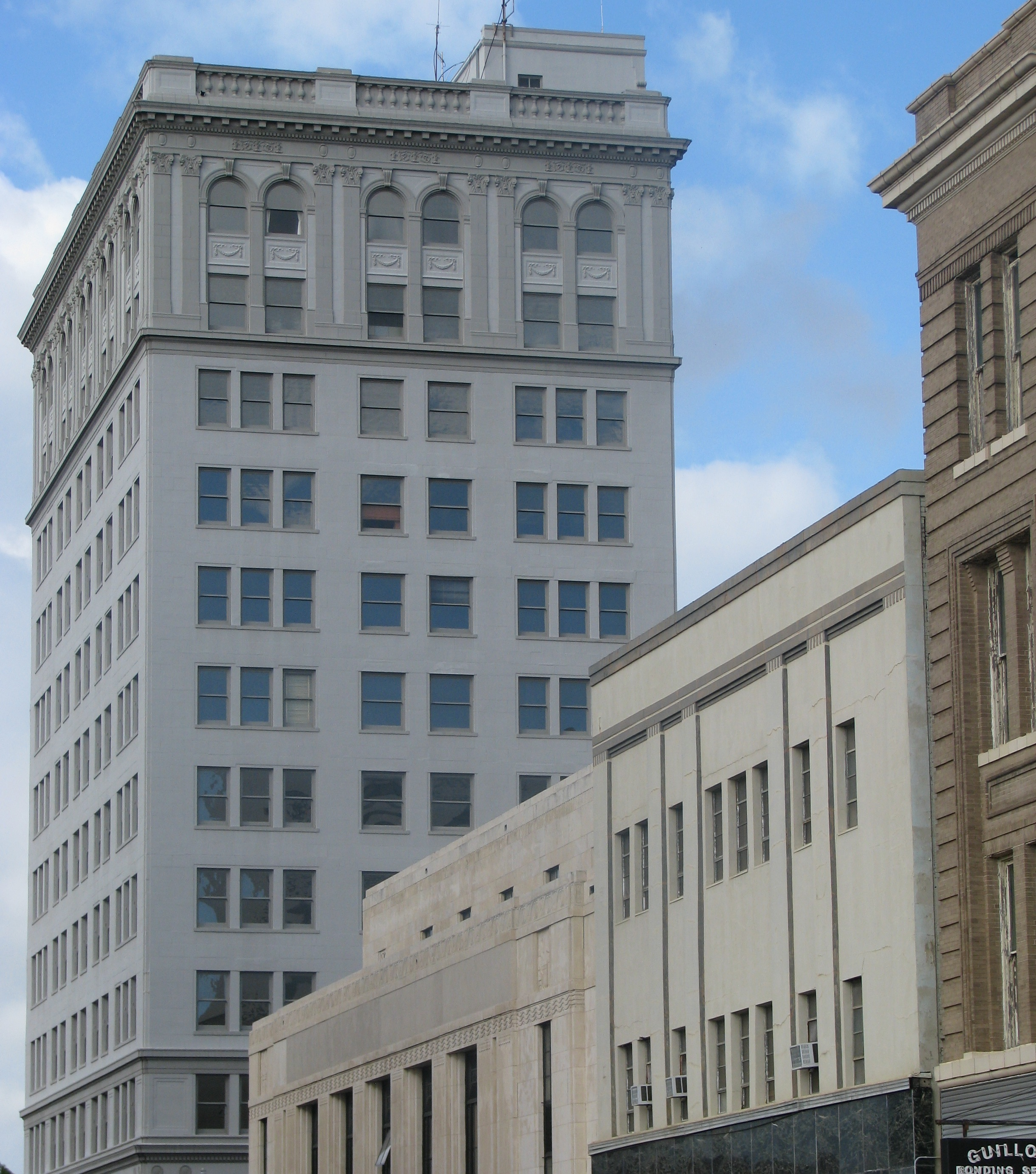
Orleans Building, First National Bank Building, McFaddin Building, Gilbert Building

- Crockett Street (5 Buildings)
- San Jacinto Building
- Goodhue Building
- Orleans Building
- First National Bank Building
- First City Building
- Kyle Building
- Gilbert Building
- Nathan Building
- Fertitta Building
- McFaddin Building
- Boykin Building
- Rotan Mosle Building
- Friedman Building
- Hegele Building
- Coale Building
- Stedman Fruit Co.
- Rosemont Building
- Beaumont Savings
- The White House (Now Municipal Court building.)
- Santa Fe Warehouse
- Neches Electric
- Oil City Brass Works
- Shepherd's Laundry
- Quality Cafe
- 652 Park St.
- 268 Pearl St., circa 1899 (now vacant; formerly Modern Methods Printing; formerly Plummer Printing; formerly site of first Conn's Appliance Store)
- 278 Pearl St., circa 1899 (now The Willard Hall Law Firm; formerly Hall and Hall Real Estate; Formerly Szaffer's Stationery Supply)
- 220 Willow St.

=== Hotel ===
- Hotel Beaumont
- Edson Hotel

=== Auditorium/Entertainment ===
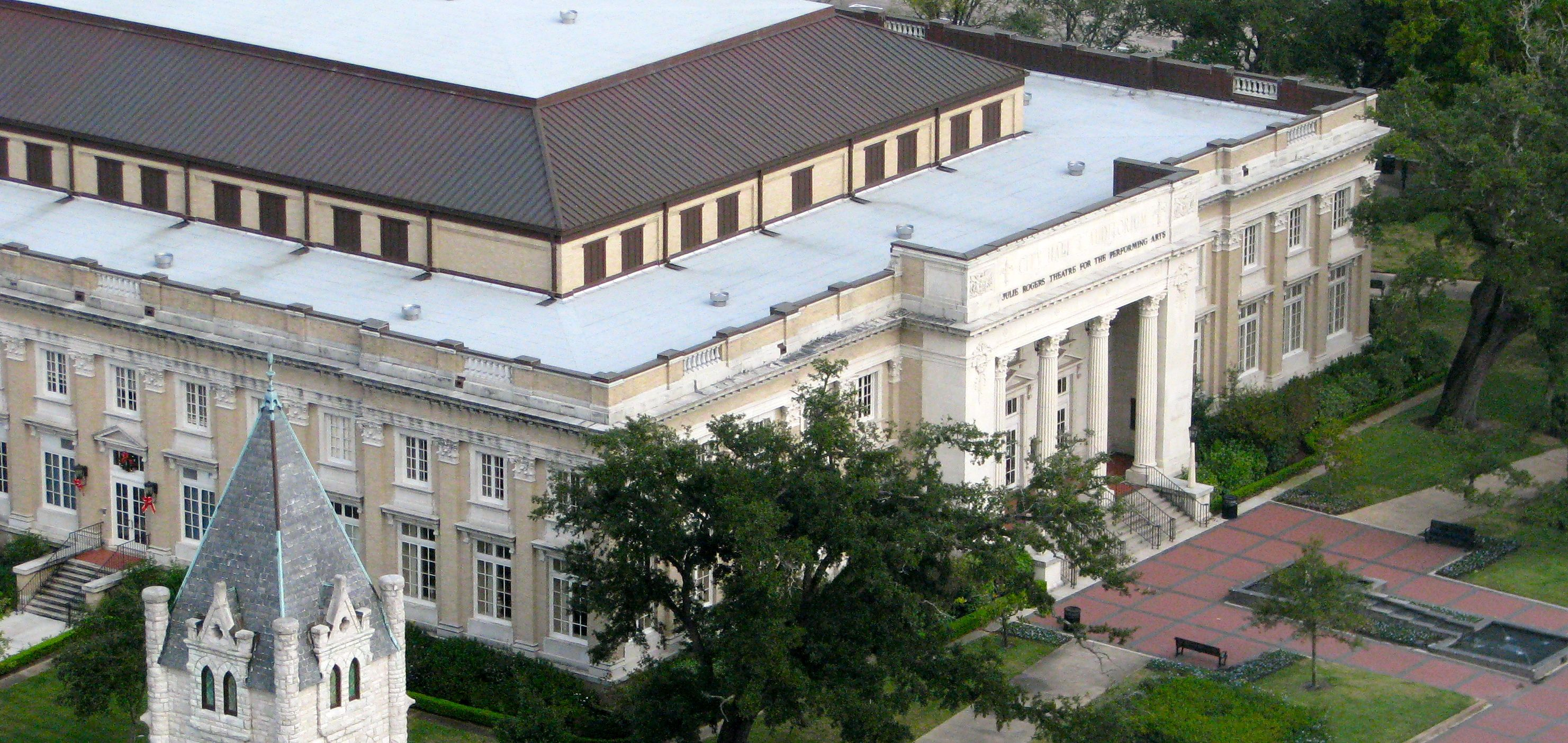
Julie Rogers Theater

- Jefferson Theatre
- Julie Rogers Theater

=== Church ===
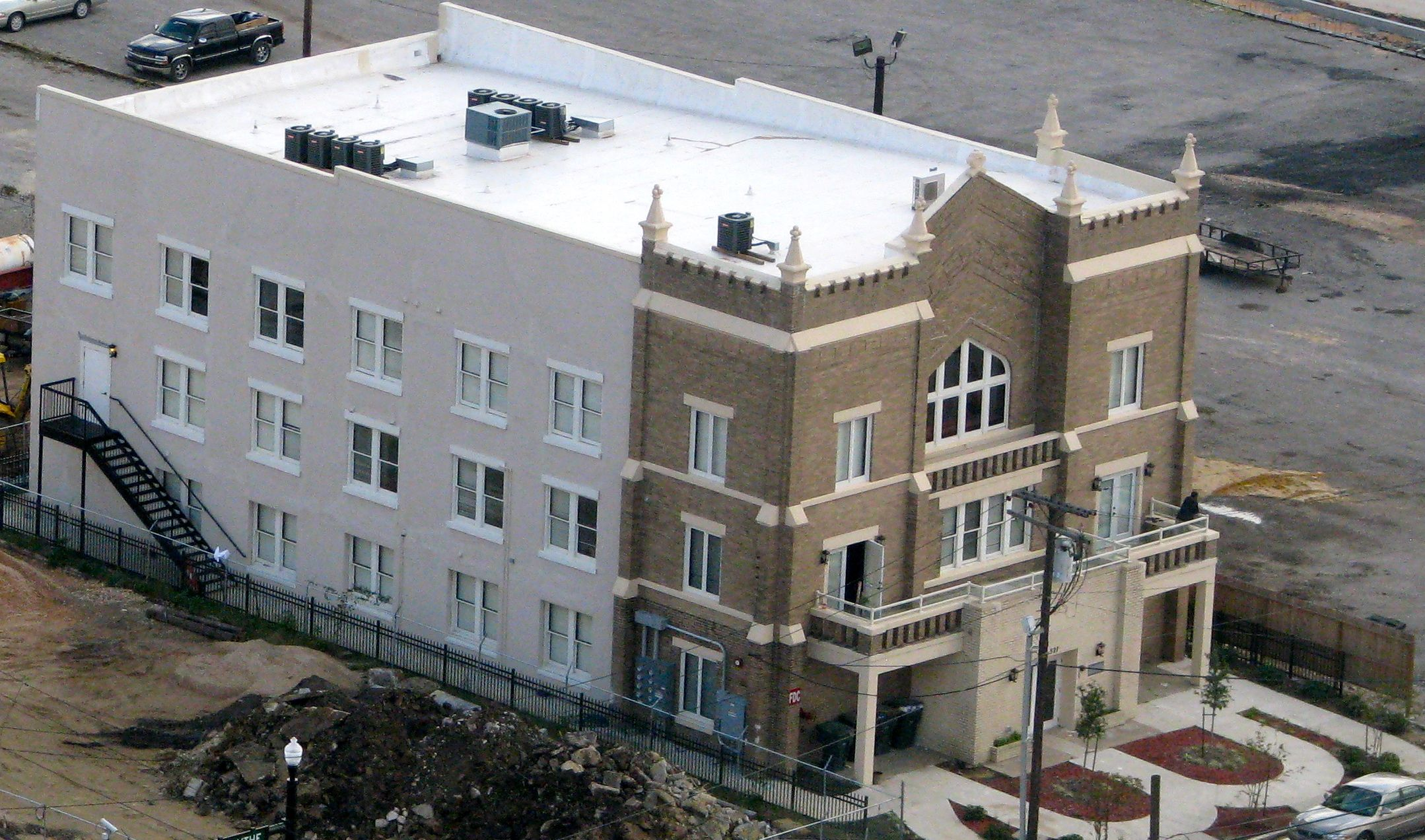
Former Antioch Baptist Church

- Tyrrell Historical Library (Formerly First Baptist)
- Antioch Baptist Church (now lofts)

== Photo gallery ==
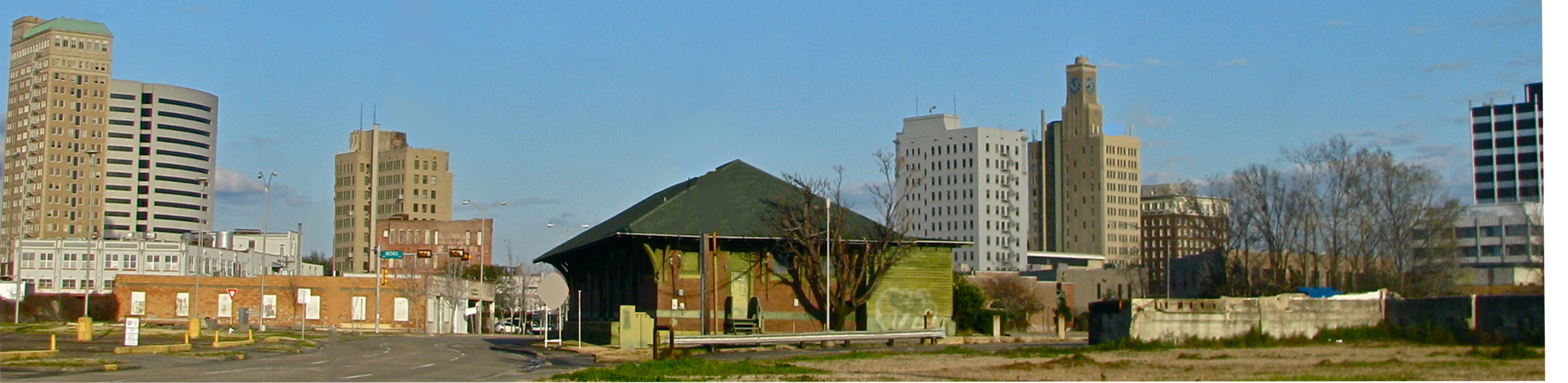
Downtown panorama.

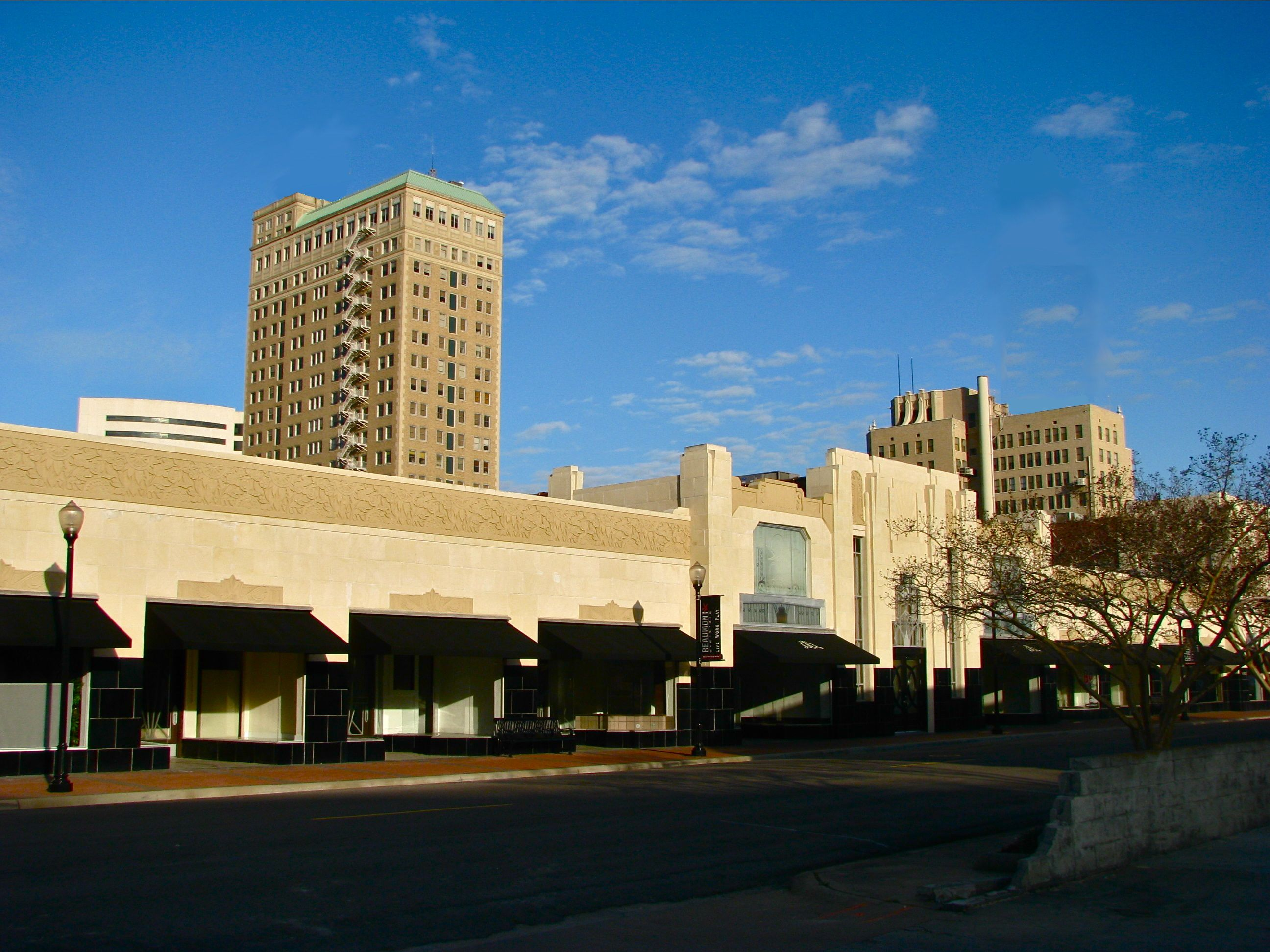
Kyle Building

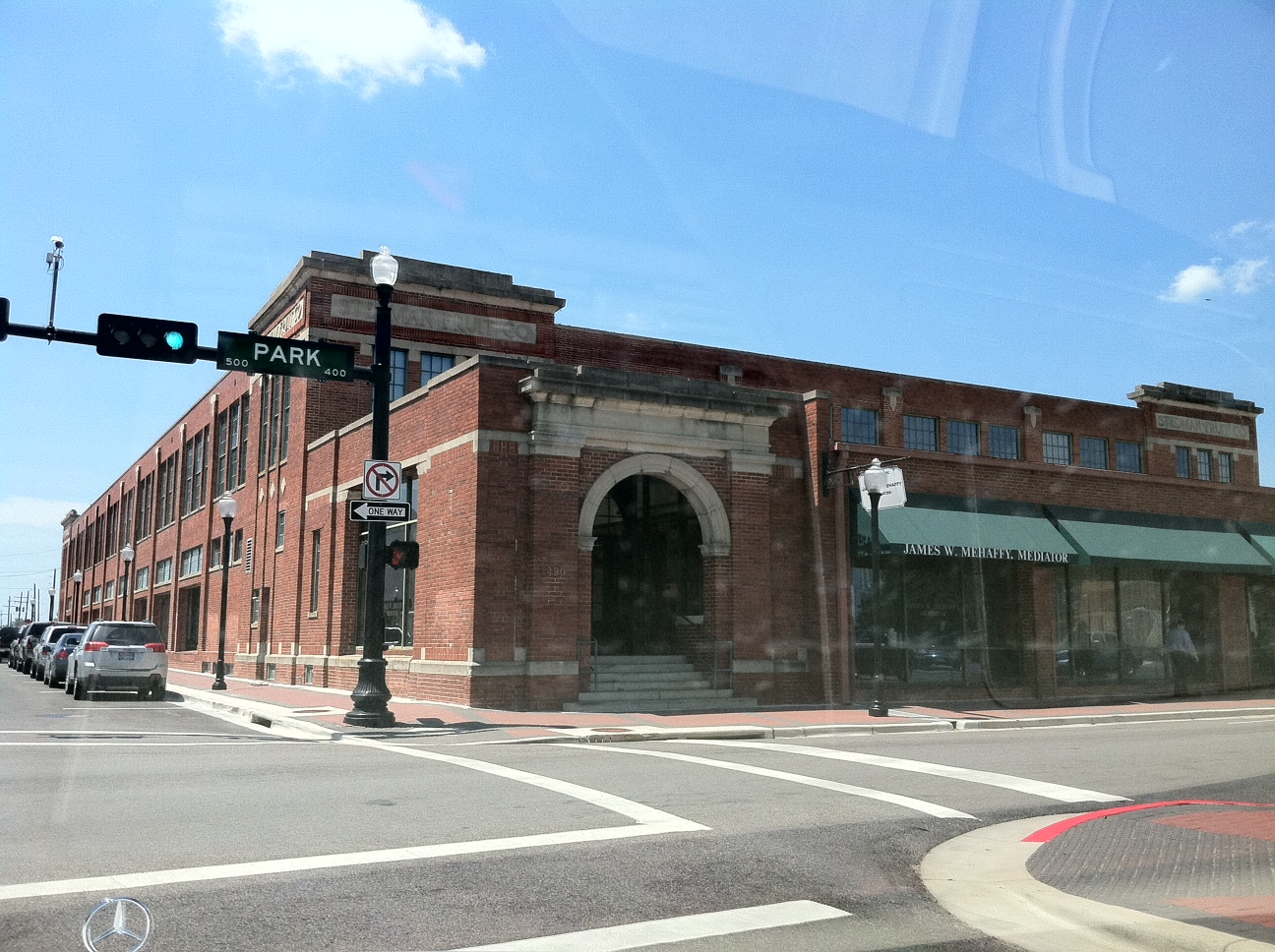
Stedman Building

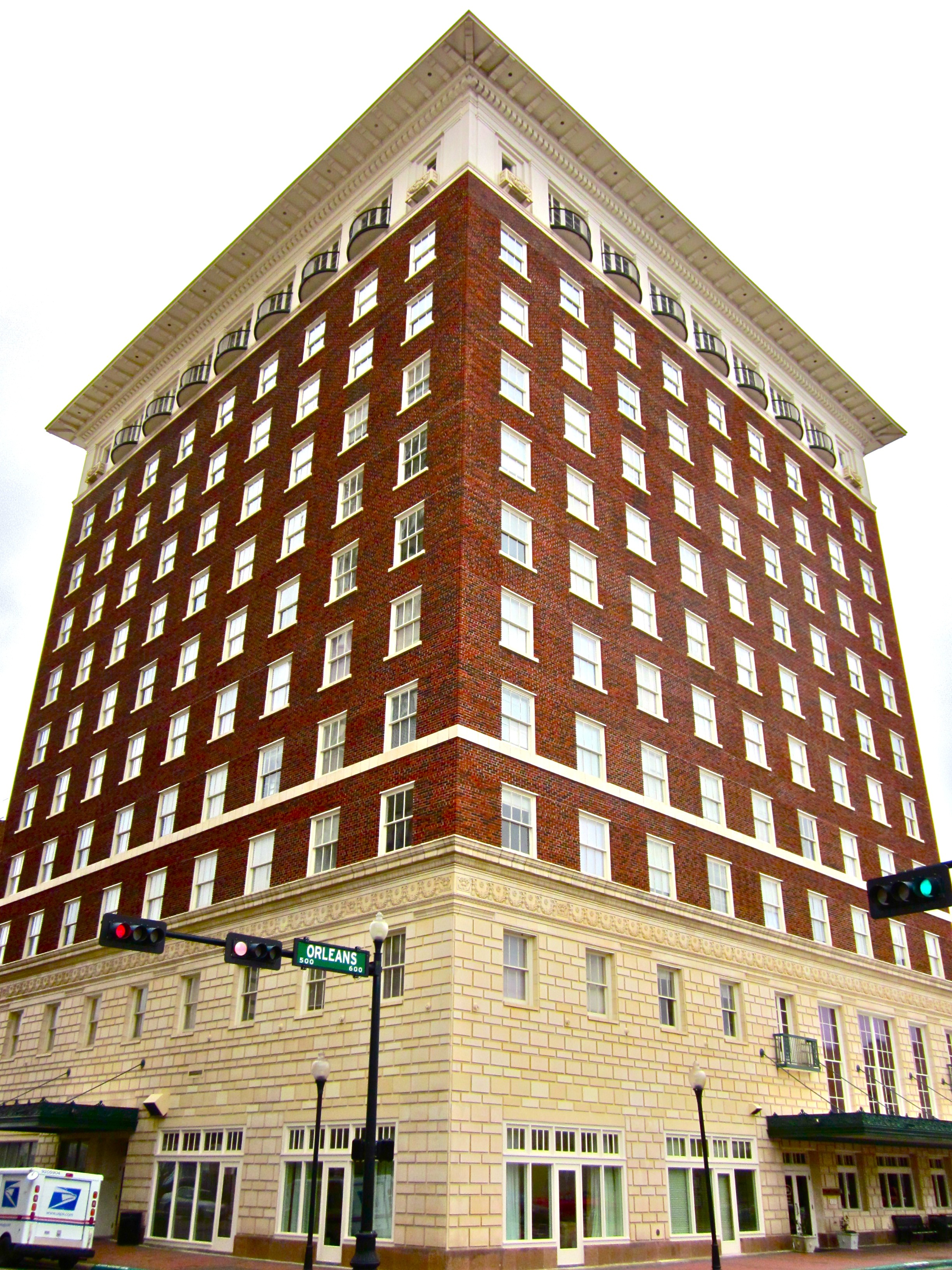
Hotel Beaumont

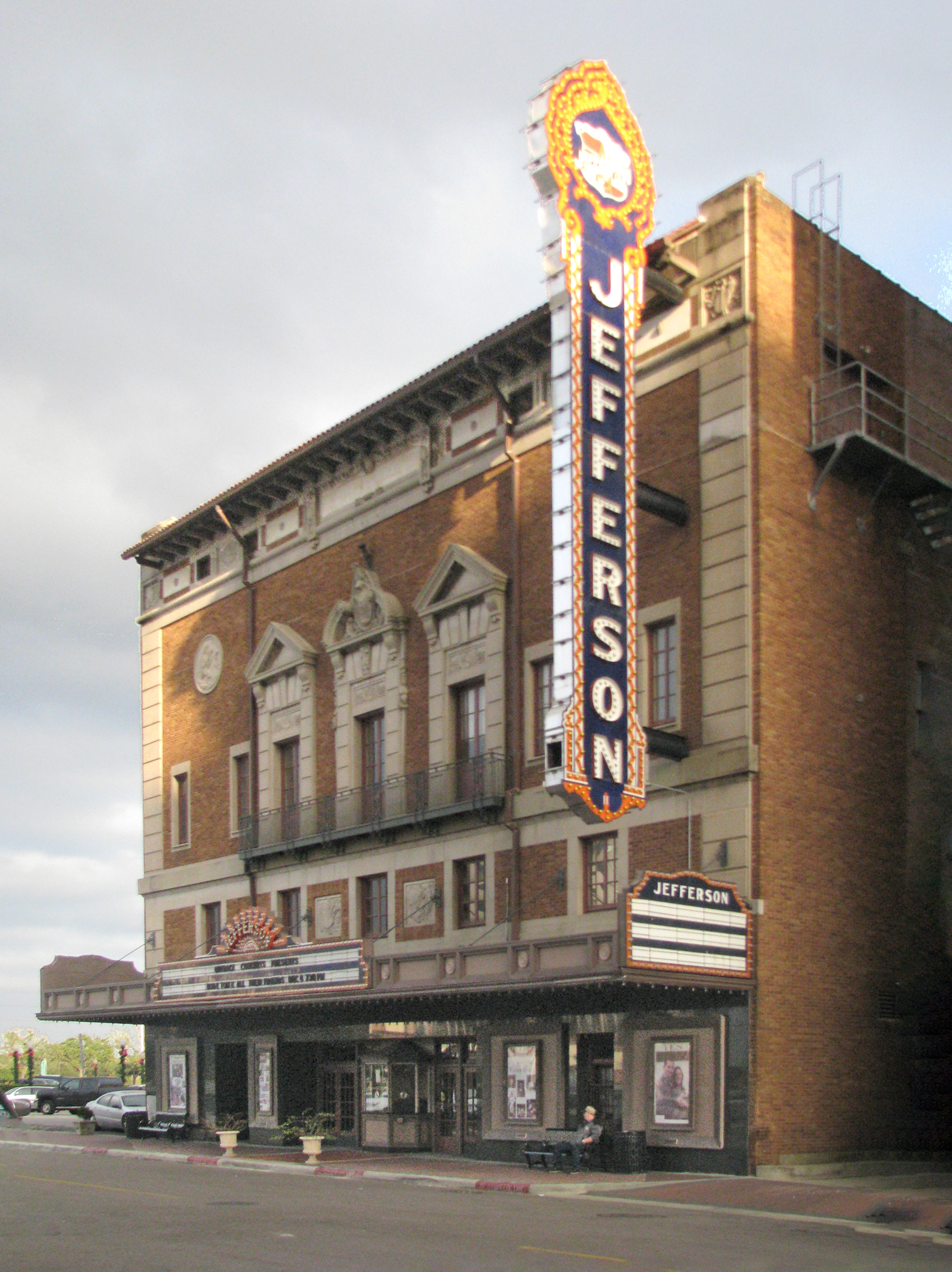
Jefferson Theatre

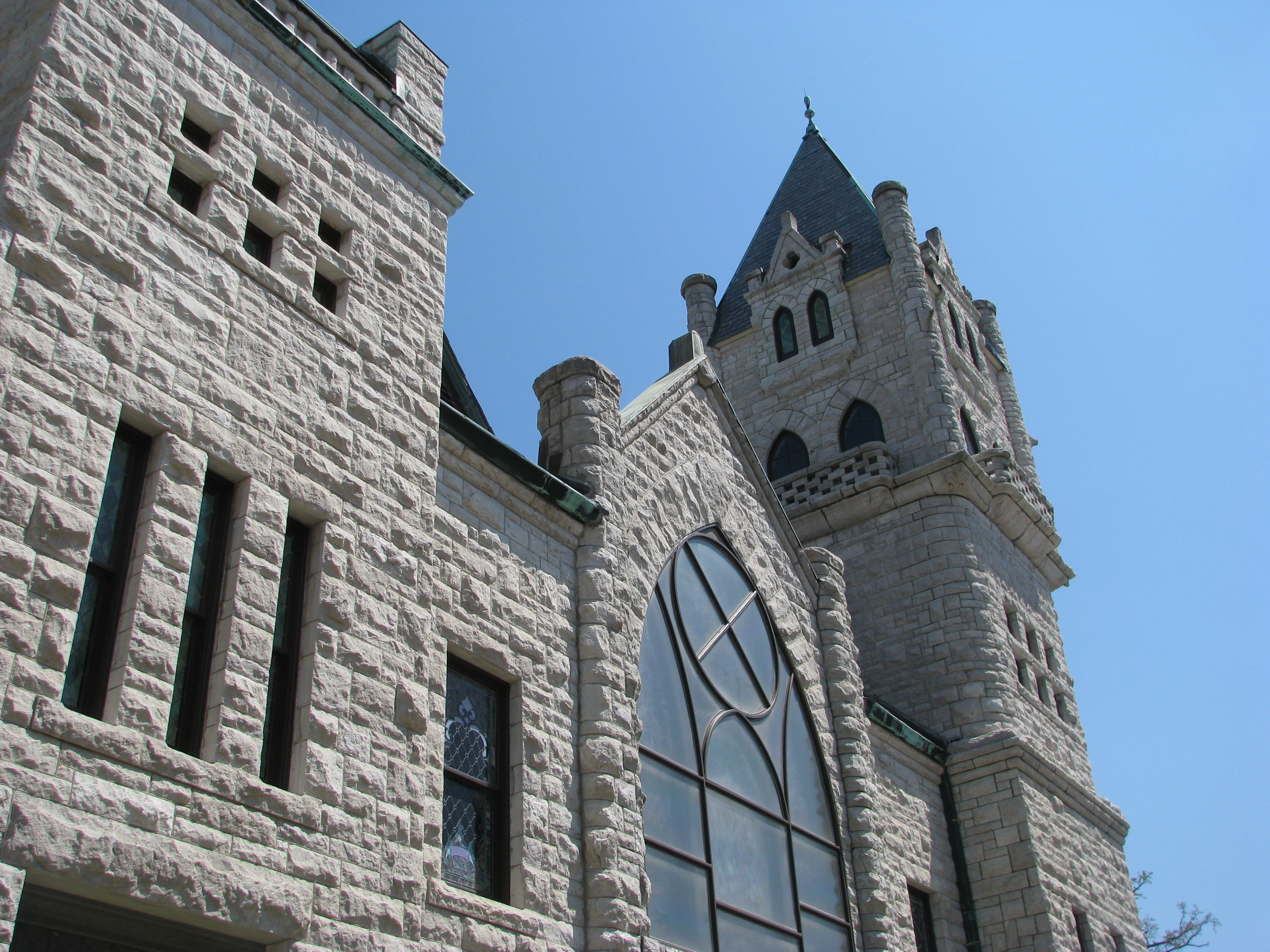
Tyrrell Historical Library

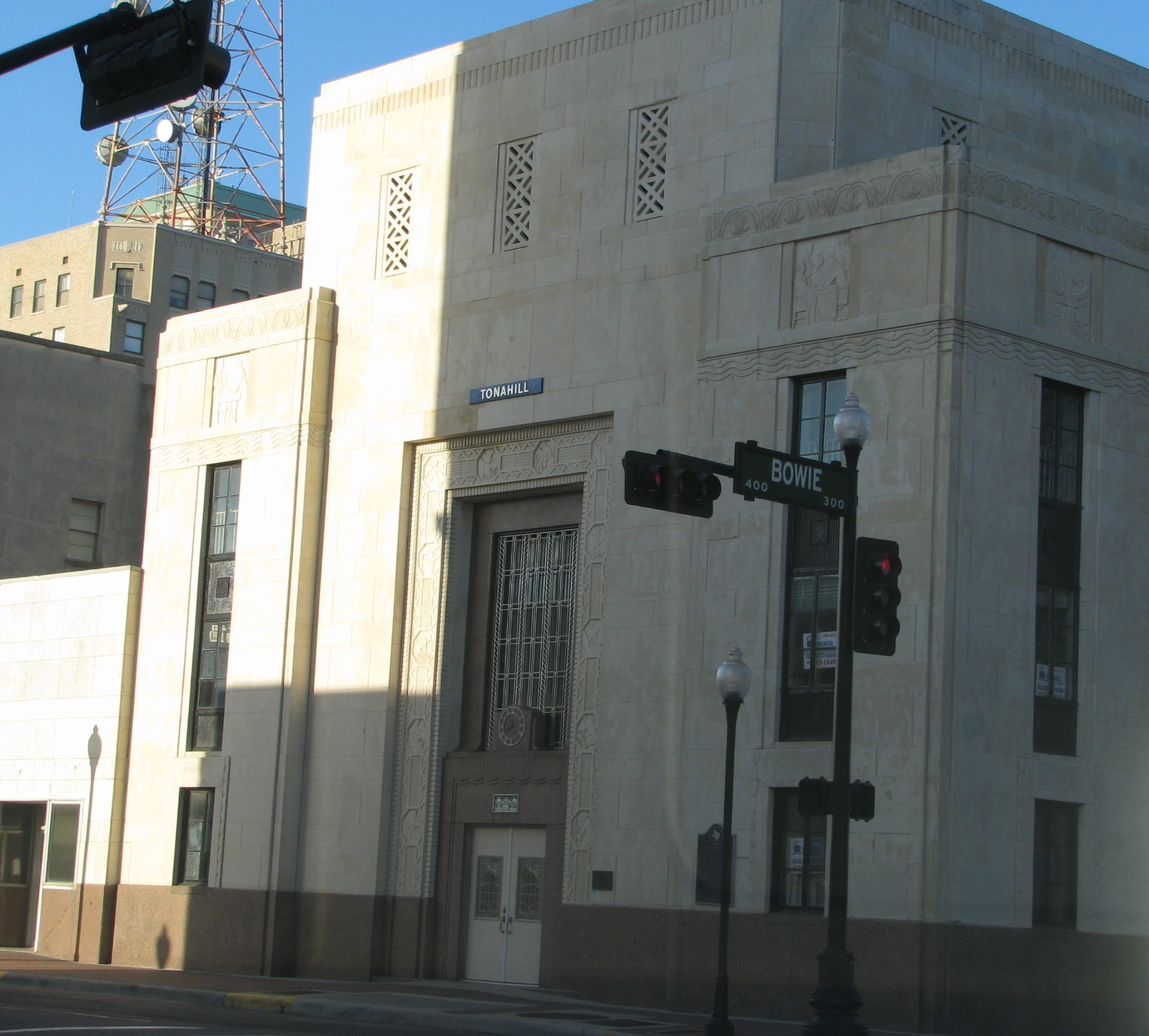
First National Bank Building

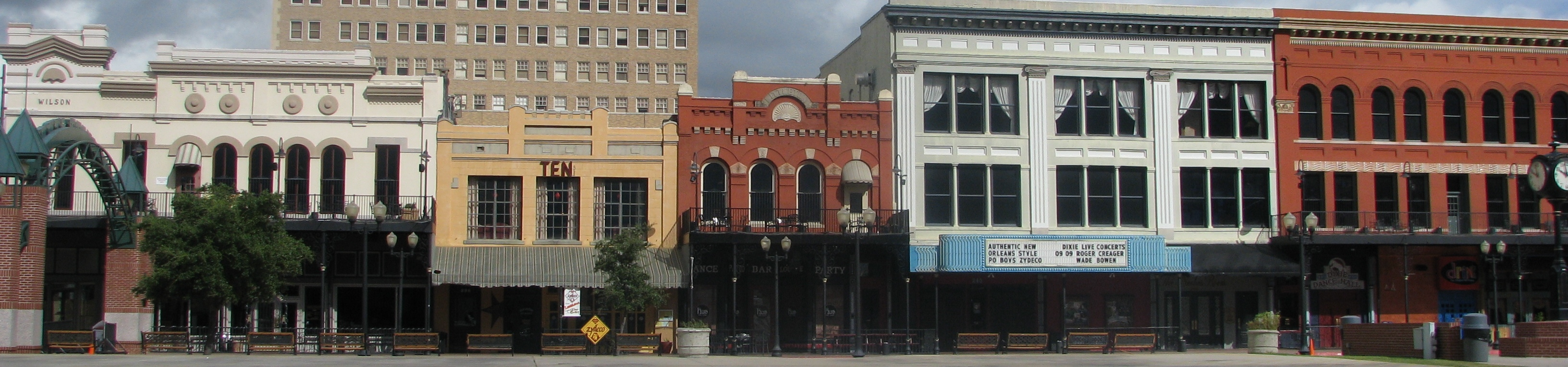
Crockett Street Entertainment Complex

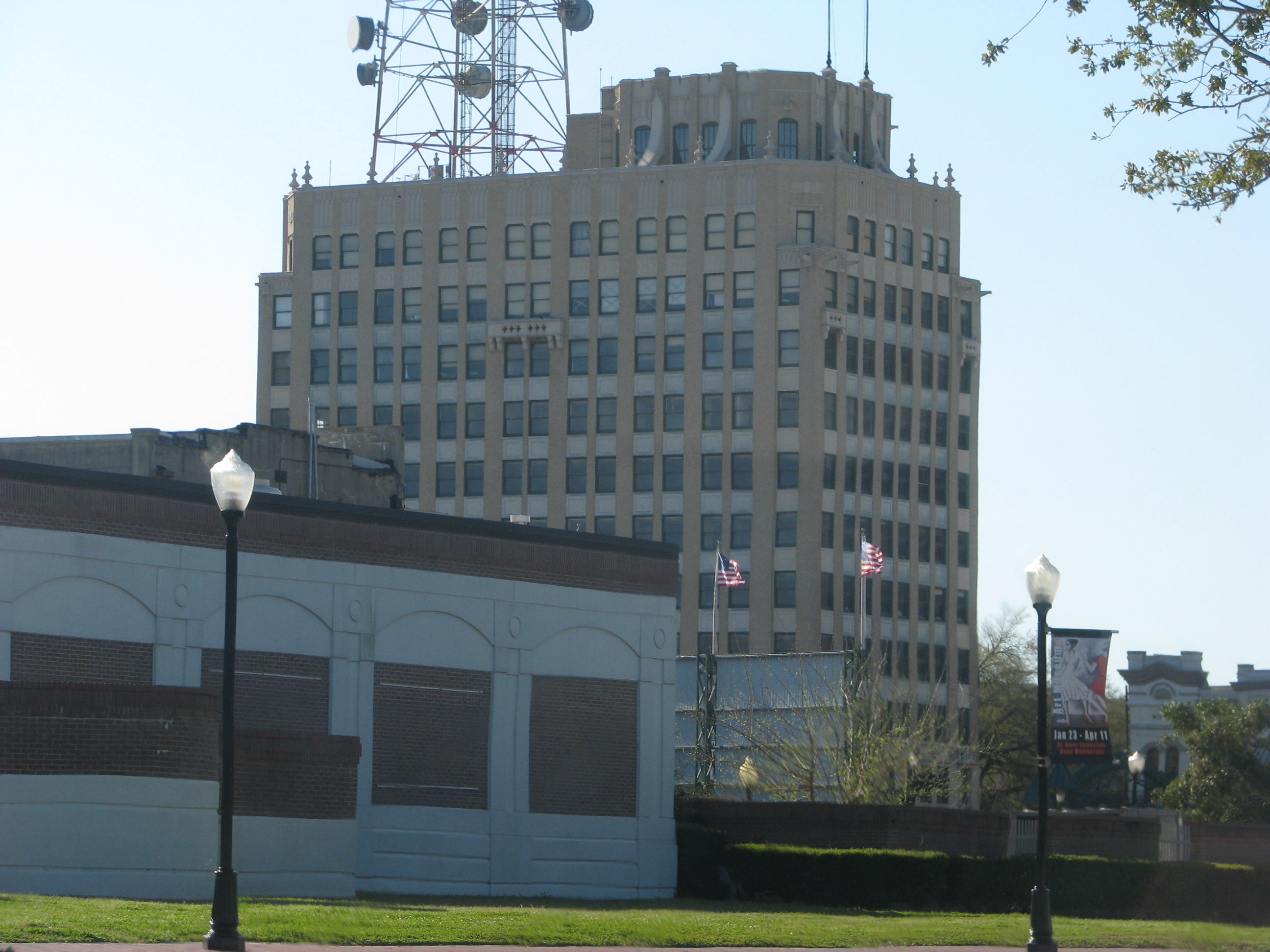
Goodhue Building exterior

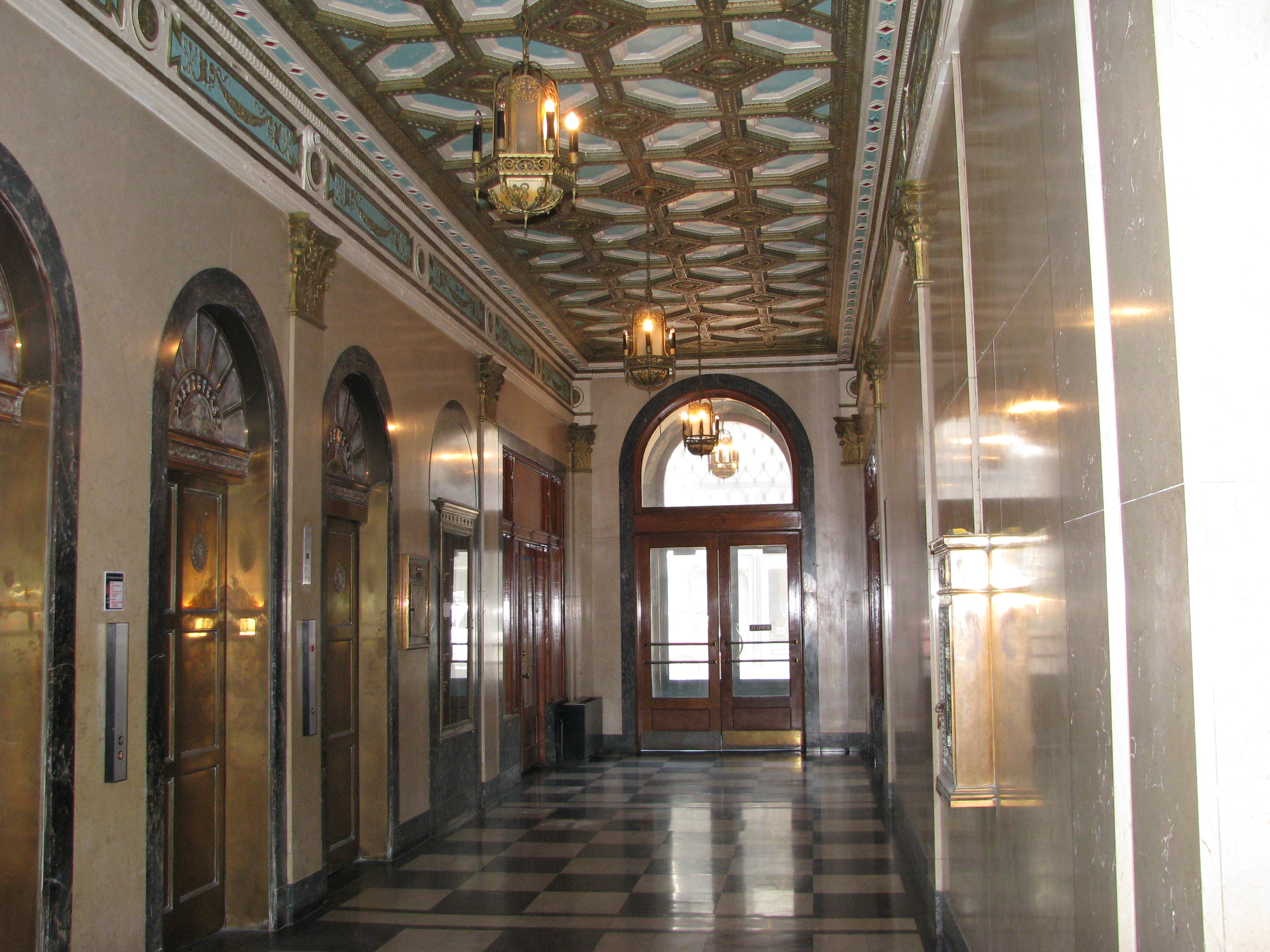
Goodhue Building lobby

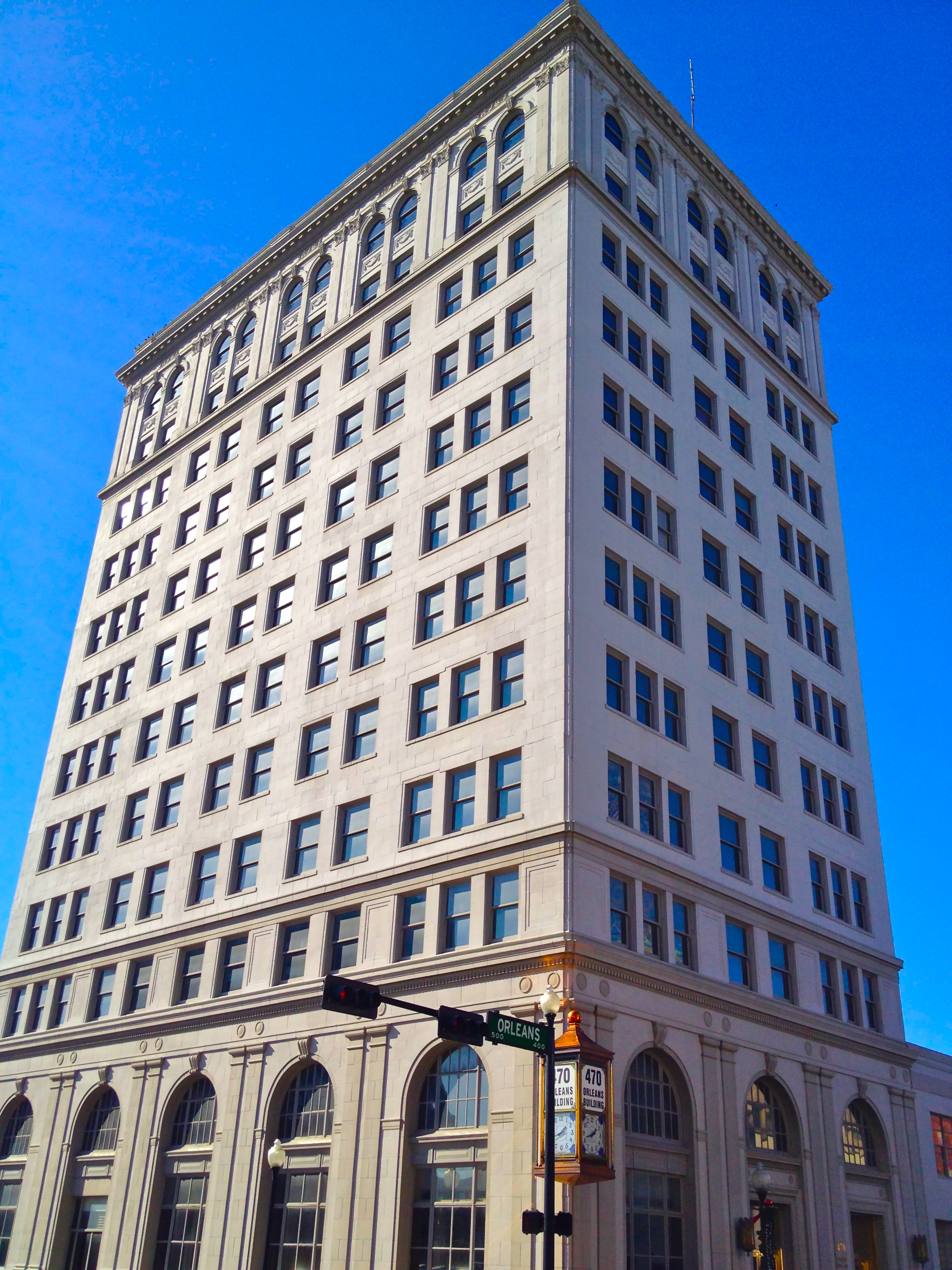
Orleans Building

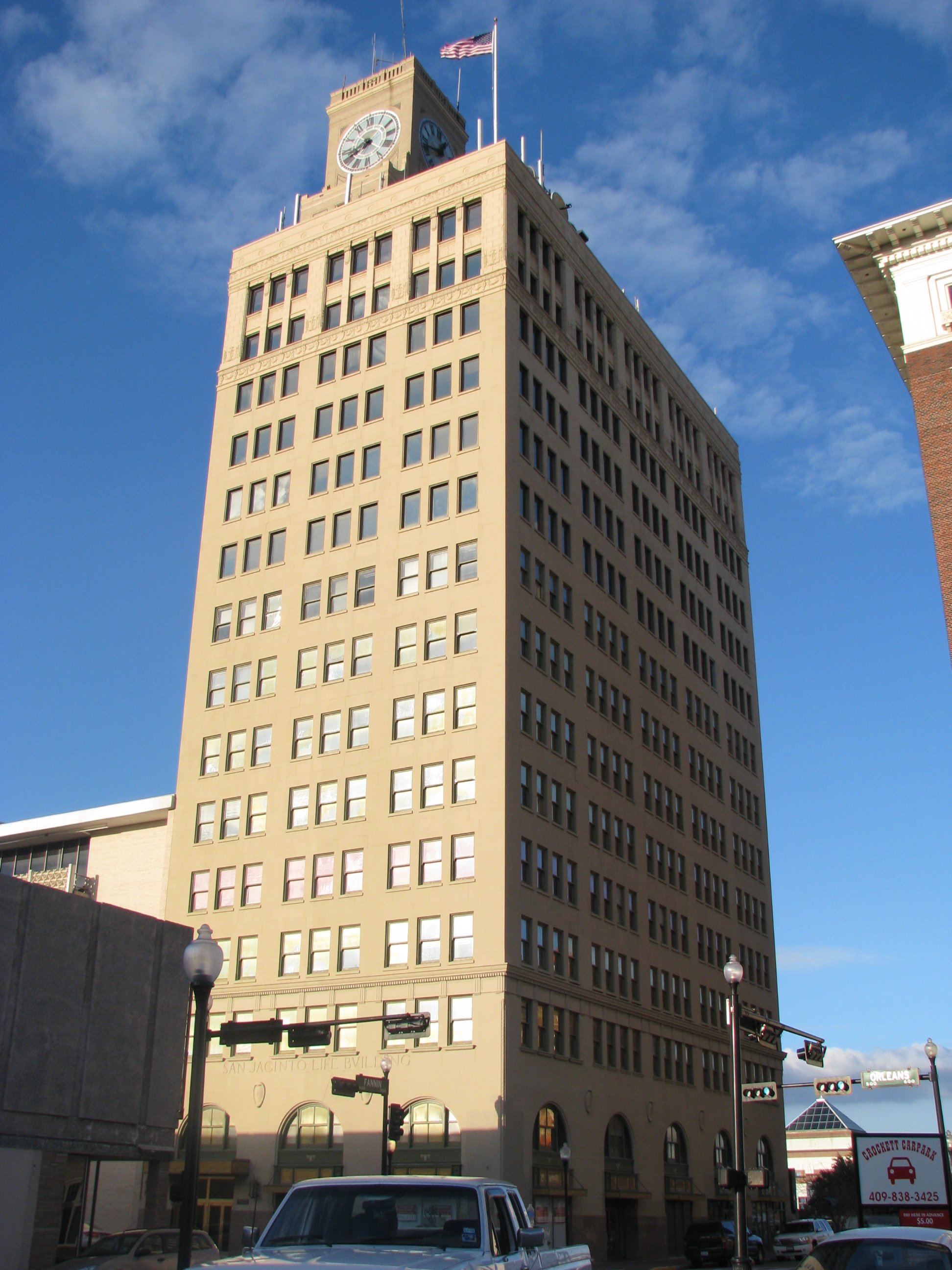
San Jacinto Building

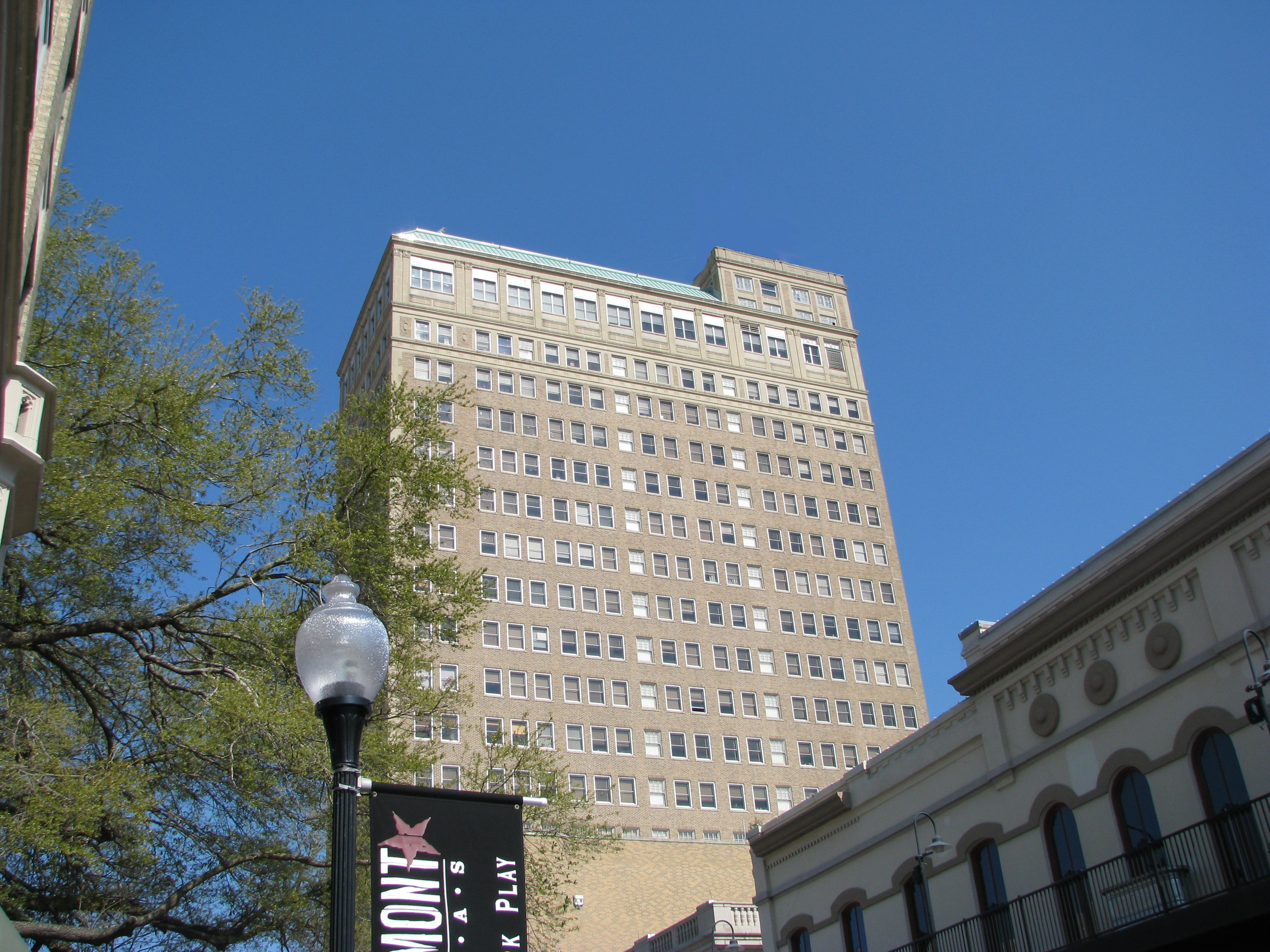
Edson Hotel

== Major Non-Contributing Buildings ==
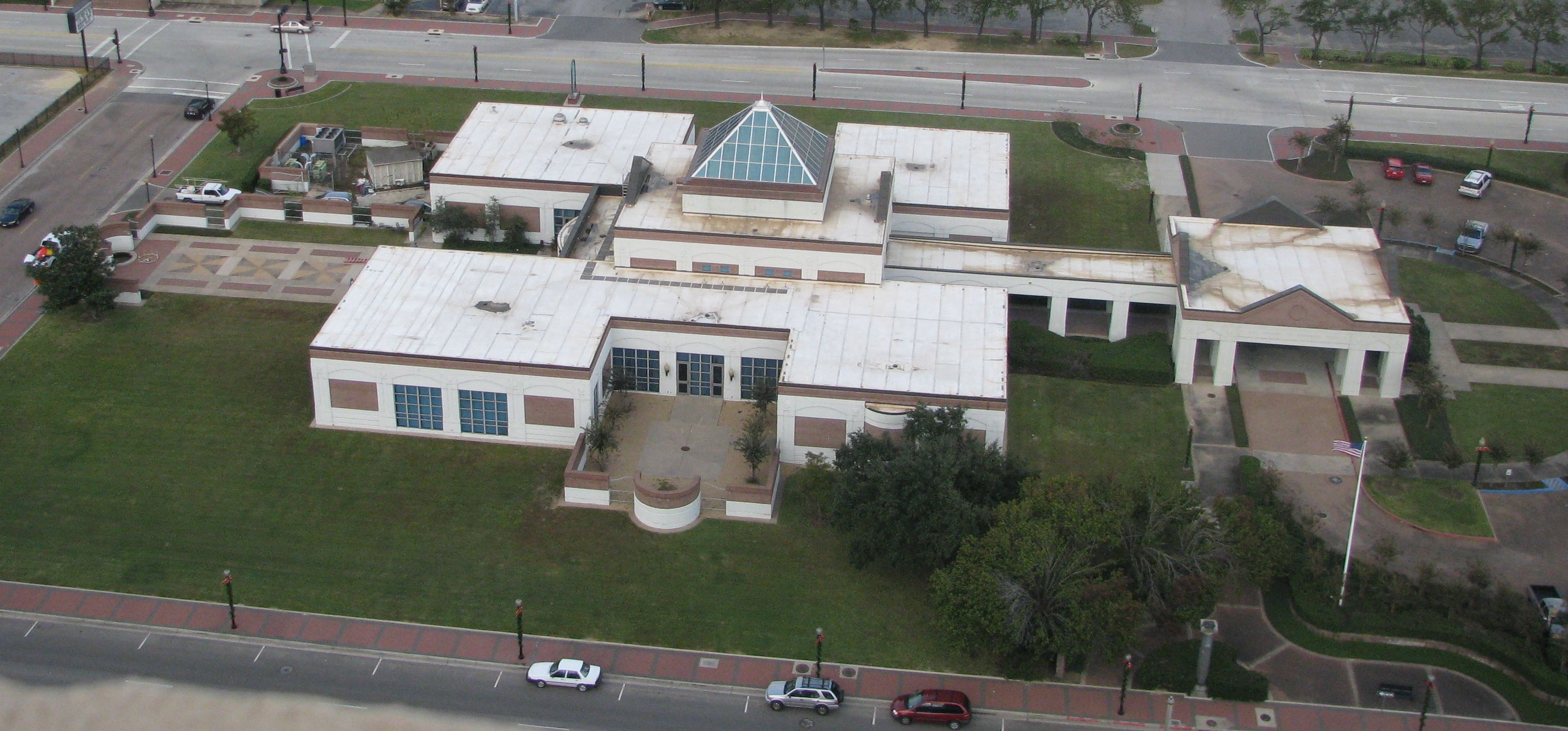
Art Museum of Southeast Texas

- Art Museum of Southeast Texas

== See also ==
- National Register of Historic Places listings in Jefferson County, Texas
- Recorded Texas Historic Landmarks in Jefferson County
