= First National Bank Building (Beaumont, Texas) =

Building in Beaumont, Texas

- First National Bank / Tonahill
- U.S. Historic district – Contributing property
- Recorded Texas Historic Landmark
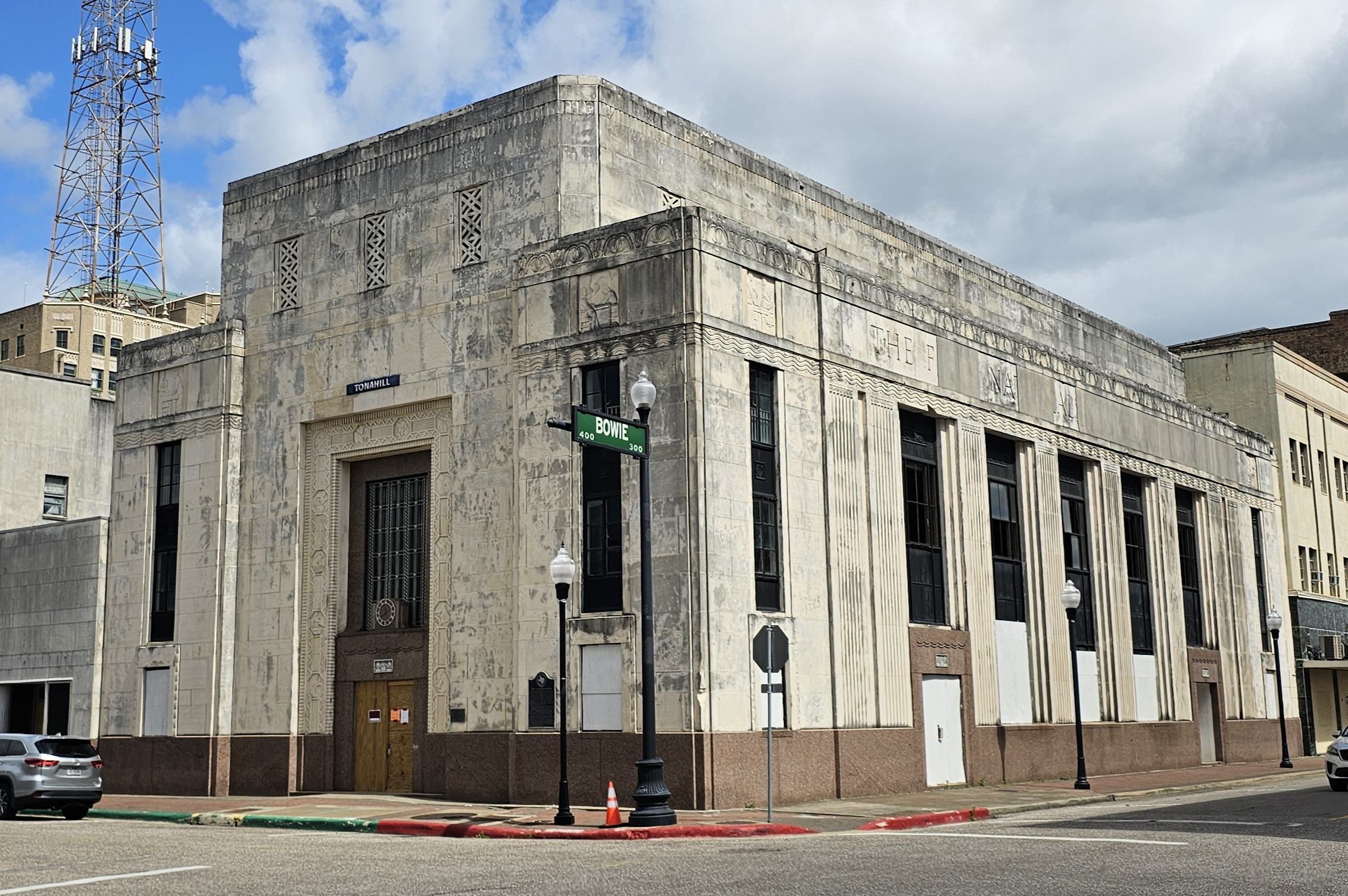
- The building in 2024
- Location: 495 Orleans St., Beaumont, Texas
- Coordinates: 30°04′58″N 94°05′57″W
- Area: less than one acre
- Built: 1936-1937
- Architect: F.W. Steinman & Son, Fred C. Stone
- Architectural style: Art Deco
- Part of: Beaumont Commercial District (ID78002959)
- RTHL No.: 10521

Significant dates
- Designated CP: April 14, 1978
- Designated RTHL: 1989

The First National Bank Building in downtown Beaumont, Texas was built in 1937 and is an excellent example of Art Deco architecture. The building is four stories tall and decorated with reliefs of workers and business people designed by Beaumont-based sculptor Matchett Herring Coe.

== Photo gallery ==
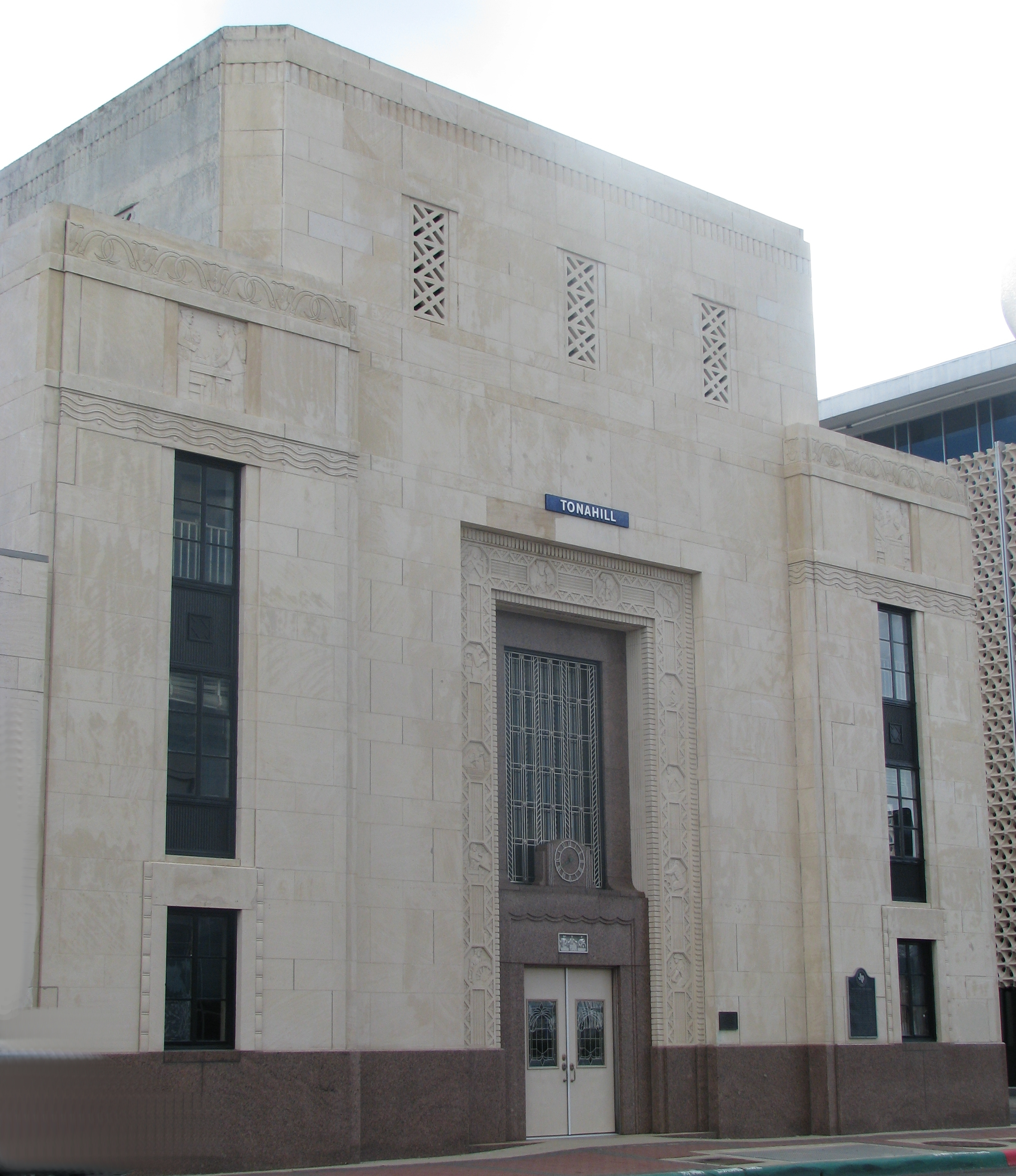

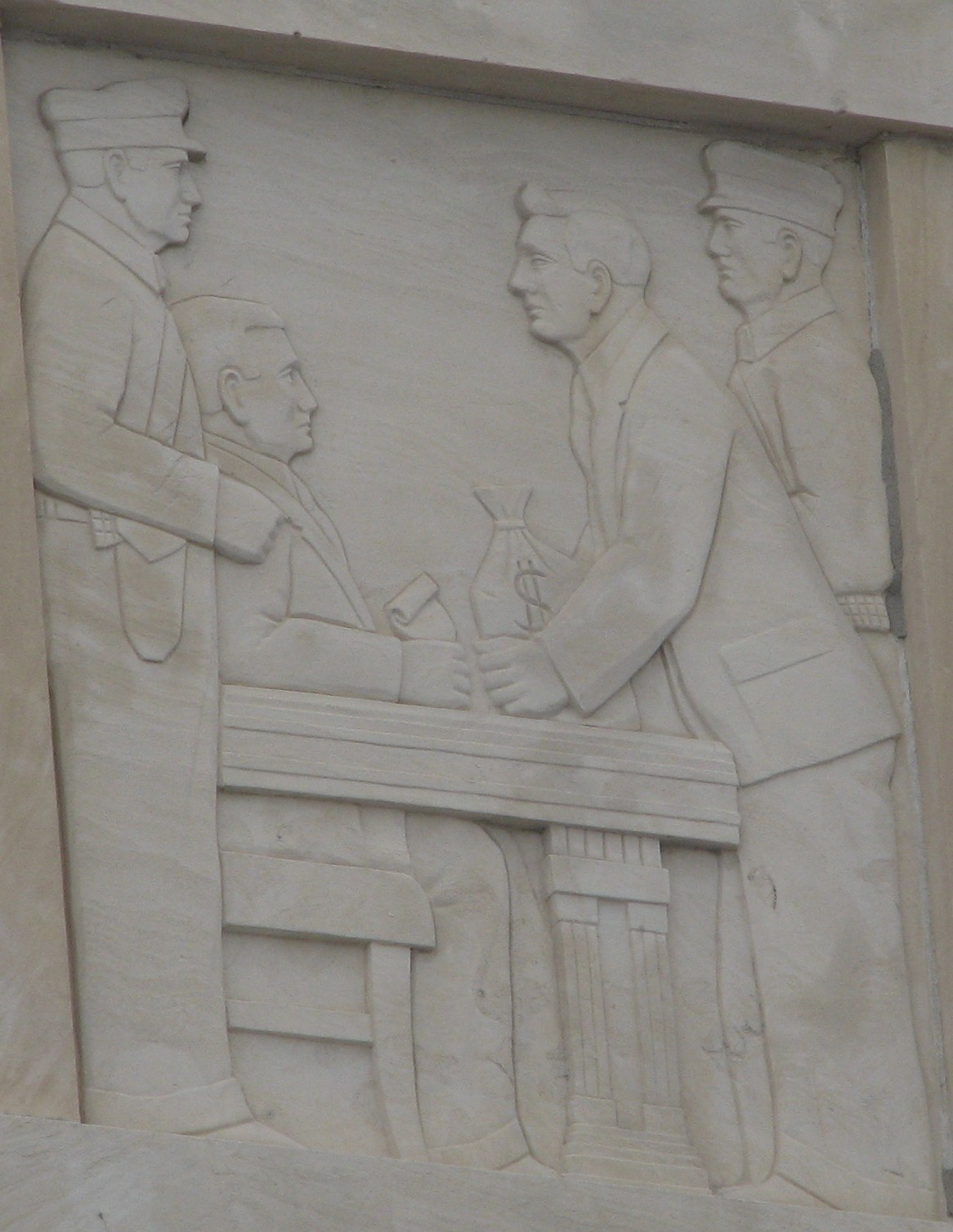
One of the many sculpted panels

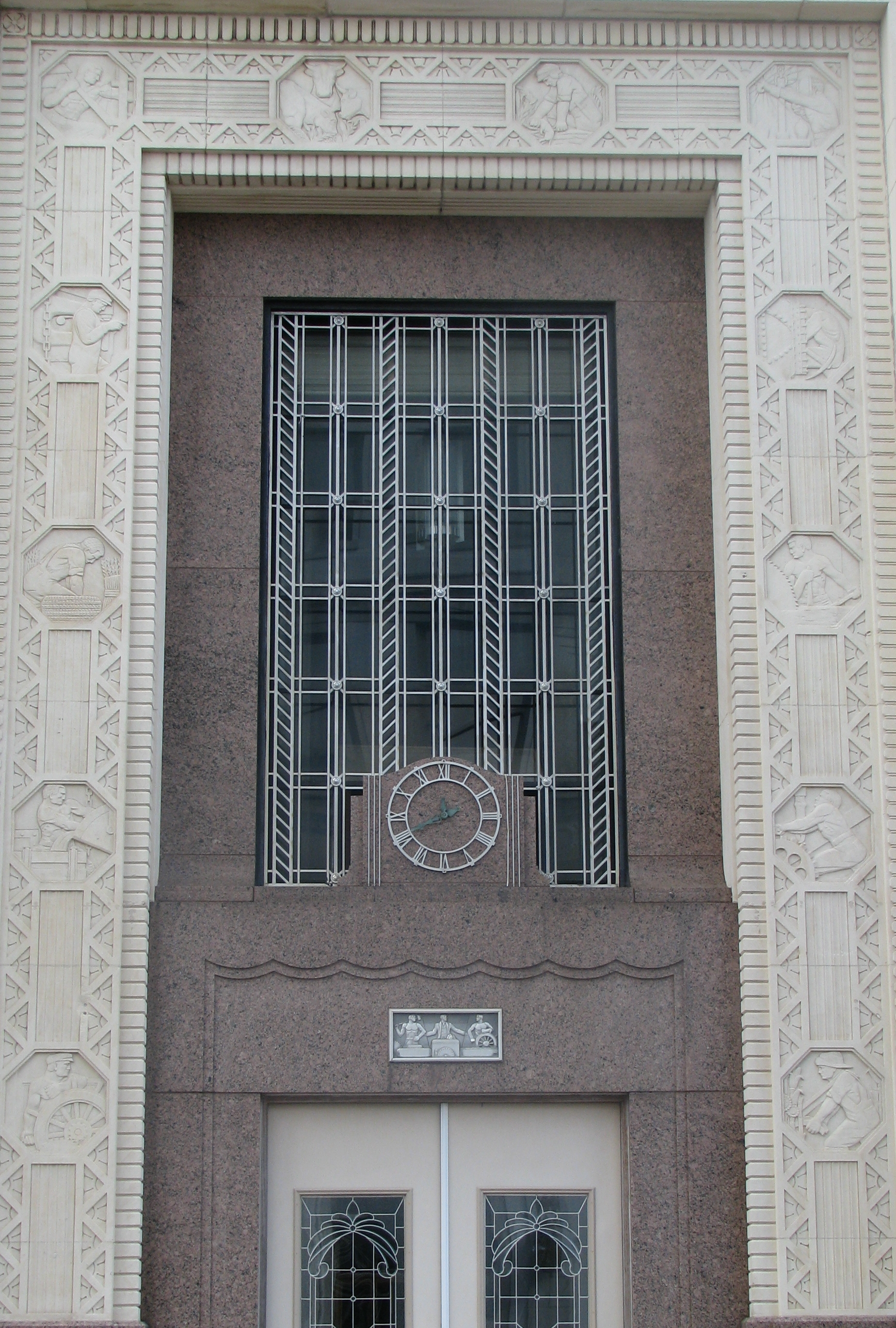
Detail around the entrance

== See also ==
- National Register of Historic Places listings in Jefferson County, Texas
- Recorded Texas Historic Landmarks in Jefferson County
