= Goodhue Building =

- U.S. Historic district – Contributing property
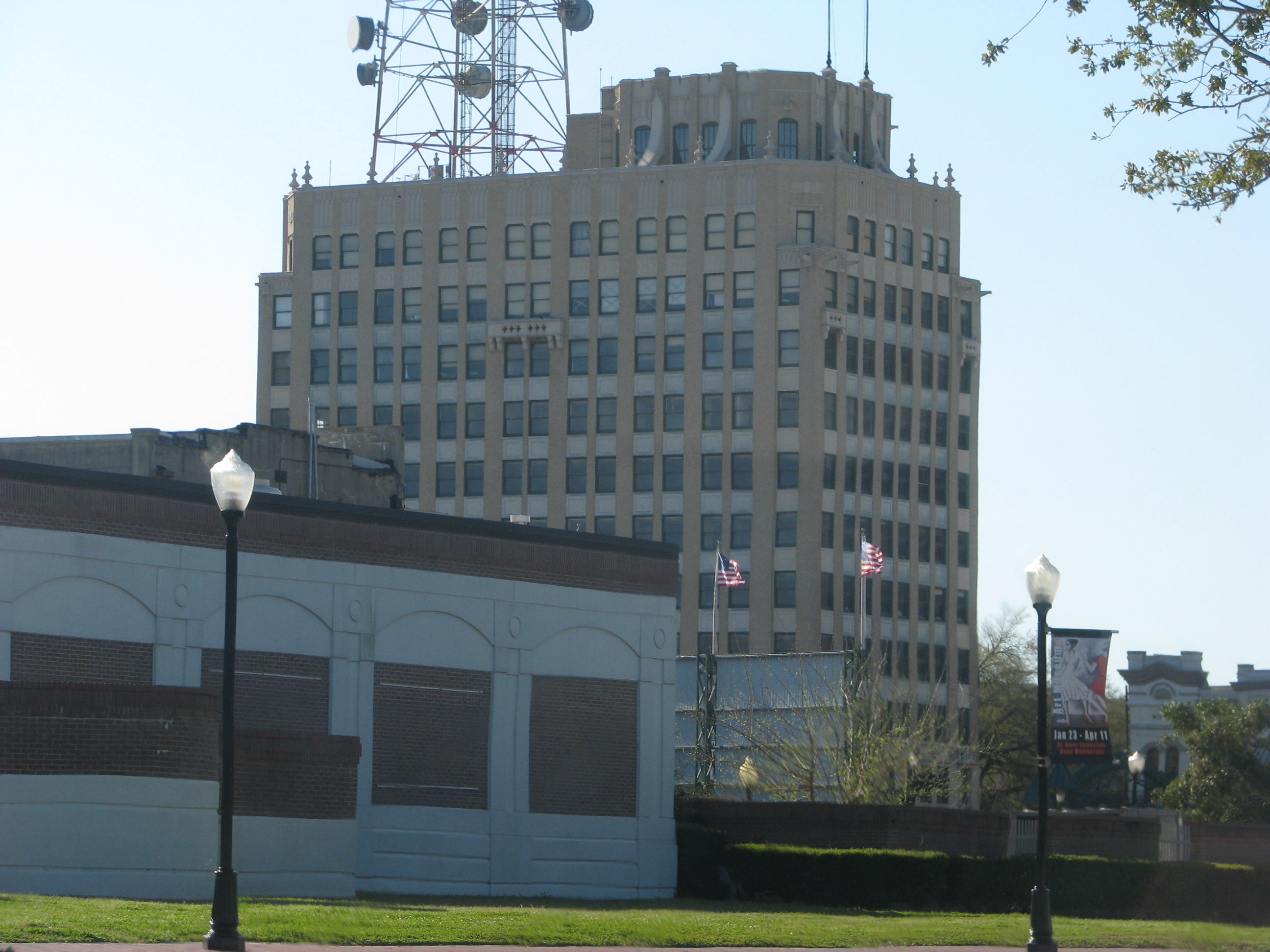

- Location within Texas Location within the United States
- Location: 398 Pearl St., Beaumont, Texas
- Coordinates: 30°5′2.5″N 94°5′57″W
- Area: less than one acre
- Built: 1926
- Architect: Tisdale & Stone
- Architectural style: Gothic Revival, Romanesque Revival
- Part of: Beaumont Commercial District (ID78002959)
- Designated CP: April 14, 1978

The Goodhue Building is an office building in the downtown area of Beaumont, Texas. Built in 1926 by Forrest Goodhue, the building has 190 offices and is one of the most decorative structures in the area. The building has 11 stories and a penthouse. The building was built in a Tudor gothic style by Tisdale, Stone & Pinson, with an asymmetric penthouse.

== Photo gallery ==
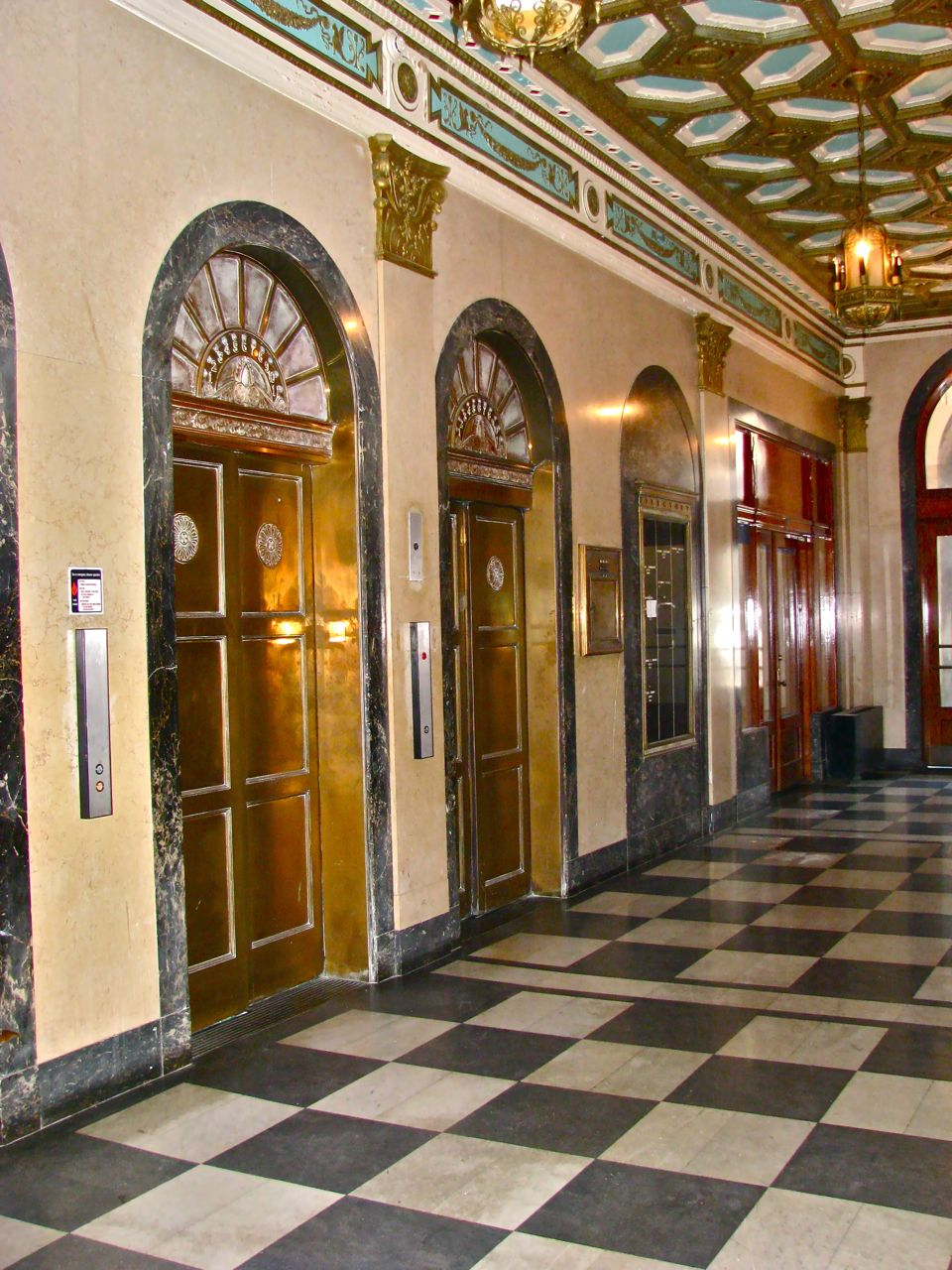
The Lobby

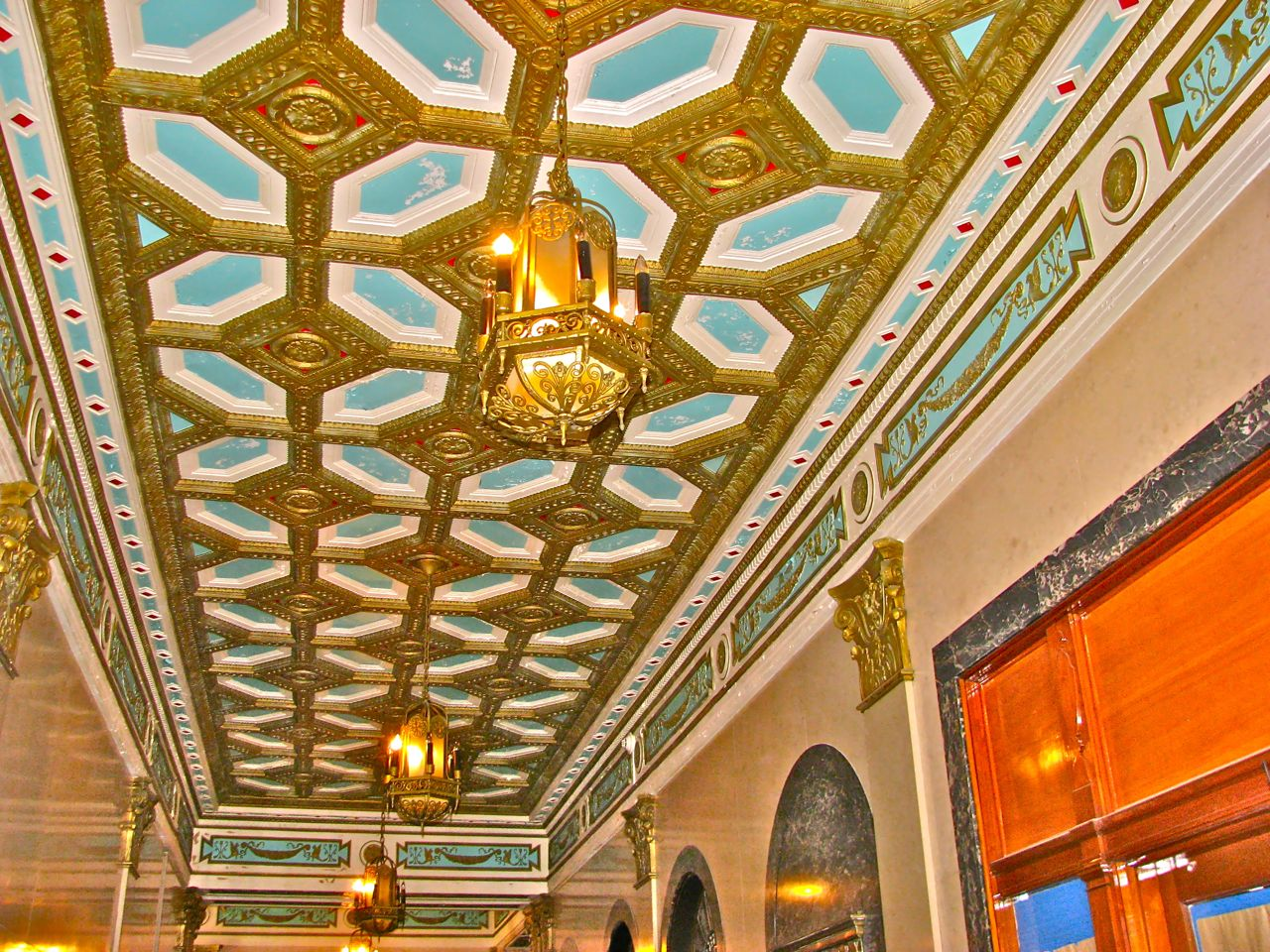
The detailed lobby ceiling.

== See also ==
- National Register of Historic Places listings in Jefferson County, Texas
