= Alexander Calder (disambiguation) =

Alexander Calder (1898–1976) was an American sculptor and inventor of the mobile sculpture.

Alexander Calder may also refer to:

- Alexander Milne Calder (1846–1923), American sculptor, father of Alexander Stirling Calder
- Alexander Stirling Calder (1870–1945), American sculptor, father of Alexander Calder
- Alexander Calder (mayor) (1806–1853), first mayor of Beaumont, Texas

Other people

- Alex Calder (1989–2026), Canadian musician
