= Beaumont Art League =

- Location within Texas
- Established: May 1, 1943
- Location: 2675 Gulf Street, Beaumont, Texas, USA 77703
- Coordinates: 30.08114°N 94.127908°W
- Type: Art museum
- Collection size: 120
- President: Anastasia Fontenot-Cormier
- Curator: Dennis Kiel
- Owner: Board of directors
- Parking: On site (no charge)
- Website: beaumontartleague.org

The Beaumont Art League (BAL) is the oldest non-profit art organization in the Beaumont, Texas, USA, area. The BAL hosts art exhibitions, juried shows, and arts education for adults and children. It also maintains a permanent collection of art and art objects, primarily by local artists.

== History ==
The league was founded in 1943 by a group of artists meeting weekly at the studio of Robert Stapp who decided to form a working group of painters to foster and stimulate fine arts and crafts in the Sabine area. Founding members included Will-Amelia Sterns Price and Tom Tierney. By 1944, the group moved to the YWCA and held its first art exhibition. It continued to hold annual membership exhibitions, traveling exhibitions, workshops, lectures, and summer art colonies taught by such accomplished national artists as Frederic Taubes and Jacob Getlar Smith.

In 1949, the league raised the money to rent a house and formed the Beaumont Art Museum, now the Art Museum of Southeast Texas, which opened in 1950. The league organized many of the museum's activities over the coming years. In 1956, Colonel Sanford Perry Brown and his wife donated the money for a building (the Brown Gallery) at the Fairgrounds in North Beaumont. In the late 1950s and early 1960s, the league moved several times while the museum remained at the Brown Gallery. The Browns donated funds for a second building in 1967 named the Scurlock Gallery. The league moved back to these buildings in 1968 and has remained there since. The museum expanded several times into other local buildings until finding its home in downtown Beaumont in 1987.

In 1962, the league held the first Tri-State Exhibition, bringing in art from around Louisiana, Texas and Mississippi. In 1998, this became the BAL National Exhibition, taking in art each year from around the US.
