= Beaumont, Texas =

City in the United States

Beaumont
- City
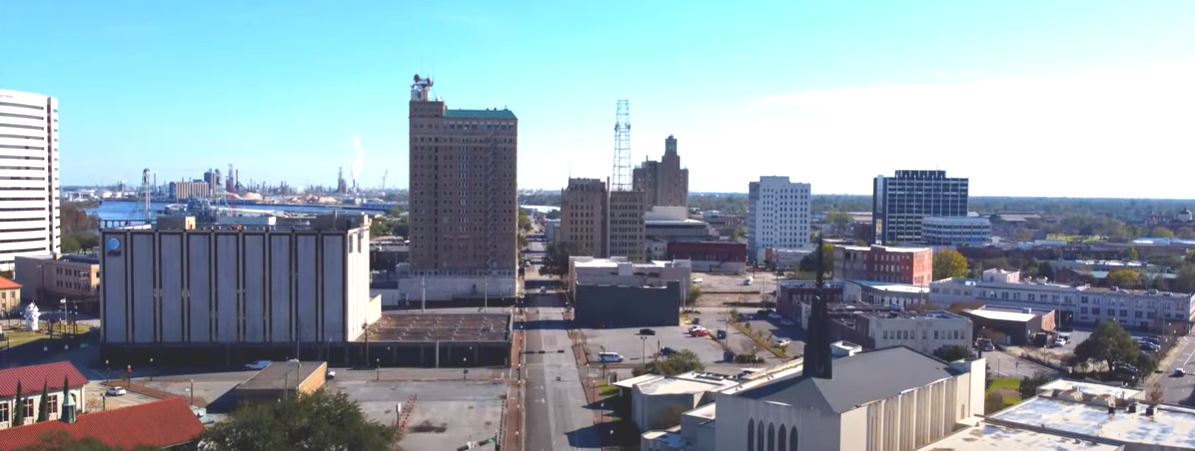
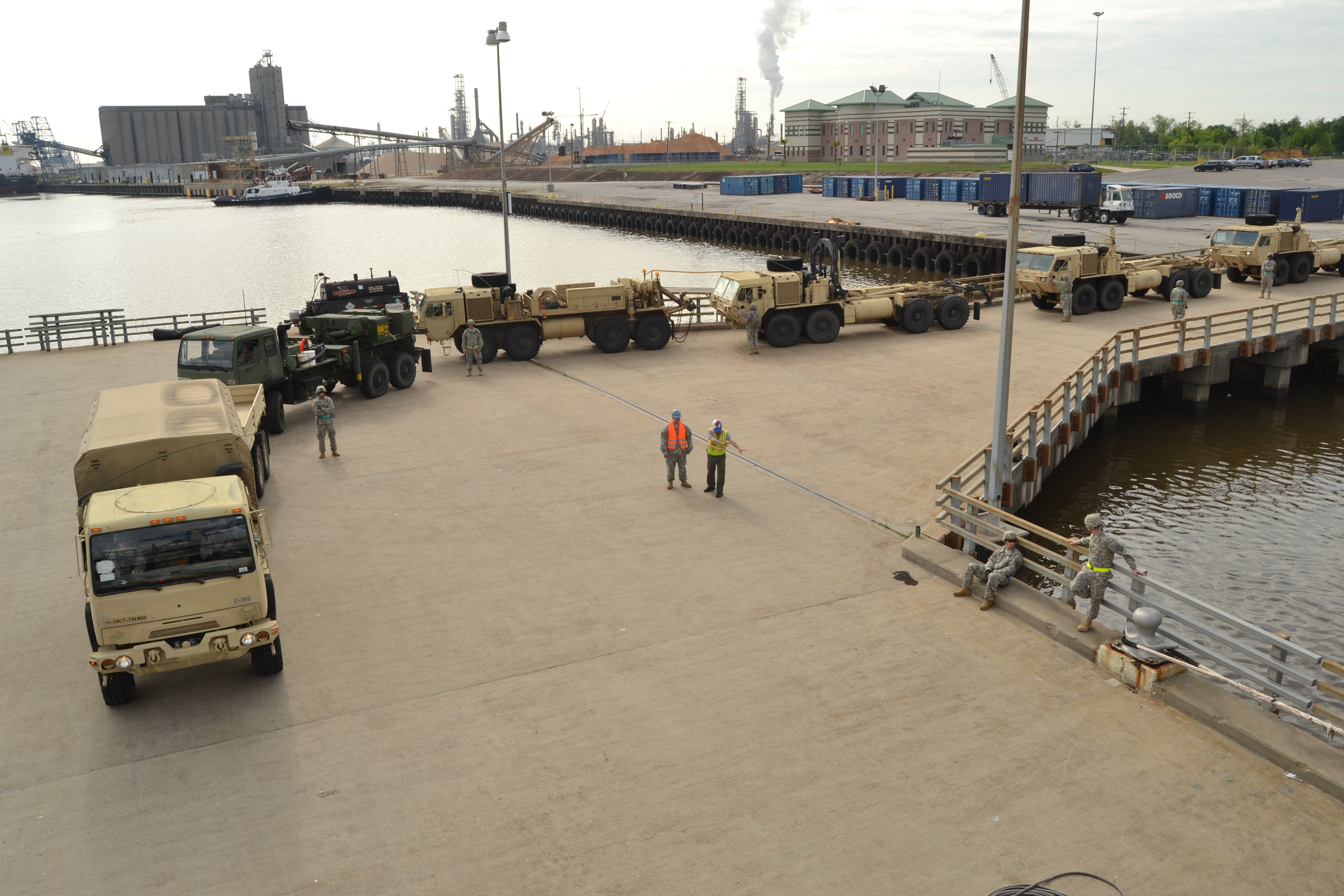
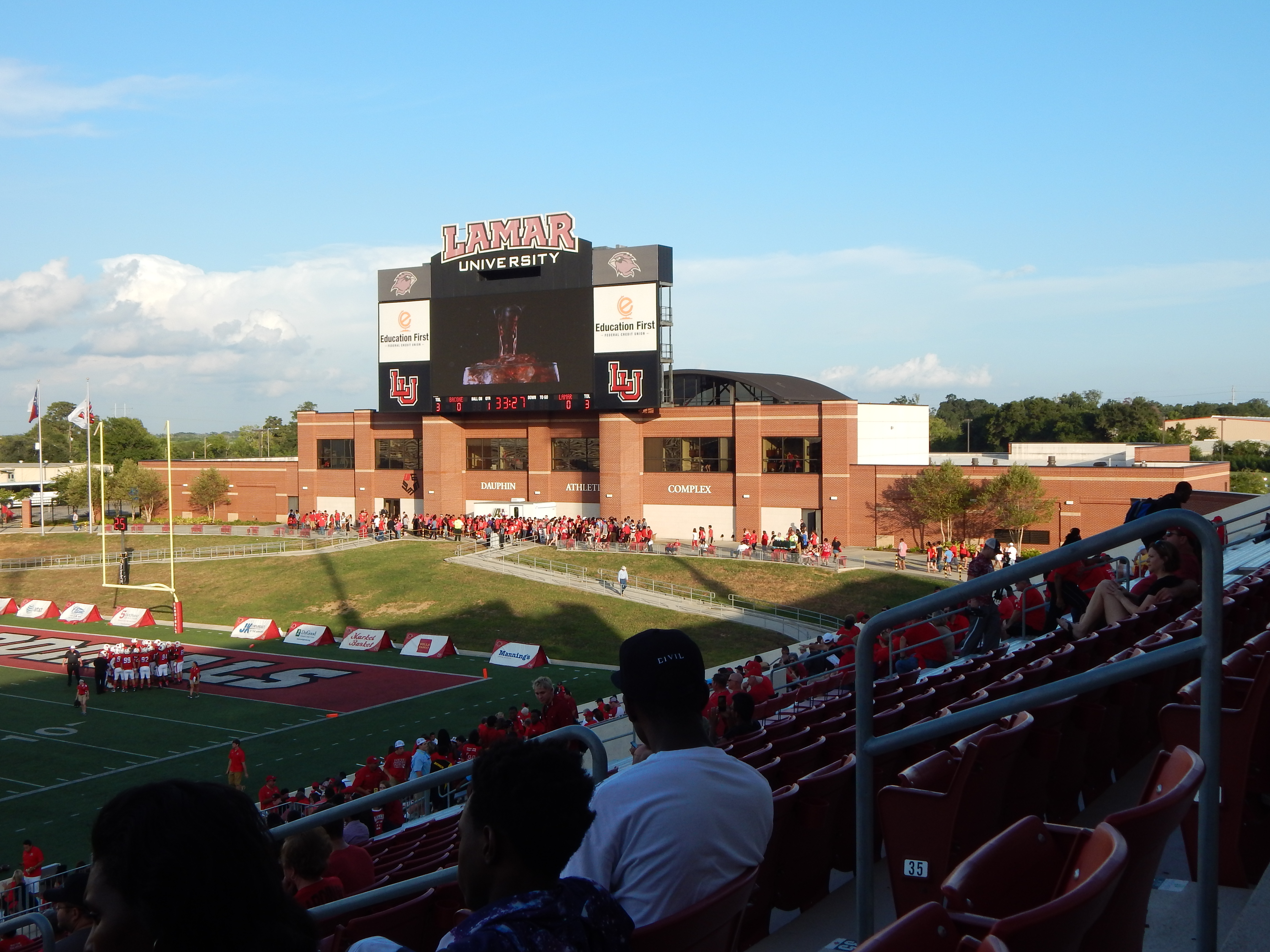
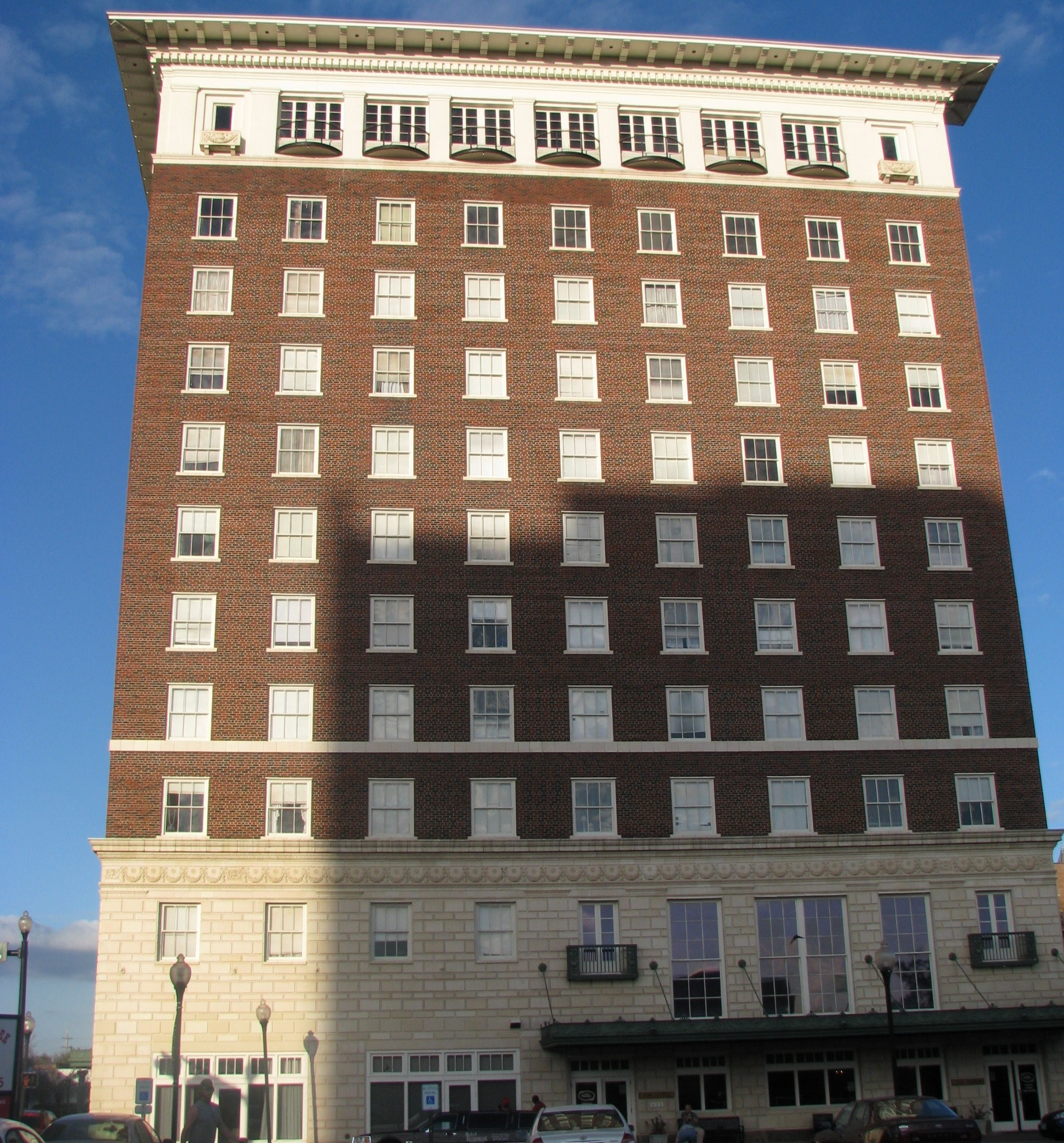
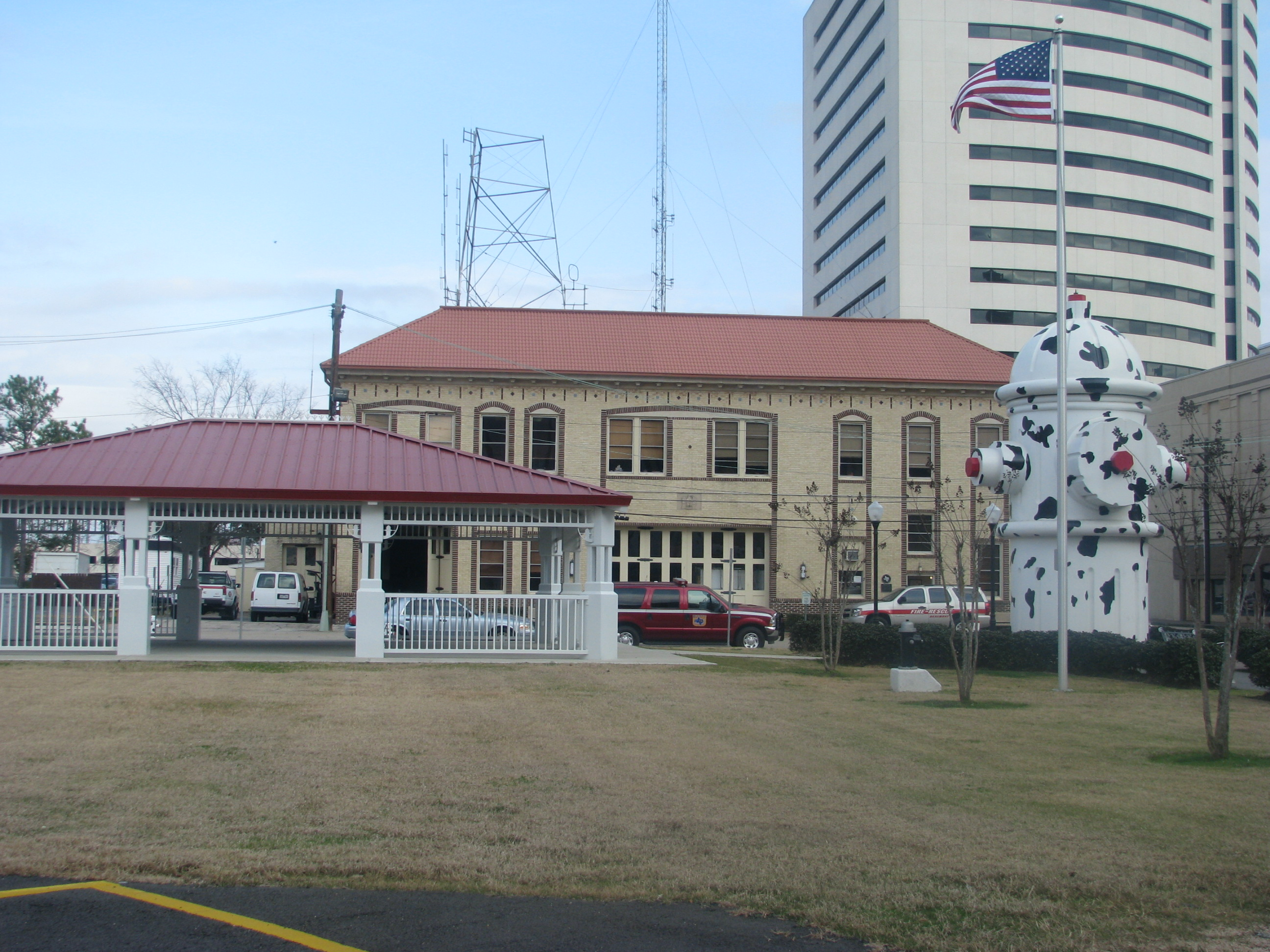
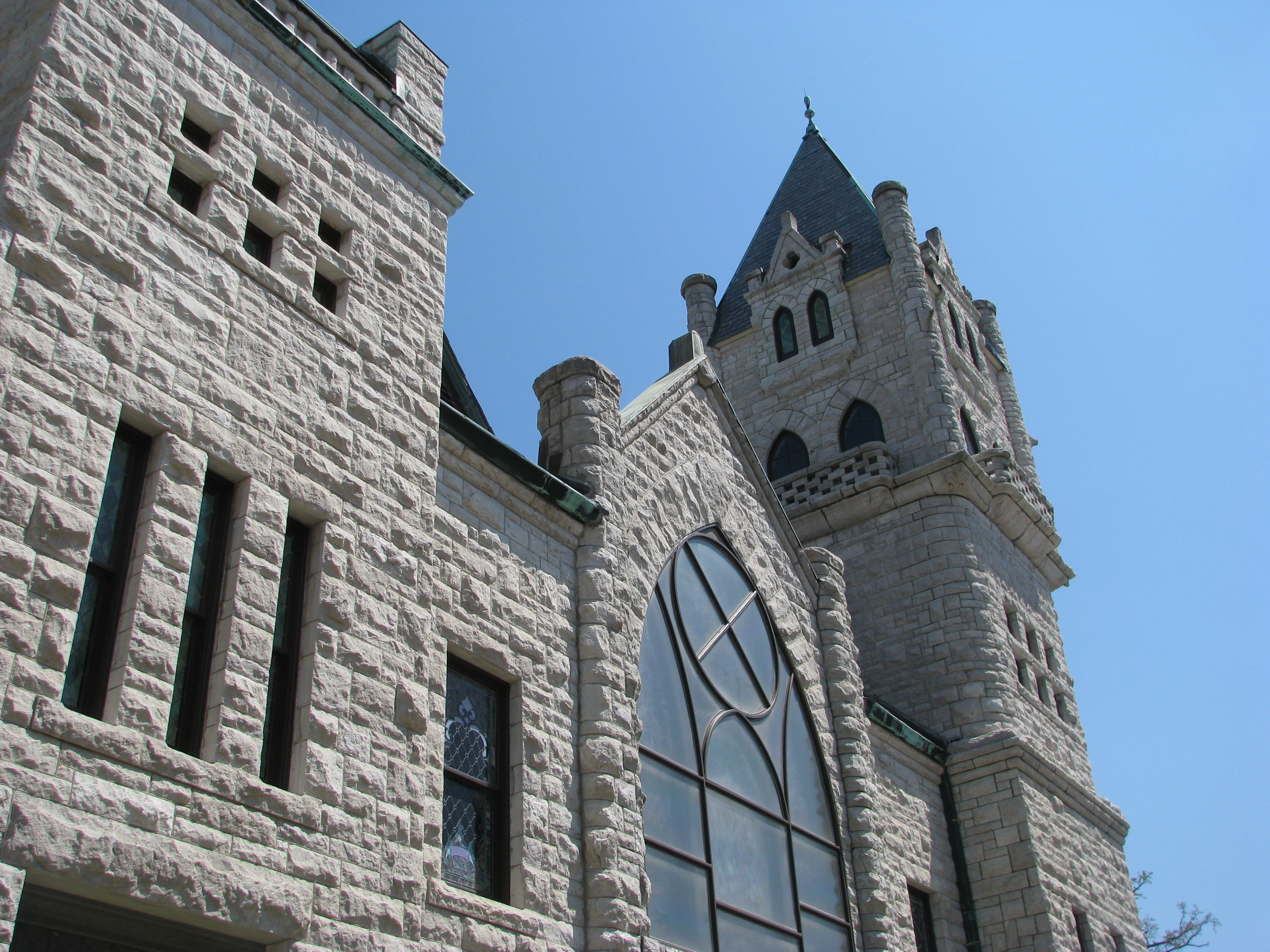
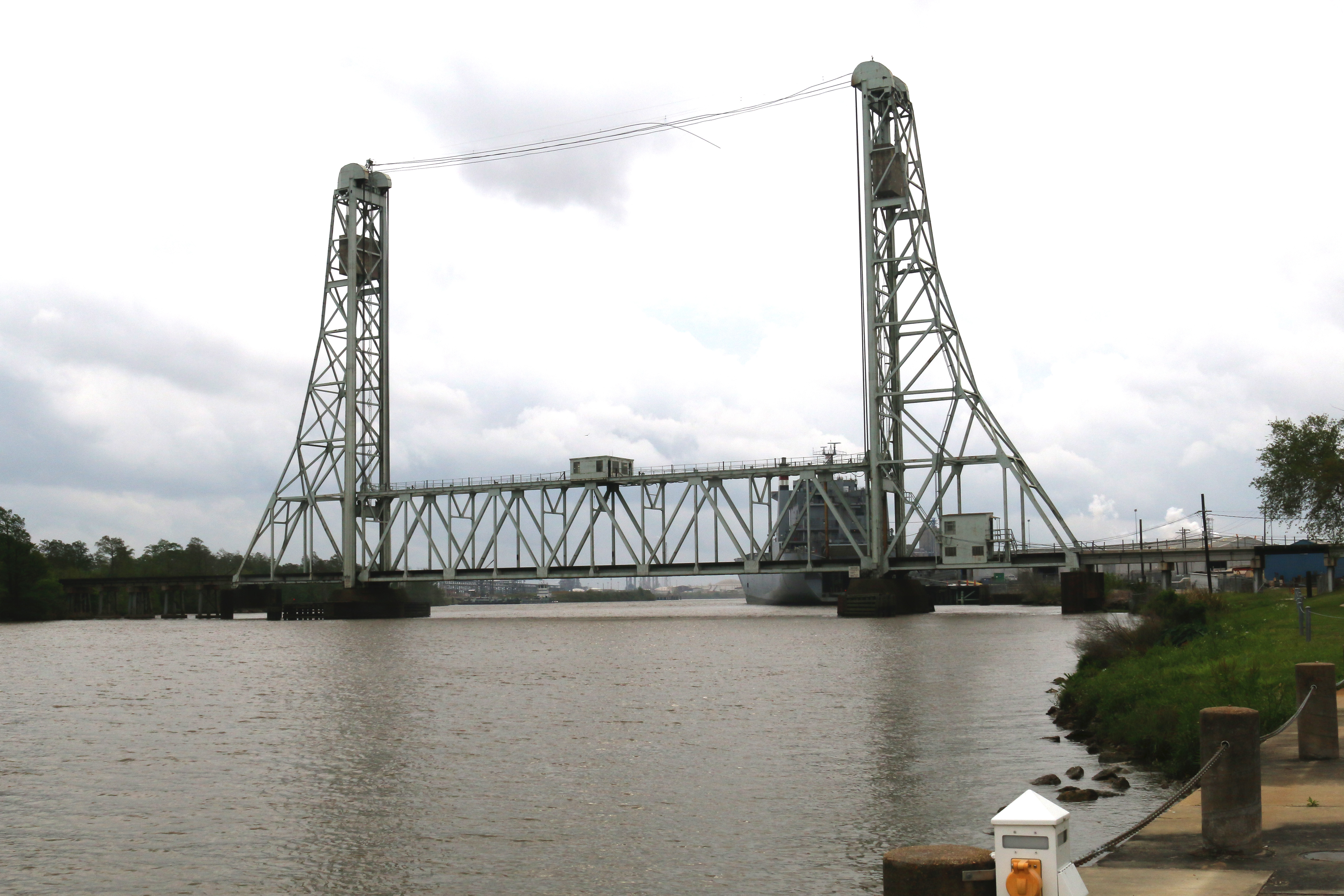
- From top, left to right: Downtown, Port of Beaumont, Lamar University Sports Complex, Hotel Beaumont, Fire Museum of Texas, Tyrrell Historical Library, Crockett Street Entertainment District, Neches River Lift Bridge

- Flag Wordmark
- Interactive map of Beaumont
- Location within Texas Location within the United States Location within North America
- Coordinates: 30°04′48″N 94°07′36″W
- Country: United States
- State: Texas
- County: Jefferson
- Settled: 1835
- Incorporation: 1838

Government
  - Type: Council-Manager
  - Mayor: Roy West

Area
  - City: 85.19 sq mi (220.64 km^{2})
  - Land: 82.46 sq mi (213.56 km^{2})
  - Water: 2.73 sq mi (7.08 km^{2})
- Elevation: 16 ft (4.9 m)

Population (2020)
  - City: 115,282
  - Estimate (2022): 112,089
  - Density: 1,398.1/sq mi (539.81/km^{2})
  - Urban: 147,922 (222nd U.S.)
  - Metro: 404,872 (130th U.S.)
  - Demonym: Beaumonter
- Time zone: UTC−6 (CST)
  - Summer (DST): UTC−5 (CDT)
- ZIP codes: 77701–77710, 77713, 77720, 77725, 77726
- Area code: 409
- FIPS code: 48-07000
- GNIS feature ID: 2409806
- Website: beaumonttexas.gov

Beaumont is a city in the U.S. state of Texas. It is the county seat of Jefferson County, within the Beaumont–Port Arthur metropolitan area, located in Southeast Texas on the Neches River about 85 miles (137 km) east of Houston (city center to city center). With a population of 115,282 at the 2020 census, Its metropolitan area was the 10th largest in Texas in 2020, and 130th in the United States.

The city of Beaumont was founded in 1838. The pioneer settlement had an economy based on the development of lumber, farming, and port industries. In 1892, Joseph Eloi Broussard opened the first commercially successful rice mill in Texas, stimulating development of rice farming in the area; he also started an irrigation company (since 1933, established as the Lower Neches Valley Authority) to support rice culture. Rice became an important commodity crop in Texas and is now cultivated in 23 counties.

A big change occurred in 1901 with the Spindletop gusher, which demonstrated that a huge oil field lay underneath and adjacent to the city. With Spindletop, several energy companies developed in Beaumont, and some remain. The area rapidly developed as one of the country's major petrochemical refining areas. Along with Port Arthur and Orange, Beaumont forms the Golden Triangle, a major industrial area on the Texas Gulf Coast.

Beaumont is home to Lamar University, a national Carnegie doctoral research university with over 14,000 students, including undergraduates and postgraduates. Over the years, several corporations have been based in this city, including Gulf States Utilities, which had its headquarters in Beaumont until its takeover by Entergy Corporation in 1994. GSU's Edison Plaza headquarters remains the tallest building in Beaumont.

The ExxonMobil Beaumont Refinery and Petrochemical Complex is the largest private employer in the city and occupies more than 2,000 acres of the city and port.

== History ==
In 1824 Noah and Nancy Tevis settled on the west bank of the Neches River and developed a farm. Soon after that, a small community grew up around the farm, which was named Tevis Bluff or Neches River Settlement. In 1835 the land of Tevis, together with the nearby community of Santa Anna (in total, 50 acres (20 ha)), was purchased by Henry Millard (c. 1796–1844), Joseph Pulsifer (1805–1861), and Thomas Byers Huling (1804–1865). They began planning a town to be laid out on this land. Their partnership, J.P. Pulsifer and Company, controlled the first 50 acres (200,000 m^{2}) upon which the town was founded. This town was named Beaumont, after Mary Dewburleigh Barlace Warren Beaumont, the wife of Henry Millard. They added more property for a total of 200 acres.

Beaumont became a town on December 16, 1838. Beaumont's first mayor was Alexander Calder. From the town's founding in 1835, business activities included real estate, transportation, and retail sales. Later, other businesses were formed, especially in railroad construction and operation, new building construction, lumber sales, and communications. The Port of Beaumont became a successful regional shipping center. Beaumont was a small center for cattle raisers and farmers in its early years. With an active riverport by the 1880s, it became an important lumber and rice-milling town. The city exported rice as a commodity crop. Beaumont's lumber boom, which reached its peak in the late 19th century, was stimulated by the rebuilding and expansion of the railroads in the state and region after the Civil War.

The Beaumont Rice Mill, founded in 1892 by Joseph Eloi Broussard, was the first commercially successful rice mill in Texas. In addition, Broussard cofounded the Beaumont Irrigation Company in 1898 to operate an irrigation system to support rice culture. The company along with four others established around the same time helped stimulate the expansion of rice cultivation from 1500 acres in 1892 to 400,000 acres in 23 counties by his death in 1956. The other companies were The Port Arthur Rice and Irrigation Company, The McFaddin-Wiess-Kyle Canal Company, the Treadaway or Neches Canal Company, and the Taylors-Hillebrand complex. The holdings of those companies formed the basis for the Lower Neches Valley Authority established by the state legislature in 1933.

The rise of Beaumont's mill economy drew many new residents to the city, many of them immigrants. By the early 20th century, the city was served by the Southern Pacific; Kansas City Southern, Atchison, Topeka, and Santa Fe; and Missouri Pacific railroad systems.

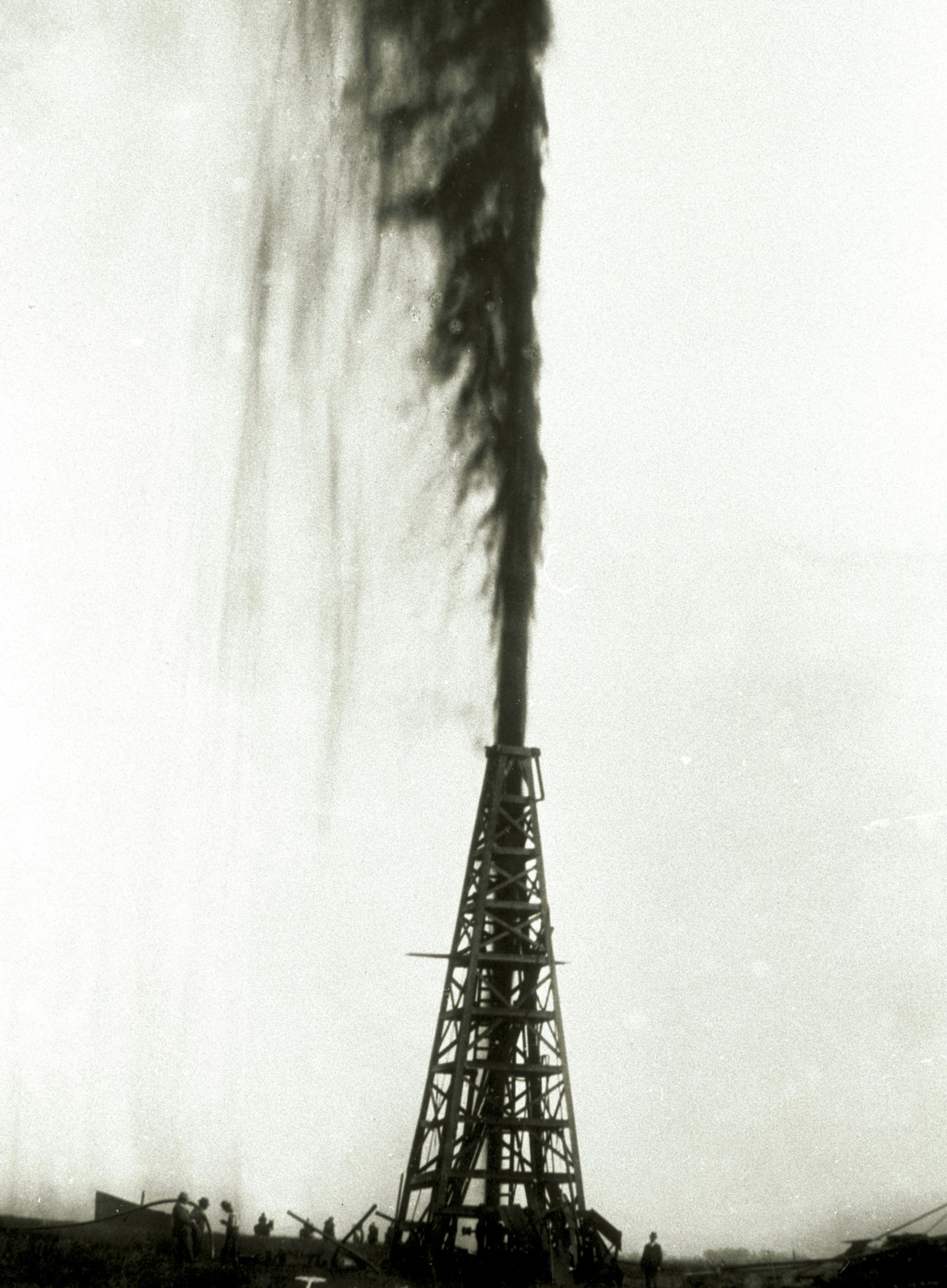
Lucas Gusher, Spindletop

Oil was discovered at nearby Spindletop on January 10, 1901. Spindletop became the first major oil field and one of the largest in American history. With the discovery of oil at Spindletop, Beaumont's population more than tripled in two months from 9,000 in January 1901 to 30,000 in March 1901.

William Casper Tyrrell, nicknamed "Captain W.C.", was a leading businessman and oil tycoon in the city in the early 20th century, developing businesses during the Texas Oil Boom. An entrepreneur from Pennsylvania and Iowa, he arrived after the gusher at Spindletop, and invested in development of a commercial port in the city, and an irrigation system to support the local rice industry, as well as residential and retail development of suburban property. He was also a philanthropist. He purchased and donated First Baptist Church, whose congregation had moved to a new facility, to use as the city's first public library, now known as the Tyrrell Historical Library.

When the city became a major center for defense shipbuilding during World War II, tens of thousands of rural Texans migrated there for the new high-paying jobs. The Roosevelt administration ordered the defense industry to be integrated, and many Southern white males were working closely with black males for the first time. Housing was scarce in the crowded city, and racial tensions increased. In June 1943 after workers at the Pennsylvania shipyards in Beaumont learned that a white woman had accused a black man of raping her, nearly 2,000 went to the jail where a suspect was being held, attracting more men along the way and reaching a total of 4,000. Ultimately the white mob rioted for three days, destroying major black neighborhoods and killing five persons. No one was prosecuted for the deaths. The riot in Beaumont was one of several in 1943 which centered in the defense industry, including Los Angeles, Detroit, and Mobile, Alabama as well as other cities across the country. The wartime social disruption was similar to war time riots which had occurred in other parts of the country during and following World War I.

During the war years, airmen cadets from the Royal Air Force, flying from their training base at Terrell, Texas, routinely flew to Beaumont on training flights. The community served as a stand-in for the British for Paris, France, which was the same distance from London, England as Beaumont is from Terrell.

In the postwar years, Beaumont's port continued in importance. As was typical with other cities, post-war highway construction led to the development of new suburbs and dispersal of the population in search of new housing. Recently, there has been some renewal in Downtown Beaumont and in other areas of the city.

In 1996, the Jefferson County courts, located in Beaumont, became the first court in the nation to implement electronic filing and service of court documents. This eliminated the need for law firms to print and mail reams of documents.

In 2005 and 2008, Beaumont and surrounding areas suffered extensive damage from Hurricane Rita and Hurricane Ike, respectively. Mandatory evacuations were issued in advance of both storms.

In August 2017, Beaumont and surrounding areas experienced severe flooding as a result of Hurricane Harvey. Due to the flooding, Baptist Hospital of Southeast Texas evacuated all of its highest level of acuity patients with the help of National Guard helicopters. In addition, many Beaumont residents had to be rescued by both boats and helicopters as a result of the floodwaters. As of March 2019, many residents in the area are still attempting to recover from the hurricane as the city received emergency assistance.

== Geography ==
According to the United States Census Bureau, the city has a total area of 85.8 square miles (222.3 km^{2}), of which 82.8 square miles (214.5 km^{2}) are land and 3.1 square miles (7.9 km^{2}), or 3.53%, are water.

Beaumont lies on Texas' coastal plain, about 30 miles (48 km) inland from the Gulf of Mexico, 85 miles (137 km) east of Houston, and just south of the dense pine forests of East Texas. The city is bordered on the east by the Neches River and to the north by Pine Island Bayou. Before being settled, the area was crisscrossed by numerous small streams. Most of these streams have since been filled in or converted for drainage purposes. The island directly across from Riverfront Park is called Trinity Island. There are also three other islands in the Neches River around the downtown area/port: Harbor, Smith and Clark. Beaumont is relatively flat compared to other Texas cites at being 16 ft. above sea level. South of Beaumont, Port Arthur is only 7 ft. above sea level.

=== Annexations ===
Several towns and communities have been absorbed into the city of Beaumont. These include: Amelia, established in 1885 and incorporated into Beaumont in 1956; Elizabeth, the depot of Amelia that was established around 1903 or after and annexed into Beaumont in 1957; Elwood, established sometimes in the late 1800s, changed to Voth in 1902, and annexed into Beaumont in 1957; Guffey, post office was established in 1901 and closed in 1925 but is part of Beaumont now; Santa Anna, became part of Beaumont when it was founded; Tevis Bluff, became part of Beaumont when it was founded in 1835.

=== Architecture ===
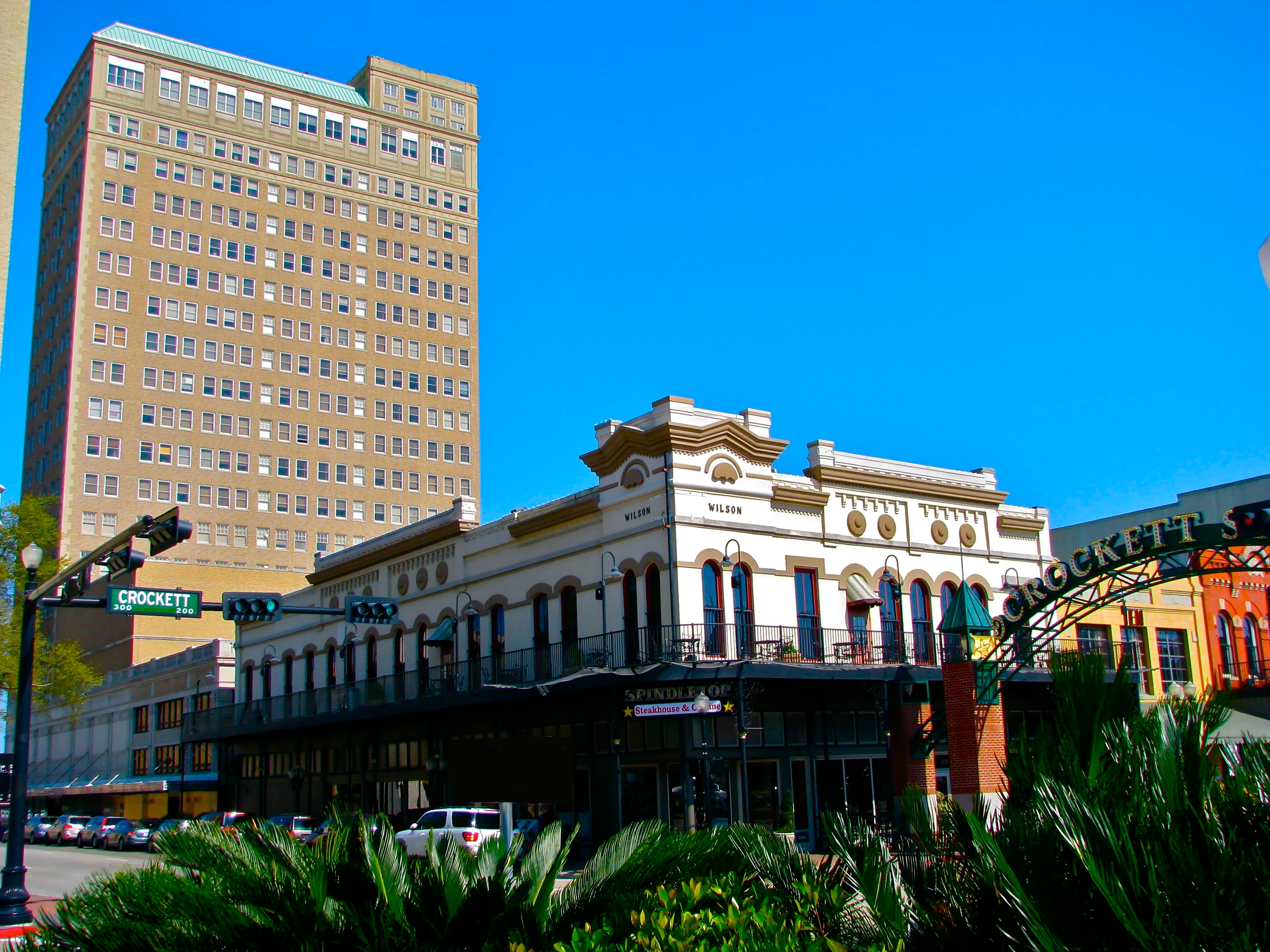
Beaumont Commercial District

Beaumont has 8 buildings over 100 feet (30 m) tall, the tallest being the Edison Plaza, which is 254 feet (77 m) tall. The old Edson Hotel, built in 1928 is nearly the same height at 240 feet (73 m). One of the most prominent downtown buildings is the 15-story San Jacinto Building. Built in 1921, it sports one of the largest four faced clock towers in the nation, each dial being 17 feet (5.2 m) in diameter. In 1922 the 11-story Hotel Beaumont was built across the street from the San Jacinto. The Hotel Beaumont bears a resemblance to the old Winecoff Hotel in Atlanta.

The second oil boom of 1925 brought more people and wealth to Beaumont, the same year the 12-story American National Bank Building (now Orleans Building), was erected, and in 1926 Forrest Goodhue built the 12-story Goodhue Building which included a penthouse. In 1928, the Edson Hotel was built. No other buildings were built until Century Tower in 1962 and in 1982 Edison Plaza was built. In 1994 the 12-story LaSalle Hotel, built in 1927, was demolished.

The Jefferson Theatre was built in 1927 by the Jefferson Amusement Company for $1 million and was Beaumont's showpiece for many years. In 1928 the City Hall and Auditorium was built. It is now the Julie Rogers Theater.

Beaumont's Jefferson County Courthouse is one of the tallest county courthouses in the state and is an excellent example of Art Deco architecture. Across the street from the Jack Brooks Federal Building is the Kyle Building, built in 1933. The storefront was recently restored and is considered to be one of the best examples of Zig-Zag architecture in Texas. The Oaks Historic District has many restored historic homes.

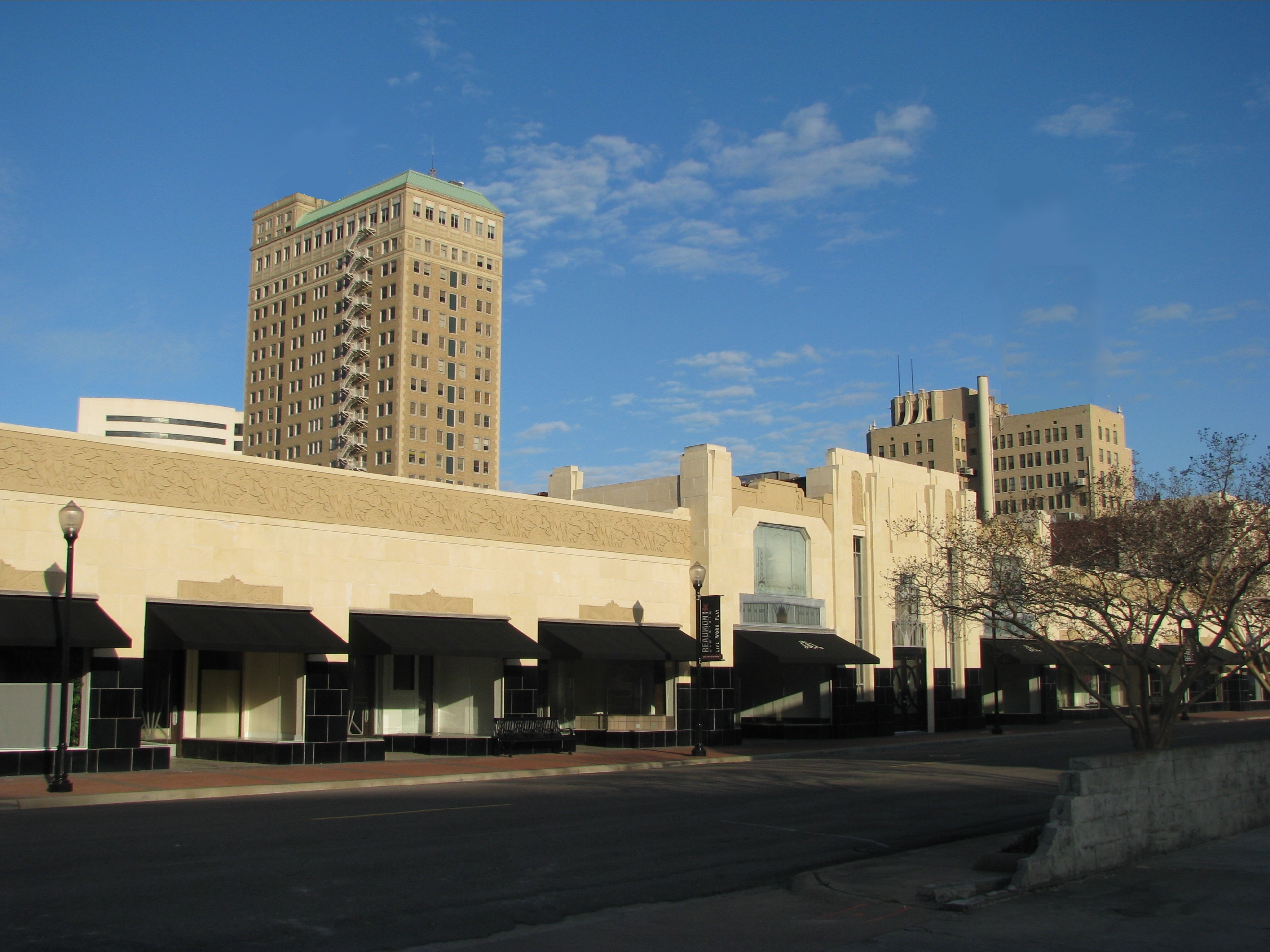
Kyle Building, Edson Hotel, Goodhue Building

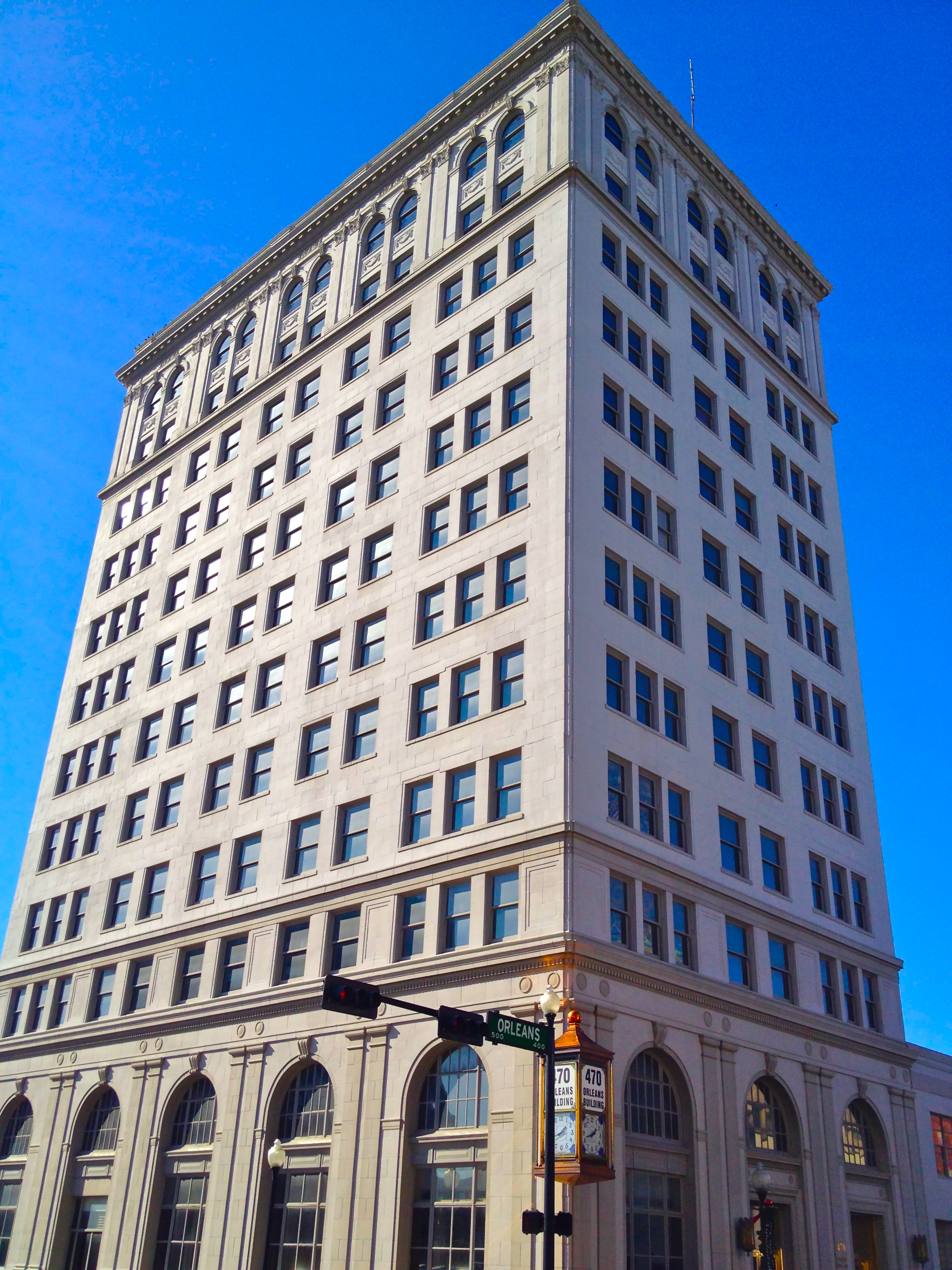
Orleans Building

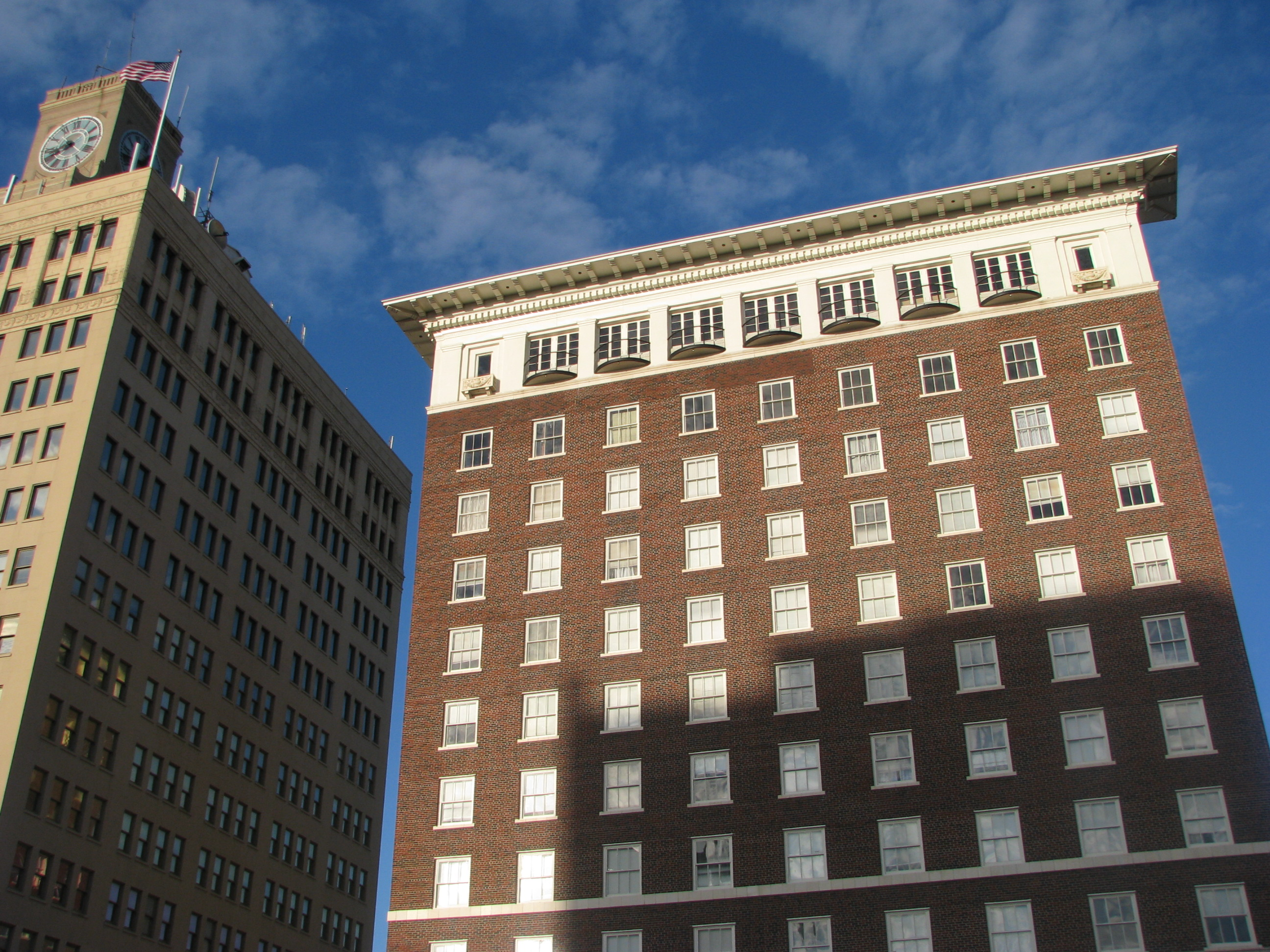
Left-San Jacinto Building, Right-Hotel Beaumont

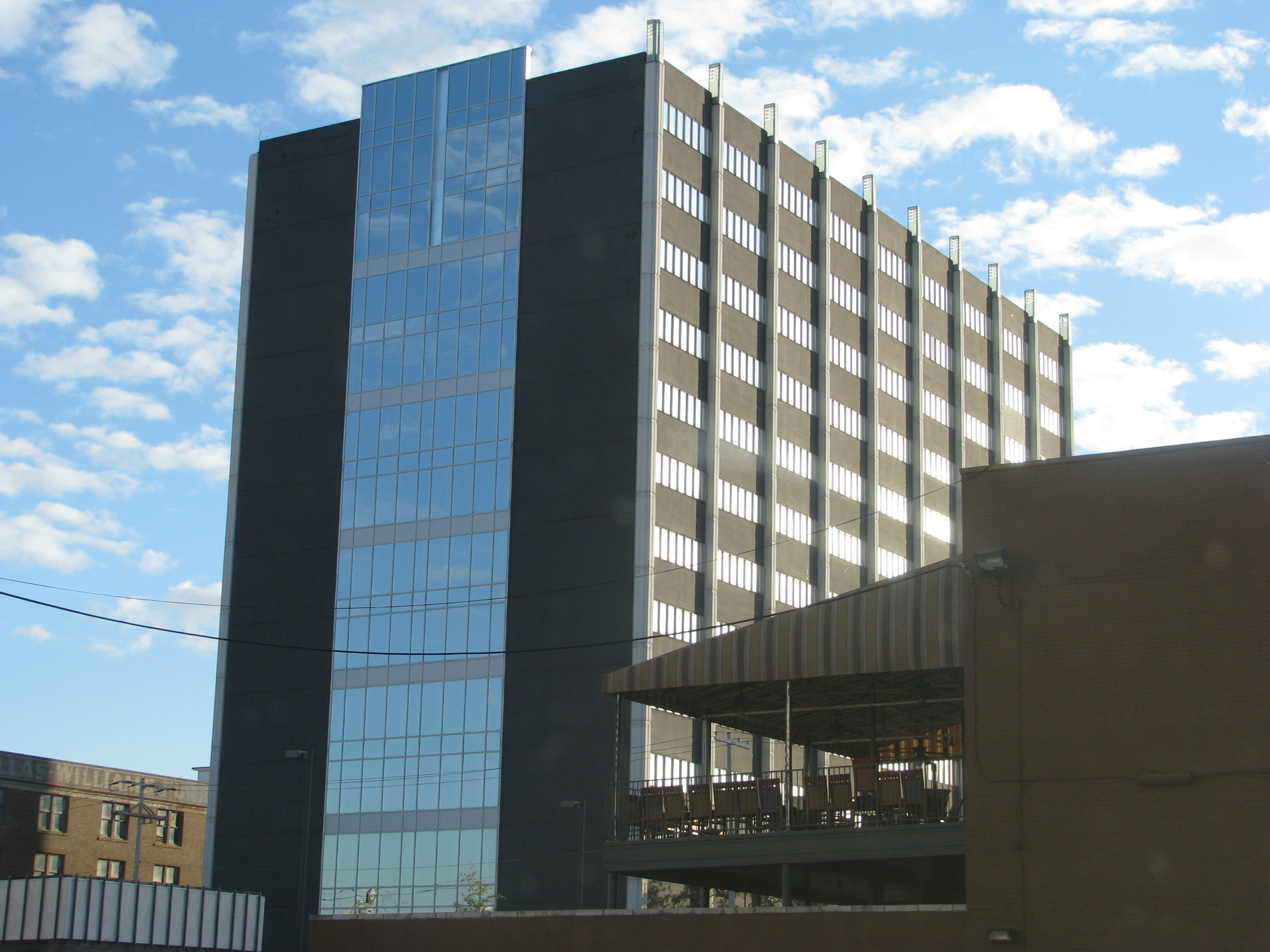
Century Tower

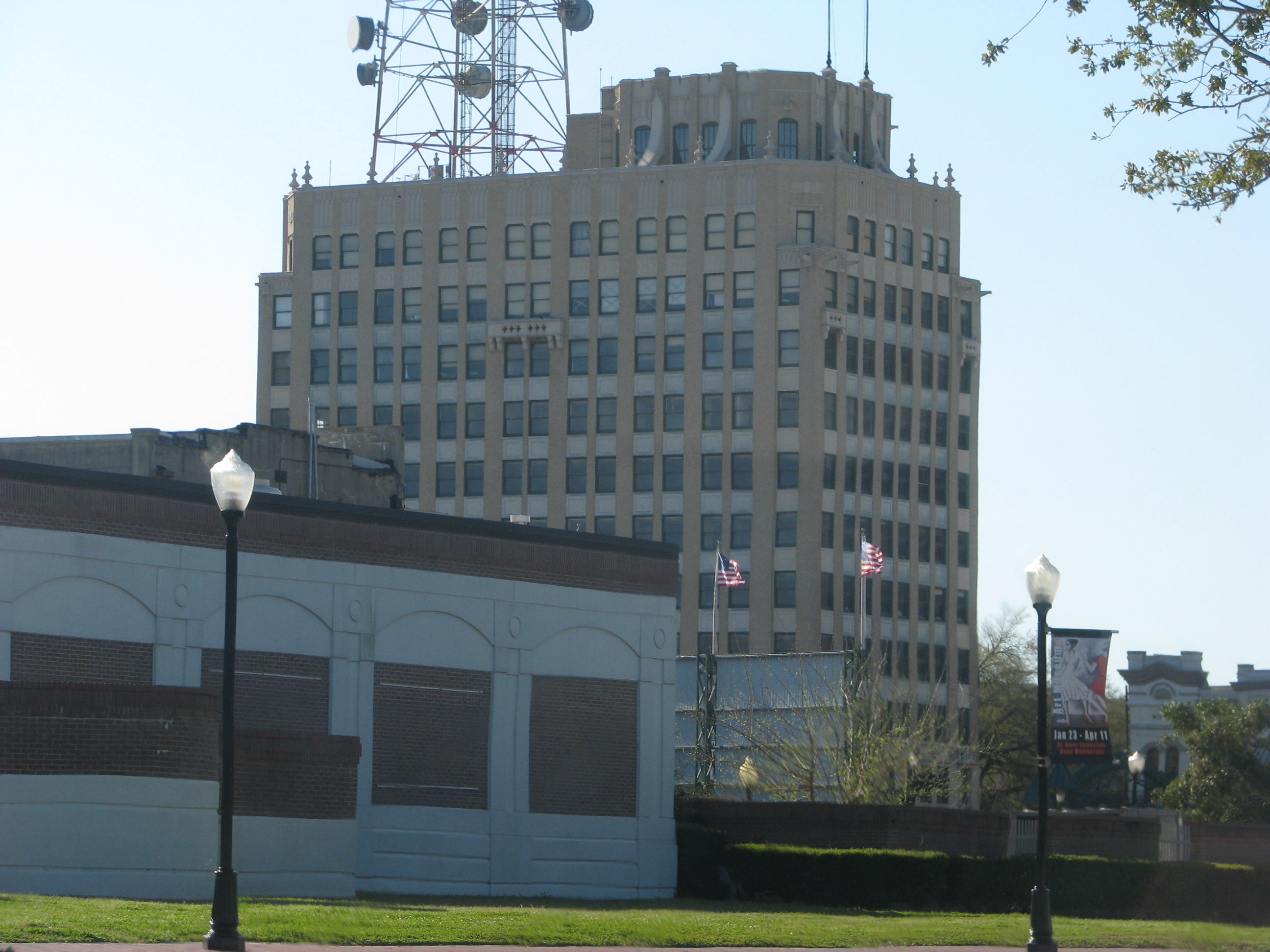
Goodhue Building

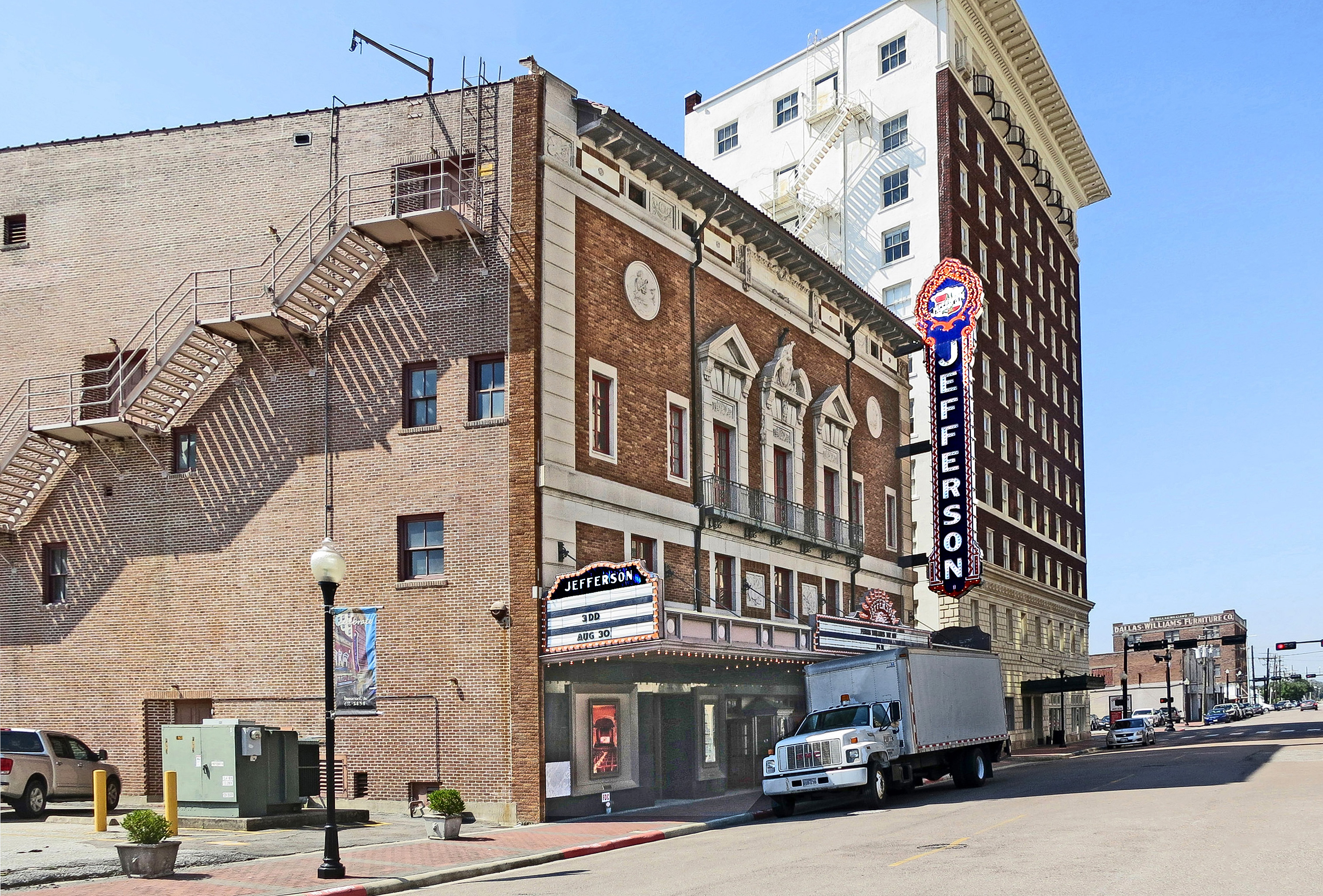
Jefferson Theatre.

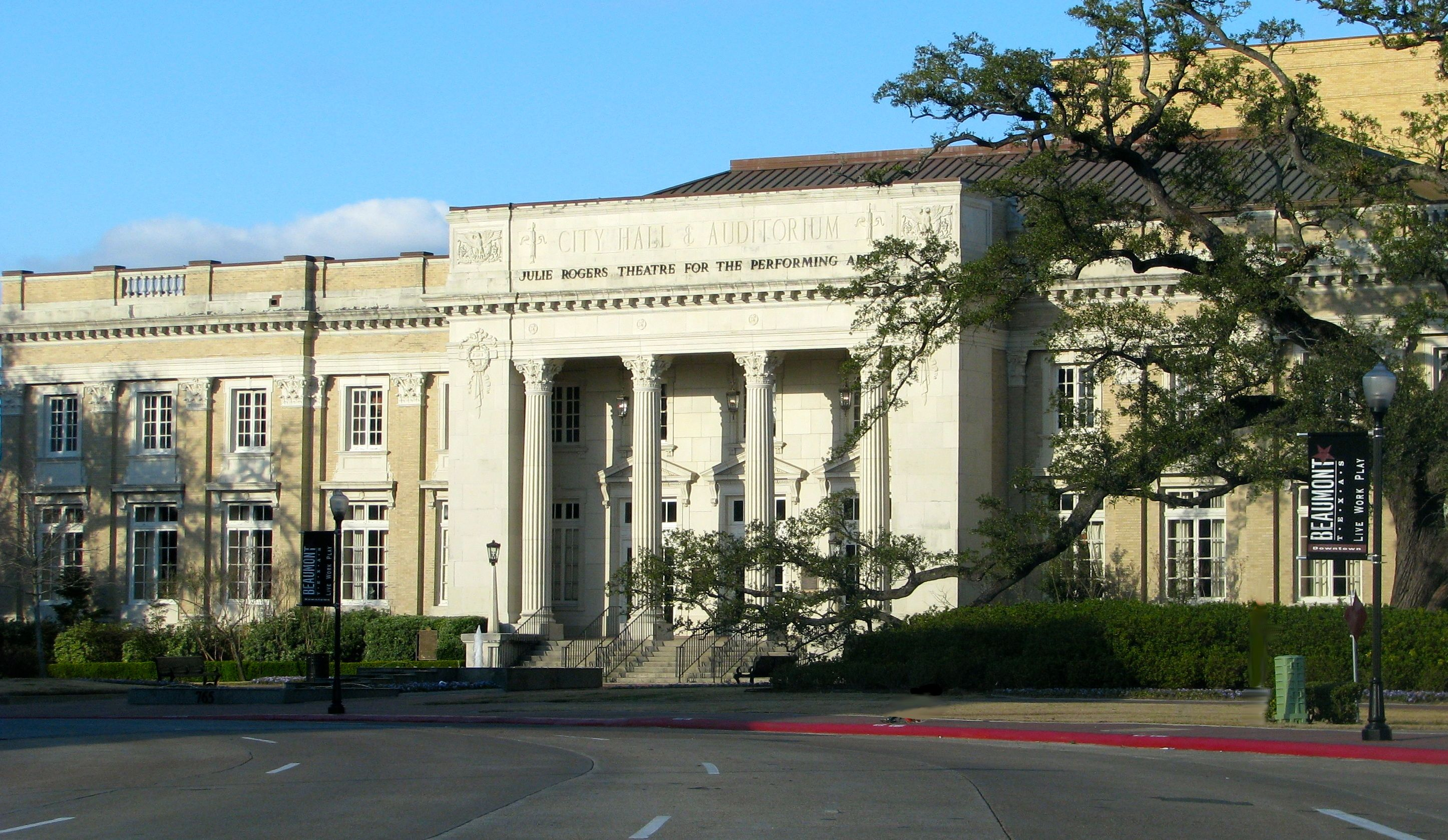
Julie Rogers Theater

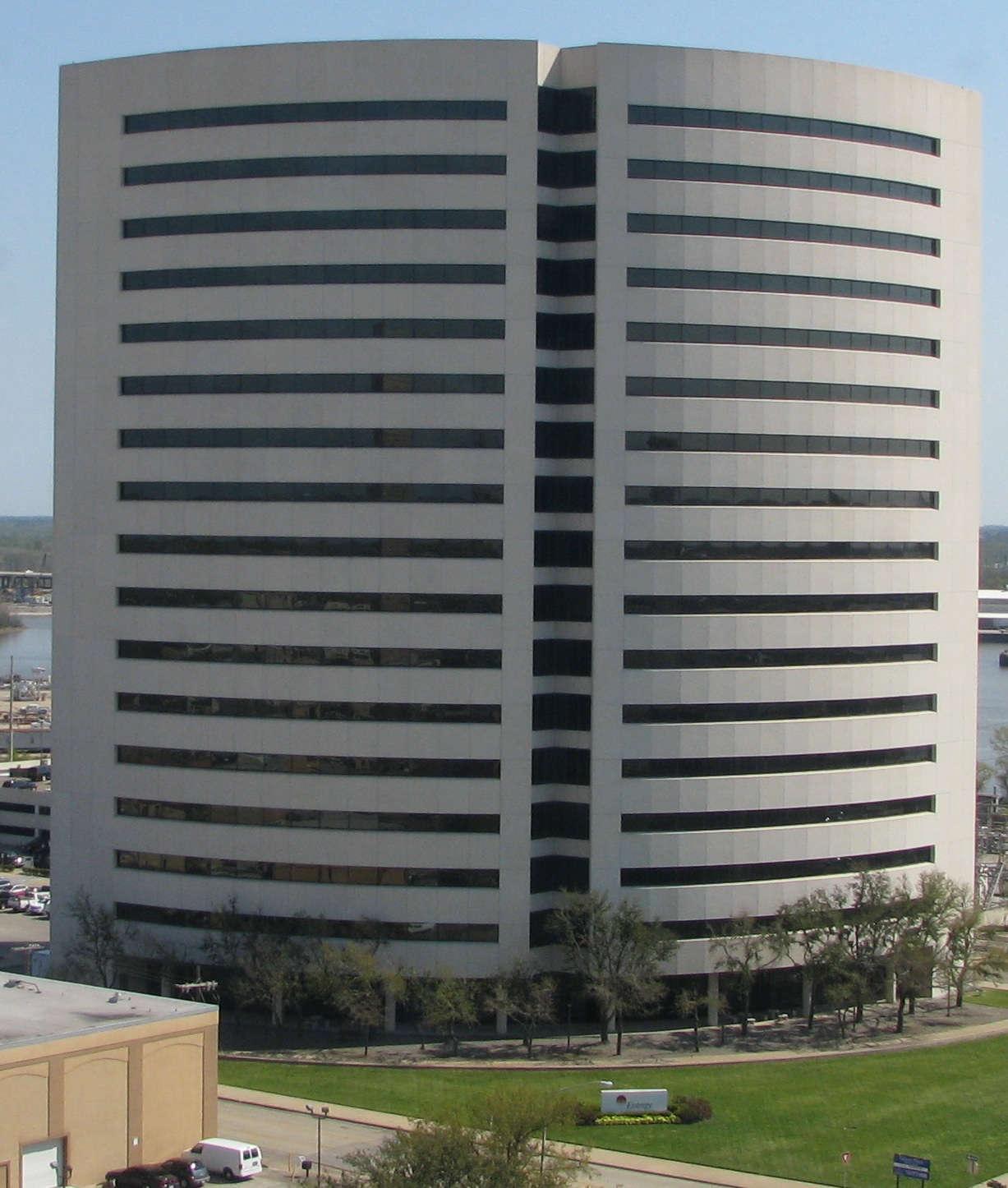
Edison Plaza

=== Pollution ===
The Beaumont–Port Arthur region has historically been cited as one of the most polluted urban areas in the United States due to various energy industries and chemical plants in the area. Even so, as of July 2014, the Beaumont-Port Arthur region was not under any Environmental Protection Agency non-attainment restrictions; however, counties in the Greater Houston area, the Dallas–Fort Worth metroplex, and El Paso were. As of October 2014, the Beaumont-Port Arthur area was not under any Texas Commission on Environmental Quality attainment compliance deadlines. Regardless, according to an article published in 2007 focusing on Port Arthur, a neighboring city to the southeast of Beaumont, pollution was believed to have caused some area residents to become sick. This has generated debates throughout the local media.

=== Climate ===
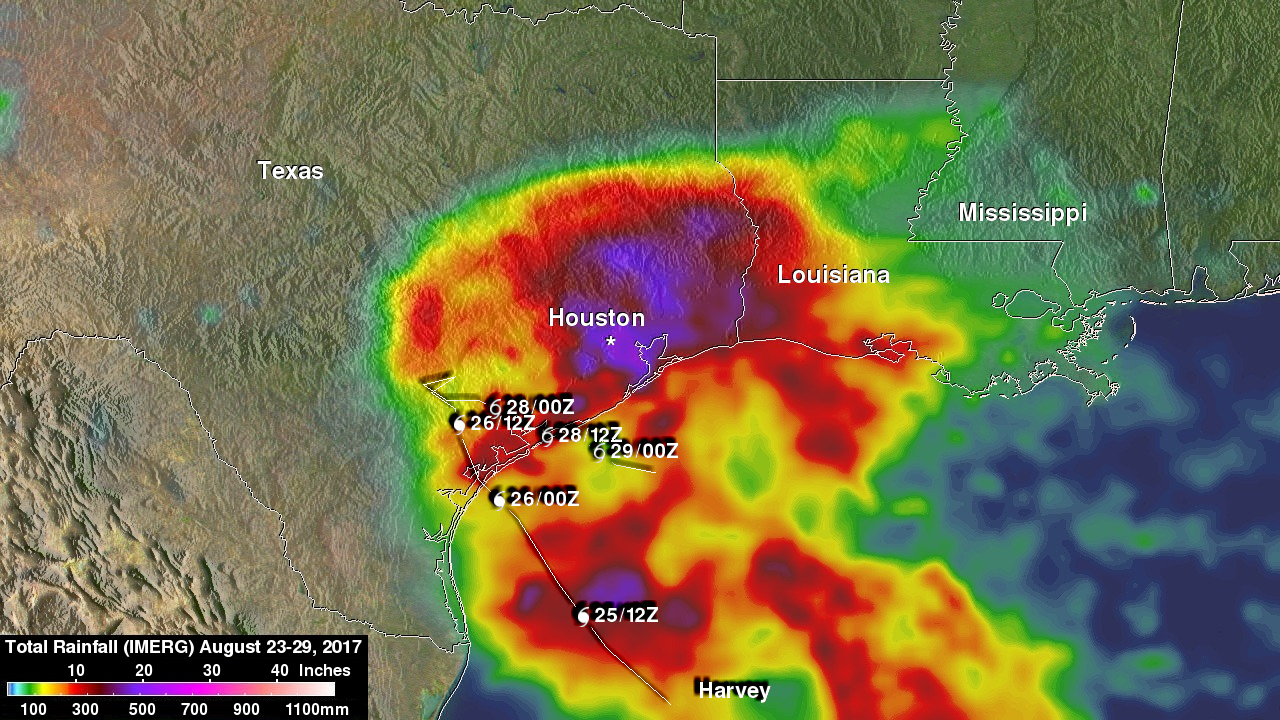
Rainfall map of Hurricane Harvey over Beaumont and Houston

The city of Beaumont experiences a humid subtropical climate and is within the Piney Woods region of eastern Texas. The area around Beaumont receives the most rainfall in the state, and some of the most rain in the country: more than 65 inches (1,700 mm) annually. The city has two distinct seasons, a wet season from April to October and a dry season from November to March. Hurricanes also pose a threat to the city and greater metropolitan area.

Hurricane Rita in 2005 and Hurricane Ike in 2008 both caused significant damage. Both Hurricane Harvey in 2017 and Tropical Storm Imelda in 2019 caused historic flooding throughout the city. Hurricane Laura in 2020 posed a significant threat to the town, as it was forecasted to make landfall at the border of Texas and Louisiana, almost following the same track as Hurricane Rita in 2005. The storm turned more northerly close to landfall, and spared Beaumont the worst impacts and damage. Minor damage was reported with winds gusting around hurricane-force for a short period of time as Laura moved over Lake Charles, Louisiana. Also, Hurricane Delta in 2020 passed near the region as it made landfall in Southwest Louisiana. Impacts were about the same with Delta as they were with Laura.

On August 18, 2009, a tornado hit the west side of Beaumont, causing damage to cars and several local businesses. Injuries were minimal.

While wintry precipitation is unusual, it does occur. The most recent significant wintry event to occur was December 8, 2017 when the Southeast Texas Regional Airport recorded 3 inches (76 mm) of snowfall. December 11, 2008 and December 4, 2009, were also days that Beaumont saw measurable snowfall. Snow also fell across the Beaumont area on Christmas Eve 2004. In January 1997, a severe and historic ice storm struck the region, leaving thousands without power and major tree damage in its wake. In unofficial records, Beaumont received as much as 30 inches (760 mm) of snow during the blizzard of February 1895 that impacted the Gulf Coast.

Climate data for Beaumont, Texas (1991–2020 normals, extremes 1901–present)
| Month | Jan | Feb | Mar | Apr | May | Jun | Jul | Aug | Sep | Oct | Nov | Dec | Year |
|---|---|---|---|---|---|---|---|---|---|---|---|---|---|
| Record high °F (°C) | 86 (30) | 90 (32) | 95 (35) | 97 (36) | 101 (38) | 106 (41) | 108 (42) | 105 (41) | 108 (42) | 99 (37) | 94 (34) | 86 (30) | 108 (42) |
| Mean maximum °F (°C) | 77.6 (25.3) | 79.1 (26.2) | 83.4 (28.6) | 87.3 (30.7) | 92.2 (33.4) | 96.2 (35.7) | 97.7 (36.5) | 98.7 (37.1) | 96.0 (35.6) | 91.2 (32.9) | 84.6 (29.2) | 78.7 (25.9) | 99.5 (37.5) |
| Mean daily maximum °F (°C) | 62.6 (17.0) | 65.8 (18.8) | 72.1 (22.3) | 78.3 (25.7) | 85.2 (29.6) | 90.4 (32.4) | 92.0 (33.3) | 92.8 (33.8) | 88.6 (31.4) | 81.5 (27.5) | 71.4 (21.9) | 64.2 (17.9) | 78.7 (25.9) |
| Daily mean °F (°C) | 52.9 (11.6) | 56.6 (13.7) | 62.9 (17.2) | 68.9 (20.5) | 76.6 (24.8) | 82.3 (27.9) | 83.7 (28.7) | 84.1 (28.9) | 79.3 (26.3) | 71.0 (21.7) | 61.3 (16.3) | 54.7 (12.6) | 69.5 (20.8) |
| Mean daily minimum °F (°C) | 43.3 (6.3) | 47.4 (8.6) | 53.7 (12.1) | 59.4 (15.2) | 68.1 (20.1) | 74.1 (23.4) | 75.5 (24.2) | 75.3 (24.1) | 70.1 (21.2) | 60.6 (15.9) | 51.2 (10.7) | 45.1 (7.3) | 60.3 (15.7) |
| Mean minimum °F (°C) | 28.4 (−2.0) | 33.6 (0.9) | 37.5 (3.1) | 44.3 (6.8) | 54.7 (12.6) | 66.5 (19.2) | 69.5 (20.8) | 69.0 (20.6) | 59.5 (15.3) | 45.0 (7.2) | 34.7 (1.5) | 30.9 (−0.6) | 26.6 (−3.0) |
| Record low °F (°C) | 11 (−12) | 10 (−12) | 20 (−7) | 36 (2) | 43 (6) | 53 (12) | 64 (18) | 57 (14) | 44 (7) | 33 (1) | 23 (−5) | 20 (−7) | 10 (−12) |
| Average precipitation inches (mm) | 5.38 (137) | 3.66 (93) | 3.73 (95) | 3.93 (100) | 5.24 (133) | 7.04 (179) | 6.48 (165) | 7.19 (183) | 7.36 (187) | 5.38 (137) | 4.42 (112) | 5.26 (134) | 65.07 (1,653) |
| Average snowfall inches (cm) | 0.0 (0.0) | 0.0 (0.0) | 0.0 (0.0) | 0.0 (0.0) | 0.0 (0.0) | 0.0 (0.0) | 0.0 (0.0) | 0.0 (0.0) | 0.0 (0.0) | 0.0 (0.0) | 0.0 (0.0) | 0.1 (0.25) | 0.1 (0.25) |
| Average precipitation days (≥ 0.01 in) | 10.3 | 9.5 | 8.2 | 7.2 | 7.2 | 10.6 | 12.0 | 10.4 | 9.2 | 7.2 | 7.9 | 10.0 | 109.7 |
| Average snowy days (≥ 0.1 in) | 0.0 | 0.0 | 0.0 | 0.0 | 0.0 | 0.0 | 0.0 | 0.0 | 0.0 | 0.0 | 0.0 | 0.0 | 0.0 |
Source: NOAA

== Demographics ==
Historical population
| Census | Pop. | Note | %± |
|---|---|---|---|
| 1850 | 171 | | — |
| 1890 | 3,296 | | — |
| 1900 | 9,427 | | 186.0% |
| 1910 | 20,640 | | 118.9% |
| 1920 | 40,422 | | 95.8% |
| 1930 | 57,732 | | 42.8% |
| 1940 | 59,061 | | 2.3% |
| 1950 | 94,014 | | 59.2% |
| 1960 | 119,175 | | 26.8% |
| 1970 | 117,548 | | −1.4% |
| 1980 | 118,067 | | 0.4% |
| 1990 | 114,177 | | −3.3% |
| 2000 | 113,866 | | −0.3% |
| 2010 | 118,296 | | 3.9% |
| 2020 | 115,282 | | −2.5% |
U.S. Decennial Census; 1850–1900 1910; 1920 1930 1940; 1950 1960 1970; 1980 1990 2000; 2010 2020

Demographic details for Beaumont are recorded through the decennial censuses and supporting surveys; the sections below detail the city's racial composition and the most recent census snapshots.

=== Racial and ethnic composition ===
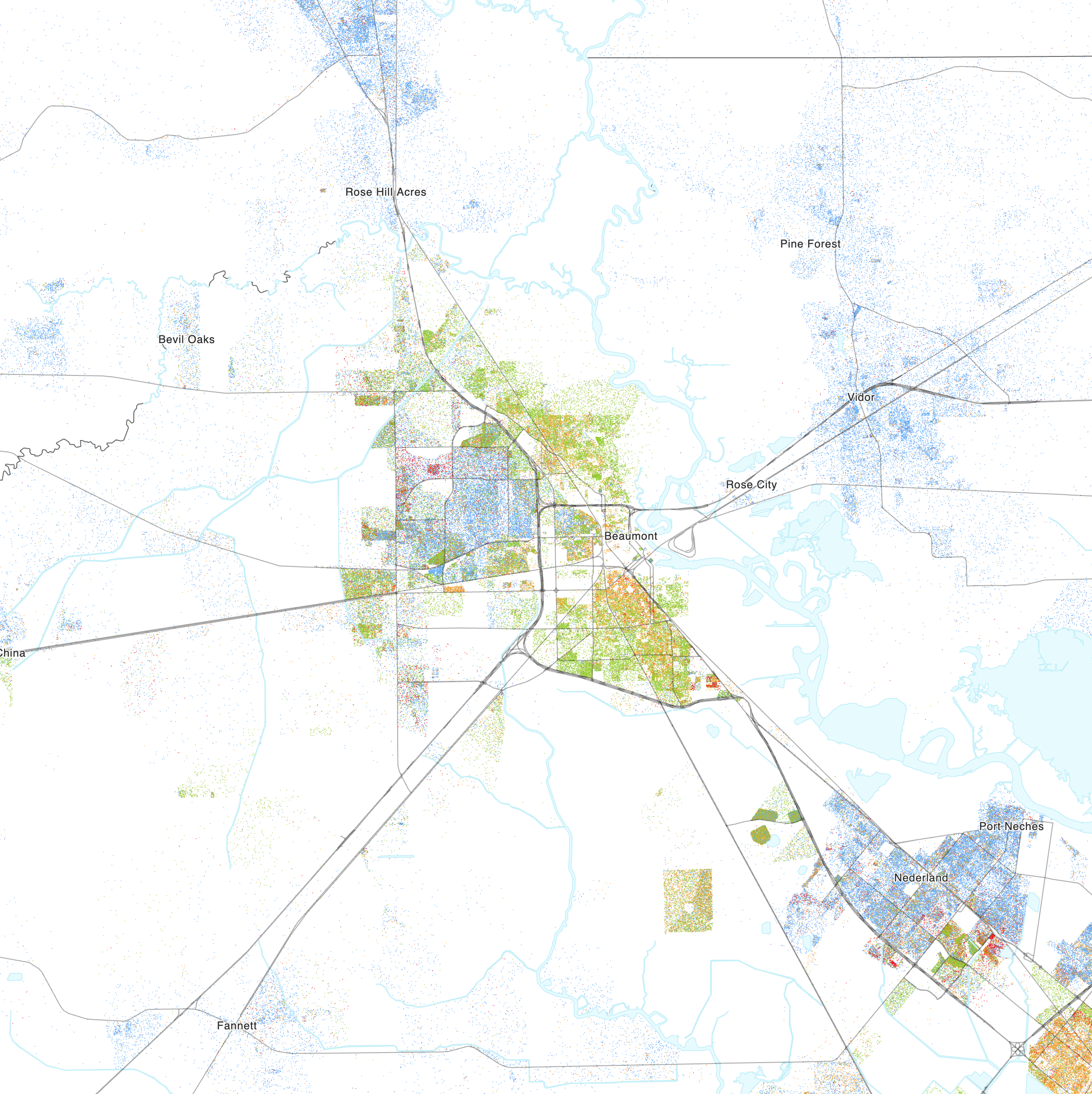
Map of racial distribution in Beaumont, 2020 U.S. census. Each dot is one person: ⬤ White ⬤ Black ⬤ Asian ⬤ Hispanic ⬤ Multiracial ⬤ Native American/Other

Beaumont city, Texas – Racial and ethnic composition Note: the US Census treats Hispanic/Latino as an ethnic category. This table excludes Latinos from the racial categories and assigns them to a separate category. Hispanics/Latinos may be of any race.
| Race / Ethnicity (NH = Non-Hispanic) | Pop 2000 | Pop 2010 | Pop 2020 | % 2000 | % 2010 | % 2020 |
|---|---|---|---|---|---|---|
| White alone (NH) | 48,595 | 41,041 | 32,549 | 42.68% | 34.69% | 28.23% |
| Black or African American alone (NH) | 51,928 | 55,489 | 54,034 | 45.60% | 46.91% | 46.87% |
| Native American or Alaska Native alone (NH) | 223 | 360 | 209 | 0.20% | 0.30% | 0.18% |
| Asian alone (NH) | 2,808 | 3,850 | 4,328 | 2.47% | 3.25% | 3.75% |
| Native Hawaiian or Pacific Islander alone (NH) | 36 | 25 | 29 | 0.03% | 0.02% | 0.03% |
| Other race alone (NH) | 118 | 11 | 486 | 0.10% | 0.09% | 0.42% |
| Mixed race or Multiracial (NH) | 1,130 | 1,522 | 3,040 | 0.99% | 1.29% | 2.64% |
| Hispanic or Latino (any race) | 9,028 | 15,898 | 20,607 | 7.93% | 13.44% | 17.88% |
| Total | 113,866 | 118,296 | 115,282 | 100.00% | 100.00% | 100.00% |

=== 2020 census ===
As of the 2020 census, Beaumont had a population of 115,282. The median age was 36.8 years, 24.4% of residents were under the age of 18, and 15.9% were 65 years of age or older. For every 100 females there were 92.5 males, and for every 100 females age 18 and over there were 89.8 males age 18 and over.

98.8% of residents lived in urban areas, while 1.2% lived in rural areas.

There were 45,922 households in Beaumont, of which 31.4% had children under the age of 18 living in them. Of all households, 36.7% were married-couple households, 21.4% were households with a male householder and no spouse or partner present, and 36.1% were households with a female householder and no spouse or partner present. About 31.6% of all households were made up of individuals and 11.8% had someone living alone who was 65 years of age or older.

There were 51,953 housing units, of which 11.6% were vacant. Among occupied housing units, 54.0% were owner-occupied and 46.0% were renter-occupied. The homeowner vacancy rate was 1.9% and the rental vacancy rate was 11.1%.

Racial composition as of the 2020 census
| Race | Percent |
|---|---|
| White | 31.1% |
| Black or African American | 47.3% |
| American Indian and Alaska Native | 0.6% |
| Asian | 3.8% |
| Native Hawaiian and Other Pacific Islander | <0.1% |
| Some other race | 9.6% |
| Two or more races | 7.5% |

By 2020 the city's non-Hispanic white share had declined to 31.1%, while 47.3% of residents identified as Black or African American and the Hispanic or Latino population of any race counted 20,607 residents (17.9%). These shifts mirrored nationwide trends of diversification and self-identification.

=== 2010 census ===
According to the 2010 United States census there were 118,296 people, 45,648 households, and 28,859 families residing in the city limits. In 2010, Beaumont's population density was 1,339.4 inhabitants per square mile (517.1/km^{2}). Housing units were at an average density of 574.2 per square mile (221.7/km^{2}).

Of the 45,648 households at the 2010 United States census, out of which 28.9% had children under the age of 18 living with them, 38.7% were married couples living together, 19.2% had a female householder with no husband present, and 36.8% were non-families; 30.7% of all households were made up of individuals, and 10.0% had someone living alone who was 65 years of age or older. The average household size was 2.48 and the average family size was 3.12. Among its population at the 2019 American Community Survey, the median age was 34.6 and the average family size was 3.23. From an estimated 45,435 occupied housing units in 2019, 52.1% were owner-occupied and the median selected monthly costs for units with a mortgage were $1,366 and $412 without a mortgage.

The median income for a household in the city was $39,699, according to the American Community Survey during 2010, and the median income for a family was $49,766. The per capita income for the city was $23,137. About 17.6% of families and 22.1% of the population lived at or below the poverty line. From 2014 to 2019, its median income for households was $54,488; families had a median income of $61,069; married-couple families $78,239; and non-family households $29,415. In 2019, an estimated 16.7% of the population lived at or below the poverty line.

=== Religion ===
Saint Anthony Cathedral Basilica of the Roman Catholic Diocese of Beaumont

Religiously, Sperling's BestPlaces estimated roughly 78.6% of the population were religious. Christianity, since colonial times, has remained the dominant religion by identification in Beaumont and its surrounding area. Among the Christian community, Baptists were the largest Protestant Christian tradition and spread among numerous denominations; the most notable denominational affiliations among Baptists were the Southern Baptist Convention and National Baptist Convention (USA and America). Roman Catholicism, however, remained the largest single denomination in the city as a result of Spanish colonialism and missionary work, and its increasing Hispanic or Latino population (reflecting nationwide trends); Roman Catholics have been primarily served by the Roman Catholic Diocese of Beaumont which is a jurisdiction of the Roman Catholic Ecclesiastical Province of Galveston–Houston. The Church of Jesus Christ of Latter-day Saints has one stake that covers the city and surrounding area.

Beyond Christianity, the second largest religion in the city and metropolitan area has been Islam, with religious Jews comprising the third largest religiously-affiliated demographic in Beaumont; Jewish Beaumonters settled the area in the 19th century, primarily affiliated with Orthodox Judaism. As the area has a substantial Islamic community, interfaith efforts among the dominant religions have occurred, and the Islamic Society of the Triplex completed a 9,000 square foot mosque in 2017.

== Economy ==
According to the city's 2018 Comprehensive Annual Financial Report the top employers in the city were:

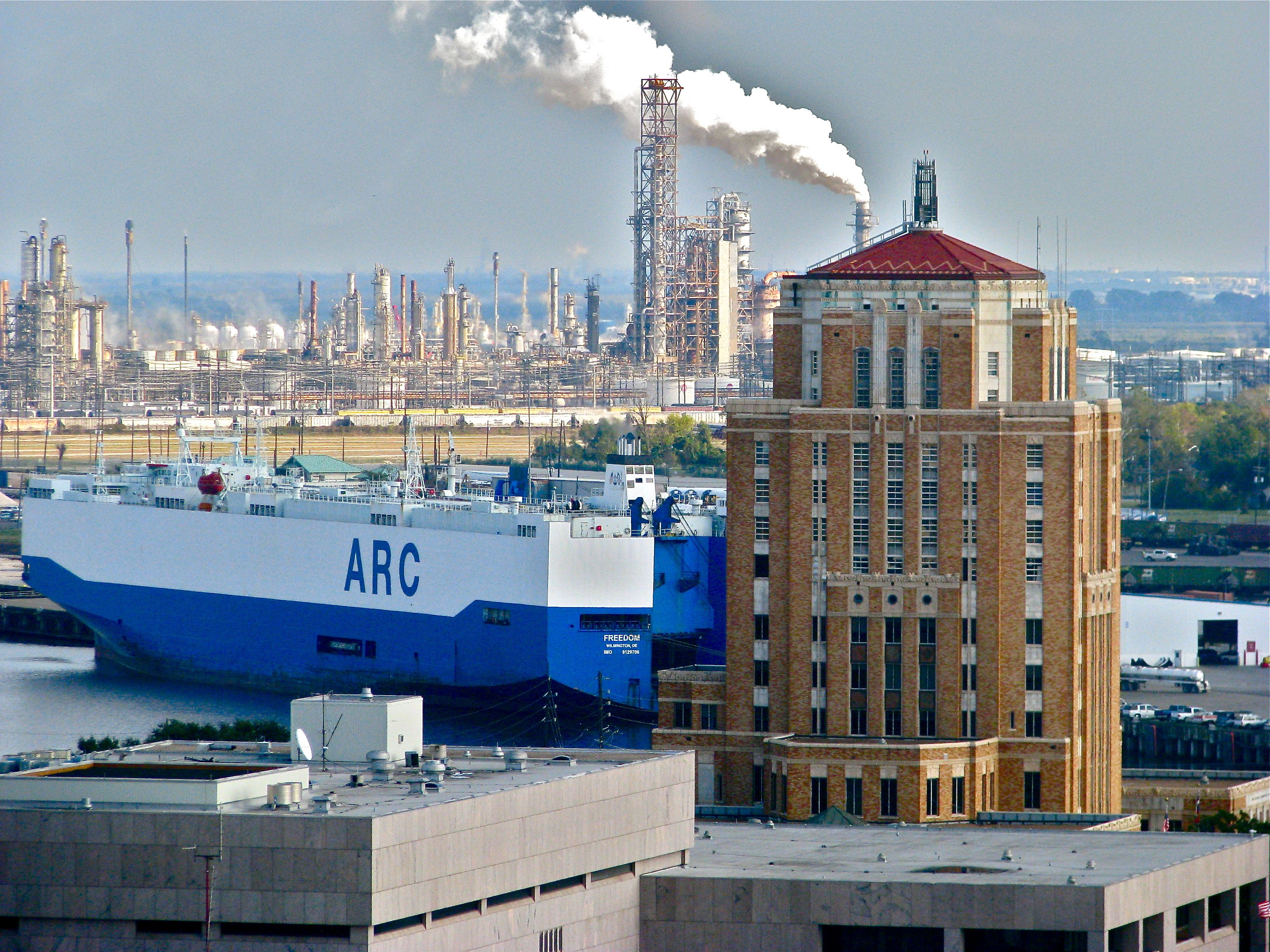
Refineries, Port of Beaumont and the Jefferson County Courthouse

| # | Employer | # of Employees |
|---|---|---|
| 1 | Lamar University | 2,546 |
| 2 | Beaumont Independent School District | 2,317 |
| 3 | ExxonMobil Corporation Beaumont Refinery | 2,189 |
| 4 | Christus St. Elizabeth Hospital | 2,136 |
| 5 | Baptist Hospital of Southeast Texas | 1,653 |
| 6 | City of Beaumont | 1,293 |
| 7 | Jefferson County | 1,155 |
| 8 | Burrow Global Services | 785 |
| 9 | Conns Appliances Inc. | 617 |
| 10 | Alorica | 372 |

A significant element of the region's economy is the Port of Beaumont, one of the largest seaports by tonnage in the United States. The 842nd Transportation Battalion and the 596th Transportation Group are both stationed at the port in Beaumont.

In addition to companies doing business within the city limits, several large industrial facilities are located within the city's five-mile extraterritorial jurisdiction boundaries including the ExxonMobil Beaumont refinery and chemical plants, Goodyear Beaumont chemical plant, and DuPont chemical plant.

Jason's Deli has its headquarters in Beaumont. Conn's Appliances did have its headquarters in Beaumont; however, in mid-2012, Conn's moved its corporate headquarters to The Woodlands. Originally Sweet Leaf Tea Company had its headquarters in Beaumont. The headquarters moved to Austin in October 2003. Other prominent businesses which have been associated with the city and area have included the following: Bethlehem Steel/Trinity Industries Shipyard, where over eight hundred (800) vessels were built and repaired at the shipyard including barges, ships, and offshore drilling rigs including seventy-two (72) jack up offshore drilling rigs, the second-most offshore drilling rigs built in the United States, and seventy-one (71) Type C1 ships built for the U.S. Maritime Commission during World War II; Dresser Industries, a Dresser-Ideco plant was a major employer for seventy-seven years; the plant, with around 350 employees, closed in 1985; Gulf Oil; Humble Oil; Magnolia Petroleum Company; The Texas Oil Company; The Texas Coffee Company, the first company in the United States to begin packaging coffee in vacuum-packed foil bags; and Universal Coin & Bullion, one of the largest retailers in precious metals and rare coins.

== Culture ==
=== Arts and theatre ===
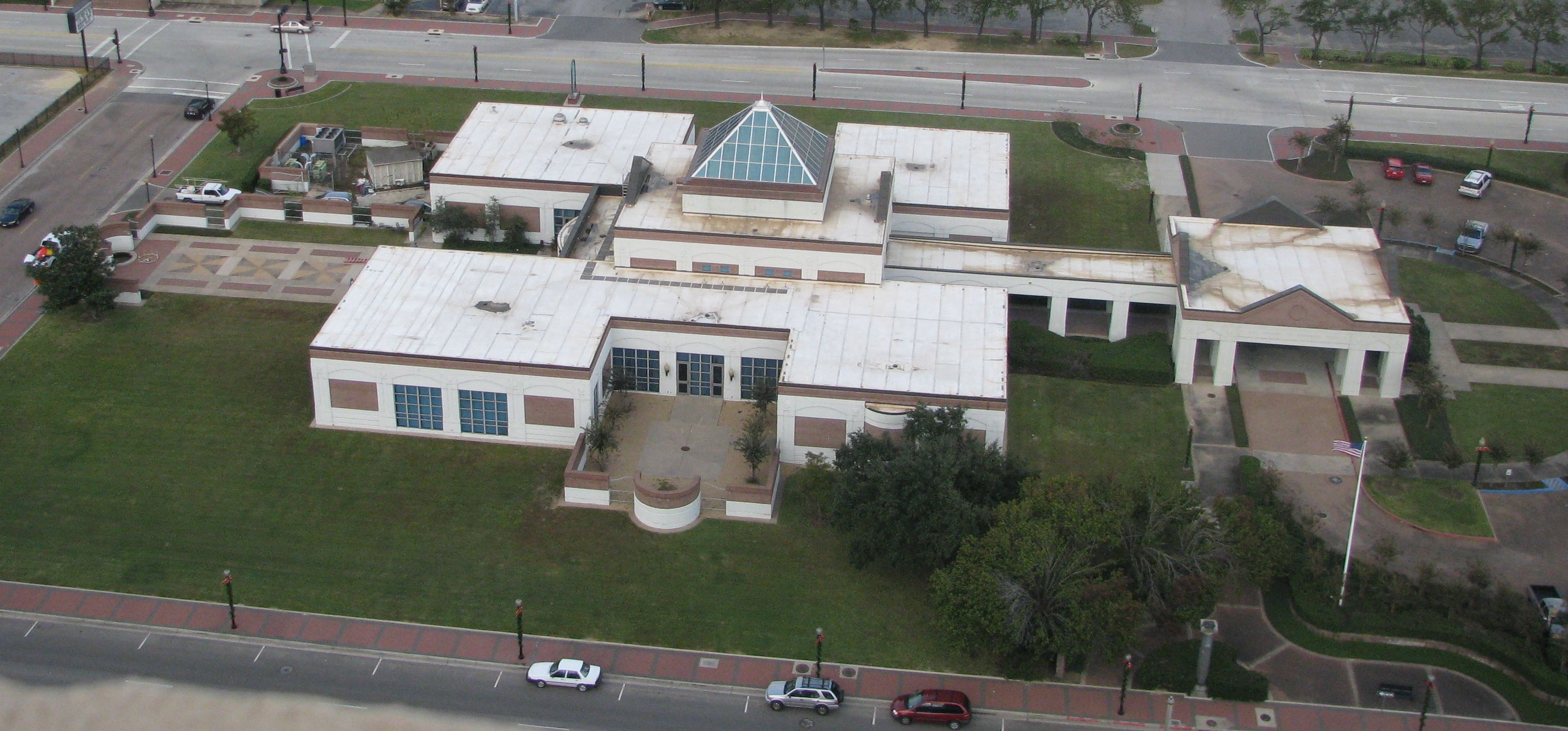
Art Museum of Southeast Texas, notice the last remaining column from the Perlstein Building.

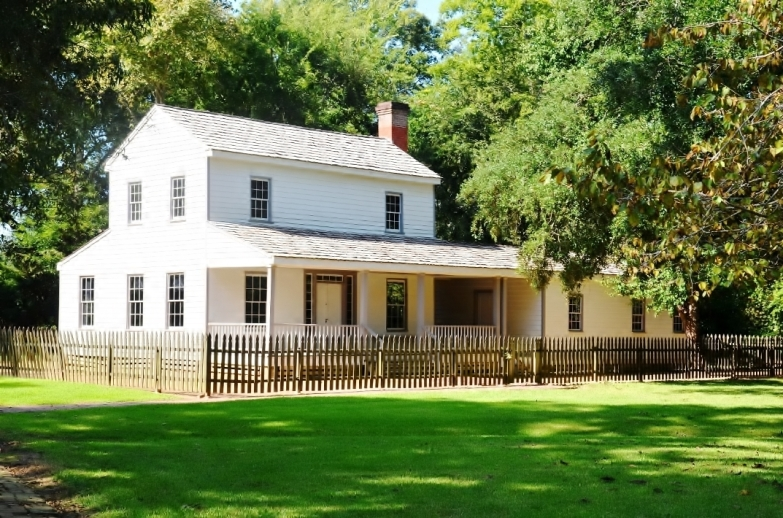
John Jay French Museum

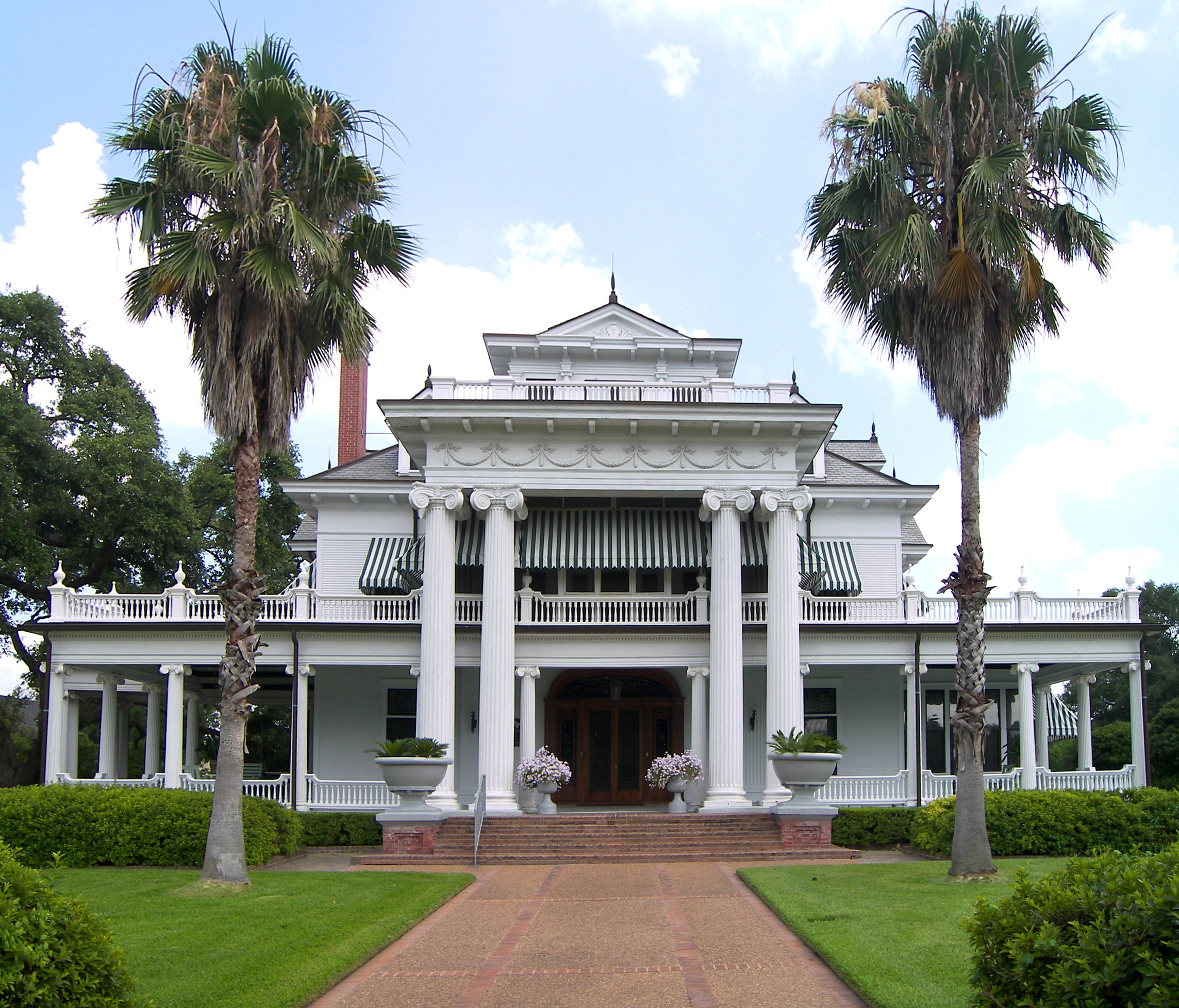
McFaddin-Ward House

Beaumont hosts many museums and buildings open for tours within the Southeast Texas region. The Art Museum of Southeast Texas (AMSET), with its Perlstein Plaza, was dedicated in memory of pioneer real estate developer Hyman Asher Perlstein (1869–1947), who arrived in Beaumont in 1889 as a poor Jewish immigrant from Lithuania and eventually became one of the city's major builders. The museum stands on the site of the Perlstein building, which was the tallest structure between Houston and New Orleans when it was erected in 1907. Only one column still remains from the building. AMSET, formerly the Beaumont Art Museum, exhibits 19th–21st century American art with a collecting focus on Texas art and Folk Art and offers 10–14 educational programs in any given year. Admission is free, and is the only museum open seven days per week. Likewise, Beaumont Children's Museum started in 2008 and opened in 2012; the museum moved to a temporary location in 2015 to the Beaumont Civic Center. Babe Didrikson Zaharias Museum is another notable museum dedicated to the life of the Beaumont native and accomplished athlete.

The Beaumont Art League is the oldest non-profit art gallery in the area, operating for 70 years. The two gallery spaces (at the old Fairgrounds on Gulf Street) host art exhibitions and juried shows year-round, including the notable BAL National Exhibition (formerly the Tri-State Show), which attracts artists from across the country. Within the city, the historic Chambers House, built in 1906, this home is open for tours. It is filled with period furniture, personal items, and artifacts used in the home.

Among other museums, Clifton Steamboat Museum opened on October 26, 1995. The theme of the museum is "Heroes... Past, Present, and Future", honoring military and civilian heroes. The Clifton Steamboat Museum consists of a 24,000 square feet (2,200 m^{2}), two-story museum. Exhibits bring to life the wars fought in Southeast Texas and Louisiana, as well as the Steamboat Era, World Wars I and II, Korea, and Vietnam. Upper art galleries of the museum feature original bronze sculptures; Native American artists, wildlife, and frontier paintings from famous artists. A special gallery in the museum is dedicated to the Boy Scouts of America. This gallery features many historical scouting artifacts, some dating before the 1960s. The tugboat, Hercules, 36 feet (11 m) high, 22 feet (6.7 m) wide, and 92 feet (28 m) long, is included on the museum tour.

Dishman Art Museum is the university art museum of Lamar University. The museum features 19th and 20th century European and American Art, as well as Tribal Art from Africa and New Guinea. Nearby Edison Museum (about inventor Thomas Edison) and the Fire Museum of Texas (home of one of world's largest fire hydrants) are also located within the city. Antique fire trucks and equipment at the Fire Museum of Texas chronicle the history of firefighting in Texas.

The McFaddin-Ward House was built in 1905–1906 in the Beaux-Arts Colonial style and is located in the Oaks Historic District. The structure and its furnishings reflect the prominent family who lived in the house for seventy-five years. This very large historic home has a substantial carriage house. The complex has a substantial permanent collection of antique furniture and household items. Educational programs focus on history and are geared toward children and adults. Spindletop-Gladys City Boomtown Museum includes several reconstructed buildings reminiscent of the original Gladys City. The buildings contain artifacts from the period. The Texas Energy Museum of Beaumont opened on January 10, 1990, the anniversary of the Spindletop gusher.

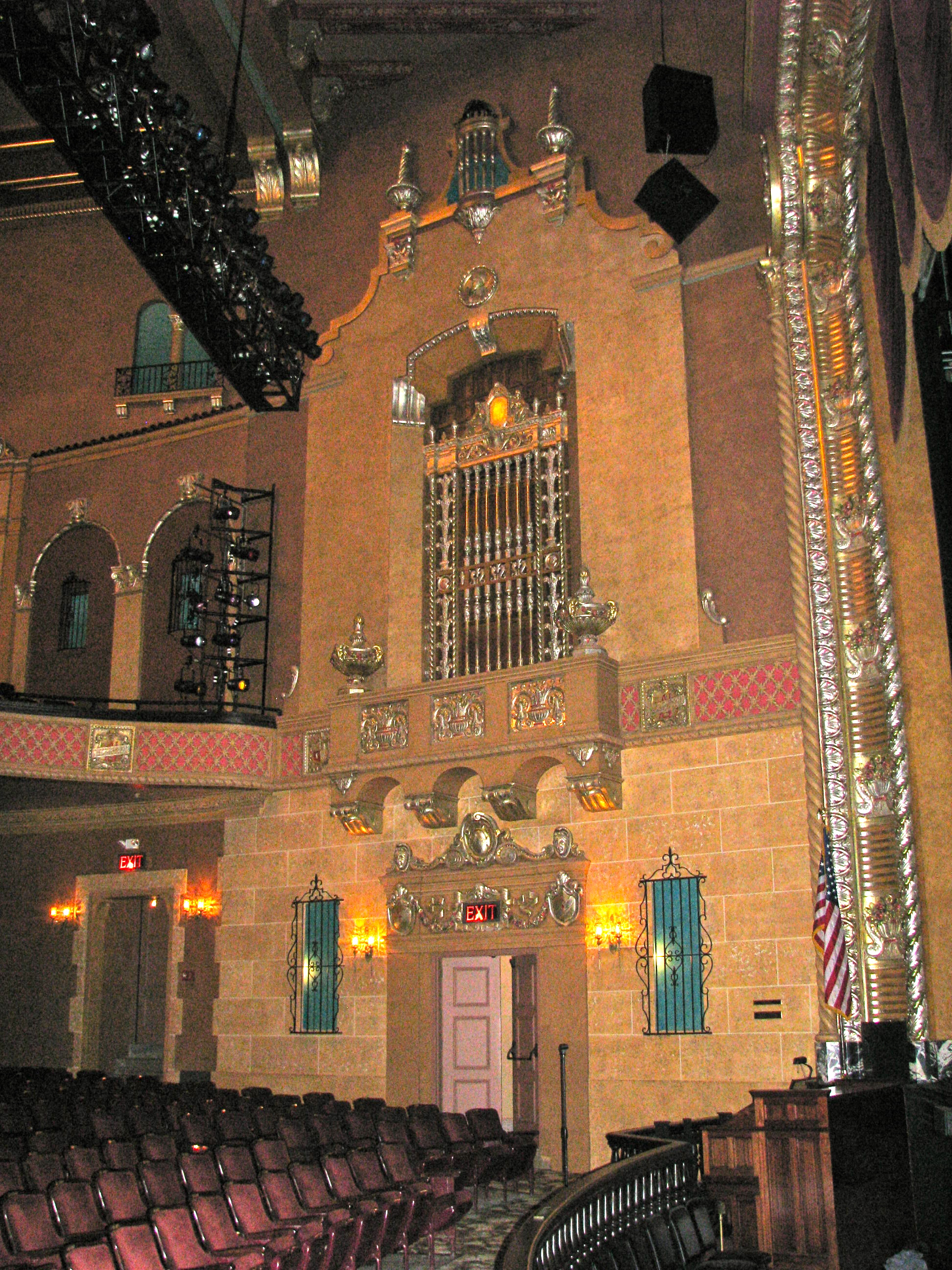
Jefferson Theatre

Jefferson Theater, built in 1927, is a historic theater that presents live musical and stage performances as well as limited revival screenings of classic films. It is listed on the National Register of Historic Places (NRHP) and recognized also as a Recorded Texas Historic Landmark. Founded in 1953 as the Beaumont Symphony Orchestra, the Symphony of Southeast Texas has been performing several performances each year since then. Several guest artists including Van Cliburn and Ferrante & Teicher have appeared with the symphony.

=== Tourism and recreation ===
The Beaumont Botanical Gardens is located near the entrance to the 500 acre Tyrrell Park. On its 23.5 acre grounds, it includes over ten themed gardens, the 10,000 sq ft Warren Loose Conservatory and a large collection of bromeliads. Additionally, Tyrrell Park and Cattail Marsh features botanical gardens and conservatory, the Henry Homberg Municipal Golf Course, a 900-acre cattail marsh nature area, and a 2.8 mile nature trail. There are also restrooms, shelters, the Babe Zaharias Drive Monument, baseball backstop, lighted basketball goals, benches, drinking fountains, 2.8-mile (4.5 km) nature trail, and picnic tables.

As downtown Beaumont is the center of business for the metropolitan statistical area, governance and night time entertainment within Southeast Texas, downtown features the Crockett Street Entertainment Complex with entertainment options from dancing, to live music to dining or a bar. In addition to the night time entertainment downtown also features a museum district with five distinct museums. Other entertainment and recreation venues located downtown include the following: Beaumont Civic Center; the Event Centre and plaza features include a twelve-acre great lawn for concerts and a walking path, and a 3,800 sq ft canopy with stage overlooks the great lawn, and a 14,000 sq ft canopy overlooks a two-acre lake with a thirty-five foot fountain; and Beautiful Mountain Skate Plaza, opened in 2013. The park includes ledges, rails, banks, bank-to-bank, quarter pipes, and stairs. The park also has an amphitheater for other events.

== Sports ==
Beaumont has had a number of professional and amateur sports teams throughout the city's history. The American Basketball Association's Southeast Texas Mavericks were once headquartered in the city until moving to Shreveport, Louisiana in 2013. The Texas Strikers, a professional arena soccer team PASL, started playing at Ford Arena in 2012. Another notable team in the area has been the Beaumont Exporters, a minor league baseball team that played at Magnolia Ballpark and the Stuart Stadium from 1920 to 1949 and 1953–1955.

The Beaumont Golden Gators were a minor league baseball team that played at Vincent-Beck Stadium from 1983 to 1986. The Beaumont Bullfrogs were also a minor league baseball team that played in Beaumont. The Texas Wildcatters were an ECHL Hockey team based in Beaumont from 2003 to 2008. The Beaumont Drillers were an IPFL football team that played in Beaumont from 2003 to 2007, and The Basketball League planned to add the Beaumont Panthers as a new team in 2022.

=== University sports ===
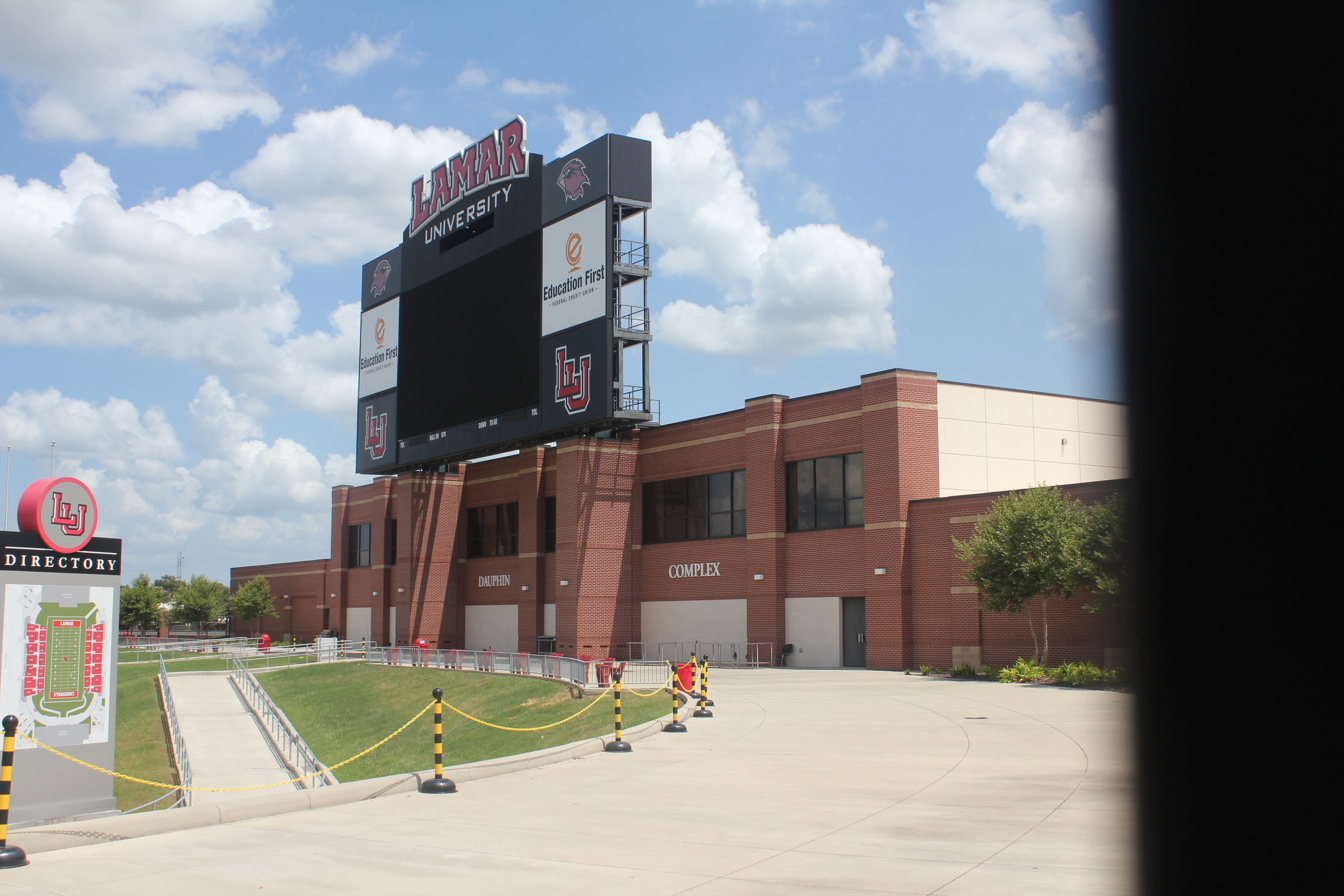
Athletic complex at Lamar University

The sports teams of Lamar University compete in Division I NCAA athletics as the Lamar Cardinals. The athletics program is a full member of the Southland Conference; the Cardinals and Lady Cardinals compete in 17 varsity sports. The Cardinals Basketball team plays in the Montagne Center and Cardinals Baseball Team plays in Vincent-Beck Stadium.

The university brought back football in 2010; as part of the return, Provost Umphrey Stadium was completely renovated. The return was official when the Cardinals Football team played its first game in 21 years in the fall of 2010. The team currently competes in the Southland Conference as a member of the NCAA Division I Football Championship Subdivision (formerly Division I-AA).

== Government ==
=== Politics ===
Beaumont is a council–manager form of government. Elections are held annually, with the mayor and council members each serving two-year terms. All powers of the city are vested in the council, which enacts local legislation, adopts budgets, and determines policies. Council is also responsible for appointing the city attorney, the city clerk and magistrates, and the city manager. The city council is composed of two council members elected at-large, and four council members each elected from single-member districts, the four Wards of the city.

According to the city's 2015 Comprehensive Annual Financial Report, the city's various funds had $219.0 million in revenues, $202.8 million in expenditures, $900.1 million in total assets, $586.8 million in total liabilities, and $202.2 million in cash and investments.

Government structure for Beaumont
| Position | Name | Elected to Current Position | Areas Represented Council Districts |
|---|---|---|---|
| Mayor | Roy West | 2023–present | Citywide |
| At Large Position 1 | A.J. Turner | 2021–present | Citywide |
| At Large Position 2 | Mike Williams | 2025–present | Citywide |
| Ward 1 | Cory Crenshaw | 2025–present | North Beaumont |
| Ward 2 | Joey Hilliard | 2025–present | West Beaumont |
| Ward 3 | LaDonna Sherwood | 2025–present | Central Beaumont |
| Ward 4 | Charles “Chris” Durio | 2021–present | South Beaumont |

Mayors of Beaumont, Texas

| Image | Mayor | Years | Notes |
|---|---|---|---|
| | Alexander Calder | circa 1840 | |
| | ? | | |
| | Archibald N. Vaughan | circa 1860 | |
| | ? | | |
| | John C. Craig | 1881–1882 | |
| | C.C. Caswell | 1882–1883 | |
| | John W. Keith | 1883–1884 | |
| | ? | | |
| | Benjamin F. Calhoun | 1886–1887 | |
| | J. Fisher Lanier | 1887 | |
| | A.S. John | 1887–1889 | |
| | Alexander Wynne | 1889–1892 | |
| | W.A. Ives | 1892–1896 | |
| | John H. Eastham | 1896–1898 | |
| | Daniel P. Wheat | 1898–1902 | |
| | Thomas H. Langham | 1902–1906 | |
| | Emmett E. Fletcher | 1906–1918 | |
| | E.J. Diffenbacher | 1918–1920 | |
| | B.A. Steinhagen | 1920–1924 | |
| | J. Austin Barnes | 1924–1928 | |
| | Edgar W. Gross | 1928–1929 | |
| | Leroy W. King | 1929 | |
| | Clarence M. White | 1929–1930 | |
| | Emmett E. Fletcher (2nd term) | 1930–1934 | |
| | P. D. Renfro | 1934–1938 | |
| | Ray A. Coale | 1938–1940 | |
| | George W. Morgan | 1940–1942 | |
| | Leslie D. Lowry | 1942–1943 | |
| | Ray A. Coale (2nd term) | 1943–1944 | |
| | Fred C. Stone | 1944–1947 | |
| | Otho Plummer | 1947–1954 | |
| | Elmo R. Beard | 1954–1956 | |
| | Jimmie P. Cokinos | 1956–1960 | |
| | Jack M. Moore | 1962–1968 | |
| | James D. McNicholas | 1968–1970 | |
| | Ken Ritter | 1970–1978 | |
| | Maury Meyers | 1978–1982 | |
| | William E. "Bill" Neild | 1982–1986 | |
| | Maury Meyers (2nd term) | 1986–1990 | |
| | Evelyn Lord | 1990–1994 | |
| | David Moore | 1994–2002 | |
| | Evelyn Lord (2nd term) | 2002–2005 | |
| | Guy N. Goodson | 2005–2007 | |
| | Becky Ames | 2007–2021 | |
| | Robin Mouton | 2021–2023 | |
| | Roy West | 2023–Present | |

=== State and federal facilities ===
The Texas Department of Transportation operates the Beaumont District Office in Beaumont. The Texas Ninth Court of Appeals is located in the Jefferson County Courthouse in Beaumont. The Texas Department of Criminal Justice (TDCJ) operates the Beaumont District Parole Office in Beaumont. The Texas Department of Corrections operates three facilities of various custody types in unincorporated areas of Jefferson County, with a total capacity of about 7500 inmates. The Federal Bureau of Prisons is also in the city and operates the Beaumont Federal Correctional Complex in an unincorporated area in Jefferson County, south of Beaumont.

== Education ==
=== Colleges and universities ===
==== Lamar University ====
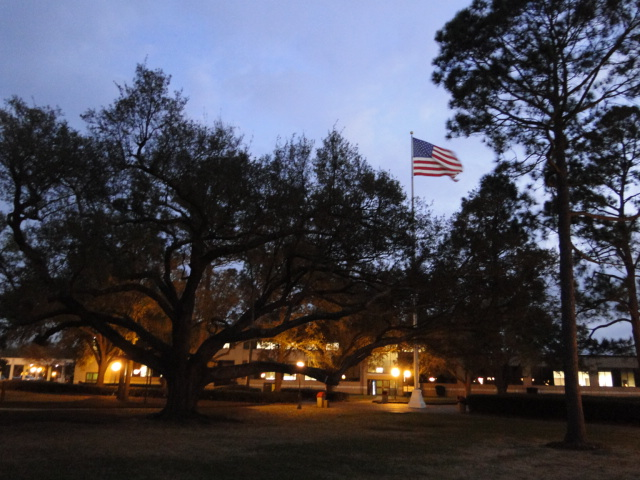
Lucas Building at sunset

Beaumont has one state university, Lamar University, which is a part of the Texas State University System. Lamar University was established in 1923 as South Park Junior College. The university is classified as a national university. It is also classified as a "Doctoral Research University – Moderate Research Activity" by the Carnegie Foundation. With over 100 degrees offered, the university's main academic offerings are in business, nursing, teaching and engineering. Lamar University's enrollment has grown tremendously in the first decade of the 21st century. This has prompted a building boom at the campus. The school's enrollment as of Fall, 2015 was above 14,966 students.

==== Lamar Institute of Technology ====
Lamar Institute of Technology, located directly adjacent to Lamar University, serves as the region's technical college for two-year degrees and certificates. Originally a part of Lamar University and its predecessors since 1923, Lamar Institute of Technology was chartered in 1949 when the Lamar College Bill was passed. The bill was sponsored in the Texas Legislature by State Representative Jack Brooks and Senator W.R. Cousins, Jr. of Beaumont. Lamar Institute of Technology became a separate entity in 1995. As of Fall, 2014, enrollment totaled 2,920 students.

The Texas Legislature specifies community college districts for most places in Texas; as of 2026 it has not directly assigned most of Jefferson County, including Beaumont, to a specific community college district.

=== Primary and secondary schools ===
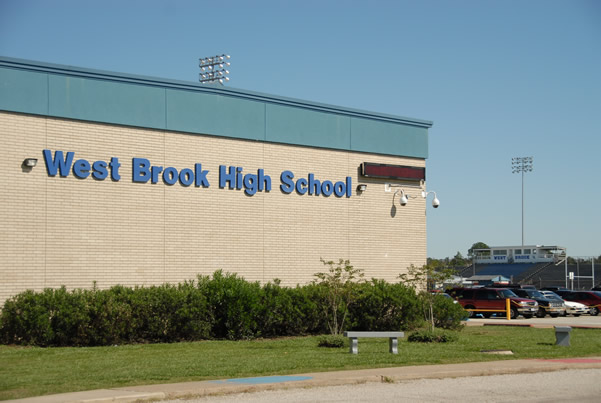
West Brook Senior High School

Beaumont is served by the Beaumont Independent School District, though there are also several private schools in the city and metropolitan area.

BISD high schools

- West Brook High School
- Beaumont United High School
- King Collegiate Academy

Public school established by the state legislature

- Texas Academy of Leadership in the Humanities

The Roman Catholic Diocese of Beaumont runs three Catholic elementary schools in Beaumont, St. Anne Catholic School, St. Anthony Cathedral Catholic School, and Our Mother of Mercy Catholic School. Monsignor Kelly Catholic High School is the city's lone Catholic high school. Legacy Christian Academy, on Highway 105, enrolls PK–3 through 12th grade.

Residents who live in Beaumont's extraterritorial jurisdiction are zoned either to Hamshire-Fannett Independent School District (south of Beaumont) or Hardin-Jefferson Independent School District (west of Major Drive and Highway 90).

== Media ==
=== Newspapers ===
The Beaumont Enterprise is the only daily newspaper serving Beaumont. Operating since 1880 The Enterprise is one of the oldest continually operated businesses in Beaumont. It is operated by the Hearst Corporation. Two weekly publications The Examiner and The Southeast Texas Record serve Beaumont and the area. The Examiner is primarily an investigative reporting paper. The Southeast Texas Record is a legal journal that covers Jefferson and Orange County courts.

=== Television ===
| Channel | Call Sign | Network | Subchannels |
|---|---|---|---|
| 4 | KBTV | Roar (O&O) | Charge! on 4.2, Comet TV on 4.3, The Nest on 4.4, Dabl on 4.5 |
| 6 | KFDM | CBS | The CW Plus on 6.2, Fox on 6.3 |
| 12 | KBMT | ABC | NBC on 12.2, Cozi TV on 12.3, MeTV on 12.4, True Crime on 12.7, Quest on 12.8, 365BLK on 12.16 |
| 22 | KUMY-LD | NewsNet | |
| 27 | KAOB-LD | Heartland | Vidor Television on 27.2, The Family Channel on 27.3, Familia TV on 27.4, Rev'n on 27.5, Retro Television Network on 27.6, KHTW Audio Simulcast on 27.7 |
| 33 | KGEW-LD | Telemundo | 33.1 Telemundo, 33.2 Ion Plus, 33.3 Bounce TV, 33.4 Ion Mystery, 33.5 Daystar Español |
| 34 | KITU-TV | TBN (O&O) | Hillsong Channel on 34.2, Smile on 34.3, Enlace on 34.4, Positiv on 34.5 |

Lamar University's video services, LUTV and LUTV Channel 7, (respectively) provide C-SPAN-like coverage on local government proceedings and original programming from students. Neither channel has an over the air channel and are available only on cable TV.

The region currently has no PBS member station of its own; KUHT on channel 8 (licensed to Houston, which is carried on cable and satellite providers in most of the market) and KLTL on channel 18 (a Louisiana Public Broadcasting member station licensed to Lake Charles, which is carried on cable providers in the market's extreme eastern portions) do not reach the area. KUHT has a construction permit for a digital translator on RF 24, which would share KFDM's antenna on 25, but the University of Houston has had financial cutbacks and recently cancelled a translator application in Victoria. What outcome this will have on the Beaumont facility remains to be seen.

=== Radio ===
Radio stations that were licensed in the Greater Houston area (mainly the Senior Road Tower) are barely perceptible in most of the Beaumont area.

| Frequency | Call letters / licensed to (if not Beaumont) | Format | Owner | Notes |
|---|---|---|---|---|
| 560 | KLVI | News, Talk radio | iHeartMedia | |
| 990 | KZZB | Gospel "Gospel 990" | Martin Broadcasting | |
| 1150 | KBPO (Port Neches) | Spanish-language Christian Radio | Christian Ministries of the Valley | |
| 1250 | KDEI (Port Arthur) | Catholic radio | Radio Maria | |
| 1300 | KHTW (Lumberton) | Conservative talk | | |
| 1340 | KOLE (Port Arthur) | Various | Birach Broadcasting | |
| 1450 | KIKR | silent | | |
| 1510 | KBED (Nederland) | silent | | |
| 1600 | KOGT (Orange) | silent | | |
| 88.1 | KLBT | Contemporary Christian | The King's Musician Educational Foundation | |
| 88.5 | KGHY | Southern Gospel "The Gospel Highway" | CCS Radio | |
| 89.7 | KTXB | Christian radio "Family Radio" | Family Stations | |
| 90.5 | KZFT (Fannett) | Christian radio | AFR | |
| 91.3 | KVLU | Public Radio | Lamar University | |
| 92.5 | KCOL (Groves) | Classic hits "Cool 92.5" | iHeartMedia | |
| 93.3 | KESS (Port Arthur) | Regional Mexican "Que Buena 93.3" | Univision | |
| 94.1 | KQXY | CHR "Q94" | Cumulus Broadcasting | |
| 95.1 | KYKR | Country "Kicker 95.1" | iHeartMedia | |
| 97.1 | KLVH (Cleveland) | Contemporary Christian "K-Love" | Educational Media Foundation | |
| 97.5 | KFNC (Mont Belvieu) | Sports "ESPN 97.5" | Gow Media-Houston | |
| 98.5 | KTJM (Port Arthur) | Regional Mexican "La Raza 98.5/103.3" | Liberman Broadcasting-Houston | |
| 99.9 | KHIH (Liberty) | Contemporary Christian "KSBJ" | KSBJ Educational Foundation, Inc. | |
| 100.7 | KKHT (Lumberton) | Christian radio "100.7 The Word" | Salem Broadcasting | |
| 101.7 | KAYD (Silsbee) | Country "KD101" | Cumulus Broadcasting | |
| 102.5 | KTCX | Urban contemporary "Magic 102.5" | Cumulus Broadcasting | |
| 103.3 | K277AG | Hip-Hop, R&B "The Beat 103.3" | iHeartMedia | Simulcast of KKMY-HD2 |
| 104.5 (Orange) | KKMY | Rhythmic CHR "104.5 Kiss FM" | iHeartMedia | |
| 105.3 | KLTW (Winnie) | Spanish-language contemporary Christian "Radio Nueva Vida" | Educational Media Foundation | |
| 106.1 | KIOC (Orange) | Rock "Big Dog 106" | iHeartMedia | |
| 106.9 | KHPT (Conroe) | Classic Rock "The Eagle 106.9" (107.5 simulcast KGLK) | Urban One | |
| 107.9 | KQQK | Regional Mexican "107.9 El Norte" | Liberman Broadcasting-Houston | |

== Transportation ==
Jack Brooks Regional Airport (BPT), located 9 miles (14 km) south of Beaumont's central business district, serves the region with regional jet flights nonstop to Dallas/Fort Worth Airport (DFW), Texas with this scheduled passenger service being operated by American Eagle on behalf of American Airlines. The Beaumont Municipal Airport (BMT) near the western city limit is available for general aviation travel.

The Port of Beaumont is located on the Neches River at Beaumont.

Amtrak's Sunset Limited train serves the Beaumont train station.

The city operates the Beaumont Municipal Transit System (BMT), a citywide bus system.

=== Major highways ===
I-10
US 69
US 90
US 96
US 287

== Notable people ==
For a more extensive list of people associated with Beaumont, Texas see: People from Beaumont, Texas

- Terrance Arceneaux, College Basketball Player at NC State
- Chip Ambres, Major League Baseball player
- Kelly Asbury, film director, writer, illustrator and voice actor
- Doug Ault, Major League Baseball player
- Melvin Baker, football player
- Jerry Ball, football player for SMU and in NFL, 3-time Pro Bowl selection; born in Beaumont
- Vance Bedford, football coach
- Charlotte Beers, businesswoman and former Under Secretary of State
- Jan van Beveren, Dutch soccer player (goalkeeper)
- Angela Blanchard, CEO and president of BakerRipley
- Squire Booker, biochemist at Penn State University
- James Brown, starting quarterback of Texas Longhorns from 1994 to 1997
- Ben Broussard, Major League Baseball first baseman
- Jay Bruce, Major League Baseball player, three-time All-Star; born in Beaumont
- James Busceme, boxer who fought Alexis Argüello for world title in 1982
- Wayde Butler, football player
- Tommy Byars, motorcycle racer and dealer
- Tracy Byrd, country music artist; grew up in Vidor
- Mark Chesnutt, country music artist; grew up in Nederland
- Robert Crippen, astronaut
- Tiffany Derry, celebrity chef, Top Chef contestant and fan favorite winner
- Floyd Dixon, professional football player
- Earl Dotson, professional football player
- Paul Durousseau, serial killer known as the Jacksonville Strangler
- Mark Damon Espinoza, actor
- Mel Farr, football player, UCLA, first-round draft choice of Detroit Lions, NFL Rookie if the Year; born in Beaumont
- Miller Farr, NFL player, first-round draft choice, three-time AFL All-Star; born in Beaumont
- Debra Jo Fondren, model and actress, lived in Beaumont
- Lew Ford, Major League Baseball player
- Herman Fontenot, NFL player
- Larry Graham, bass player for Sly and The Family Stone, pioneered "slapping" technique, founder and frontman of Graham Central Station
- Irma P. Hall, actress in Soul Food, The Lady Killers, and many other movies
- Detrick Hughes, poet, author
- Shamsud-Din Bahar Jabbar, perpetrator of the 2025 New Orleans truck attack
- Harry James, musician and bandleader in Grammy Hall of Fame
- Blind Willie Johnson, Baptist minister and seminal gospel/blues bottle-neck guitarist
- George Jones, country music artist
- Louie Kelcher, NFL player, 4-time All-Pro for San Diego Chargers; born in Beaumont
- Jerry LeVias, college and NFL football player, member of the College Football Hall of Fame.
- Bruce Lietzke, professional golfer, 22 victories, member of winning 1981 Ryder Cup team
- Arlon Lindner, Minnesota state representative and businessman
- Barbara Lynn, R&B music artist
- Masada, pro wrestler
- Christine Michael, Texas A&M running back
- Kevin Millar, Major League Baseball player; played in college for Lamar
- Frank Middleton, NFL player
- Roger Mobley, child actor; police officer in Beaumont
- Vamsi Mootha, Indian-American physician-scientist
- David Ozio, bowler, won 11 titles on PBA Tour; executive at Etonic Shoe Company
- Max Neuhaus, sound installation artist
- William New Jr., bioengineer and electrical engineer
- Kendrick Perkins, NBA player; member of 2008 NBA champion Boston Celtics
- Mark Petkovsek, Major League Baseball player
- Dade Phelan, Speaker of the Texas House of Representatives, and Republican representative from District 21; real estate developer born in Beaumont
- Bob Pollard, NFL player
- Kheeston Randall, football player
- Taylor Reed, football player
- J.P. Richardson, "The Big Bopper", DJ, rock & roll singer, killed with Buddy Holly and Ritchie Valens in 1959 plane crash
- Allan Ritter, member of Texas House of Representatives from Jefferson and Orange counties, born in Beaumont
- Frank Robinson (1935–2019), Major League Baseball player and manager, member of Hall of Fame; born in Beaumont
- Kevin Russell, musician, born and raised in Beaumont
- Brian Sanches, Major League Baseball player; grew up in Nederland, TX
- Bubba Smith, football player, College Football Hall of Fame, Super Bowl V champion in NFL and actor
- Tom Tierney, noted paper doll artist, cartoonist, and painter
- Billy Tubbs, basketball coach at Lamar, Texas Christian and Oklahoma University, 1988 NCAA Final Four
- Teezo Touchdown, rapper, singer and songwriter
- Jason Tyner, Major League Baseball player
- Helen Vinson, actress, appeared in more than 40 films between 1932 and 1945; born in Beaumont
- Clay Walker, country music artist; grew up in Vidor, Texas
- Ben Wells, defensive back for CFL's Montreal Alouettes
- Edgar Winter, rock music artist, brother to Johnny Winter; born in Beaumont
- Johnny Winter, blues and rock music artist, brother to Edgar Winter; born in Beaumont
- Will Wynn, former mayor of Austin
- Mildred Ella ("Babe") Didrikson Zaharias, Olympic champion athlete and Hall of Fame pro golfer; one of the founders of LPGA
- Gus Zernial, Major League Baseball player, 1951 American League home run leader; born in Beaumont

== See also ==
- List of museums in East Texas
- Ashworth Act
- List of U.S. cities with large Black populations
