= Hotel Beaumont =

Historic hotel in Texas, US

- U.S. Historic district – Contributing property
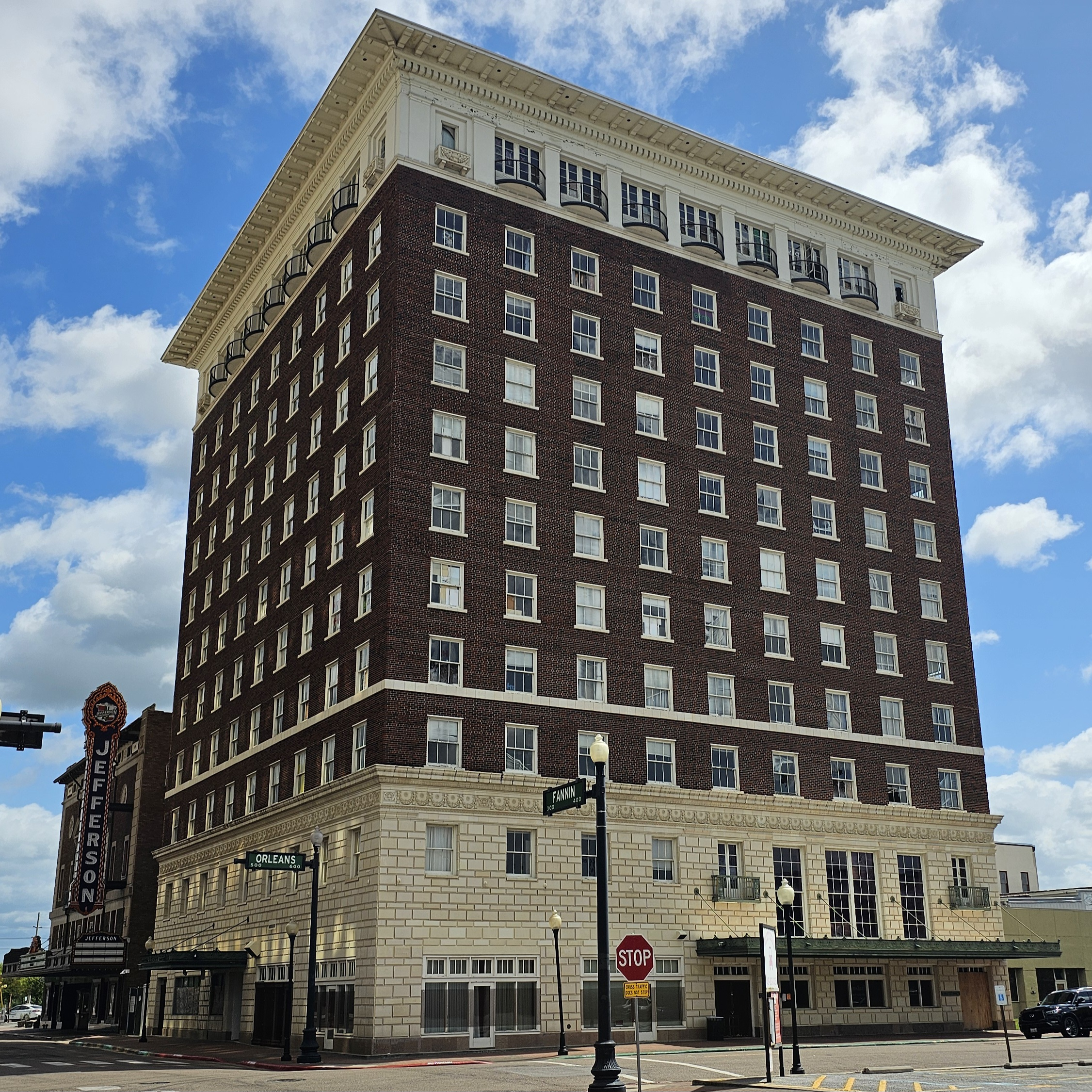
- The building in 2024
- Location: 625 Orleans St., Beaumont, Texas
- Coordinates: 30°4′54.5″N 94°5′53″W
- Area: less than one acre
- Built: 1922
- Architectural style: Beaux-Arts
- Part of: Beaumont Commercial District (ID78002959)
- Designated CP: April 14, 1978

The Hotel Beaumont is a historic, currently vacant hotel structure on Orleans Street near Pearl Street (U.S. Route 90) in Beaumont, Texas.

== History ==
The Hotel Beaumont was built in 1922, at a cost of $1 million, by a group of 277 investors. The 11-story hotel had 250 rooms and two ballrooms, the Rose Room, and the Sky Room on the roof.

The building was used as a retirement community from 1977–2011.

The building was sold at auction in 2014. It was sold again in 2019 to developer Mack Patel, who announced plans to renovate it as a 138-room hotel. In 2023, it was reported that the renovations had been delayed by the COVID-19 pandemic, but that they are still paneled in the near future.

== See also ==
- National Register of Historic Places listings in Jefferson County, Texas
