= Maury Meyers =

American politician

- Born: Maurice Meyers; April 16, 1932; Bal Harbour, New York, United States
- Died: June 15, 2014 (aged 82); Beaumont, Texas, United States
- Occupation: Politician

Maurice "Maury" Meyers (April 16, 1932 – June 15, 2014) was an American politician who served four non-consecutive terms (1978–1980, 1980–1982, 1986–1988 and 1988–1990) as Mayor of Beaumont, Texas. He is well known in the city as a progressive and economic mind, who helped turn the city of Beaumont into an allegedly thriving community. Maury also led the charge to desegregate the school systems in Beaumont while in office. In 1990 he ran for congress as a Republican against the long-time Democratic incumbent, Jack Brooks. Meyers would lose 58% to 42%. He again thought about running for mayor in the early 2000s, but declined when his battle with Parkinson's disease made it unsafe to do so. The same Parkinson's disease led to his death in June 2014. He was survived by his wife Arline, his son (Casey), and four daughters (Ellen, Peggy, Nancy and Jamie.) In April 2025, Meyers' namesake bridge in the city was demolished

== See also ==
- List of mayors of Beaumont, Texas
