= William New Jr. =

American bioengineer and electrical engineer

- Born: April 29, 1942; Beaumont, Texas, U.S.
- Died: December 21, 2017 (aged 75); San Francisco, California, U.S.
- Education: Stanford University; Duke University; University of California, Los Angeles
- Occupations: Bioengineer, electrical engineer

William New Jr. (April 29, 1942 – December 21, 2017) was an American bioengineer and electrical engineer.

== Life and career ==
New was born in Beaumont, Texas, the son of William Sr., a naval architect, and Dorothy New, an educator. He earned his BS and MS degree in electrical engineering at Stanford University. He also earned his MD degree at Duke University, and his PhD degree in physiology at the University of California, Los Angeles. After earning his degrees, he worked as an electrical engineer at Hewlett-Packard and Ampex.

New worked at Nellcor, and developed the pulse oximeter, a medical device that indirectly monitors the oxygen saturation of a patient's blood. He then researched in bioengineering at Simon Fraser University in British Columbia, and served as chairman of The Novent Group (TNG). During his time at TNG, in 2010, he was elected as a member of the National Academy of Engineering.

== Death ==
New died at his home in San Francisco, California on December 21, 2017, at the age of 75.
