= Evelyn Lord =

American politician (1926–2024)

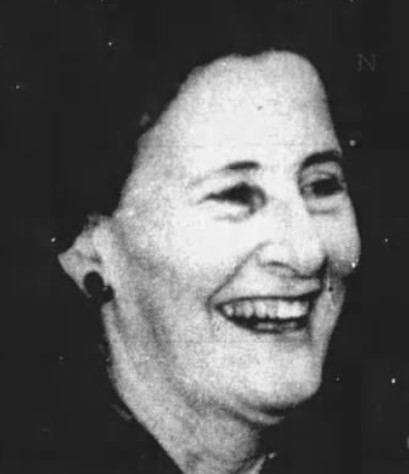
- Lord in 1989

Mayor of Beaumont, Texas
- In office 1990–1994 – 2002–2005

Member of the Delaware Senate
- In office 1962–1964

Personal details
- Born: December 8, 1926
- Died: December 13, 2024 (aged 98)
- Education: Boston University

Evelyn Marlin Lord (December 8, 1926 – December 13, 2024) was an American politician. She was a member of the Delaware Senate (1962–1964) and the first female mayor of Beaumont, Texas (1990–1994, 2002–2005).

== Early life ==
Lord was born in Melrose, Massachusetts to New England-born Mary Janette Nourse and Austrian-born John Joseph Marlin. She grew up in Medford, Massachusetts, and graduated in 1944 from Medford High School and from Boston University in 1948.

== Political career ==
Her work with the League of Women Voters led to her election to the Delaware State Senate. She served two terms as Mayor of Beaumont, Texas.

== Death ==
Lord died on December 13, 2024, at the age of 98.
