= Alexander Calder (mayor) =

American politician

Alexander Calder (c. 1806 – August 23, 1853) was the first mayor of Beaumont, Texas, on August 8, 1840.

Calder grew up in New York but moved to the Beaumont area in 1838. He became the clerk of the county court, and many early Jefferson County, Texas documents are in his handwriting.

Calder won the first mayoral election for the city of Beaumont on July 28, 1840, held under the Incorporation Act. Beaumont had incorporated as a city two years earlier.

Calder had a house at 600 Calder Avenue.

== See also ==
- List of mayors of Beaumont, Texas
- Timeline of Beaumont, Texas
