= Texas Energy Museum =

Museum in Beaumont, Texas

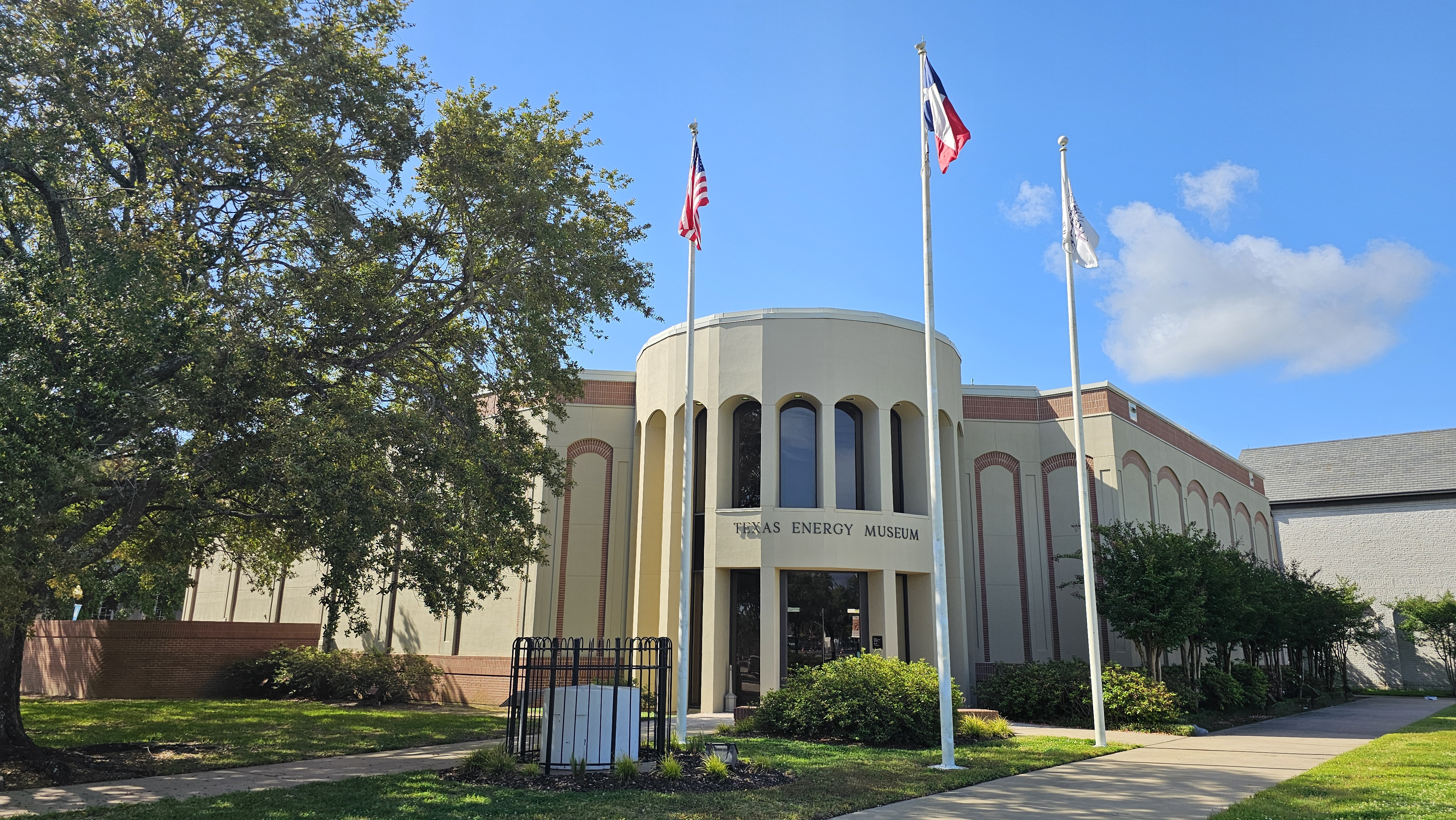
- The museum in 2024

- Texas Energy Museum's location in Texas Texas Energy Museum (the United States)
- Established: 1987
- Location: 600 Main Street, Beaumont, Texas 77701
- Coordinates: 30°04′56.6″N 94°05′47.3″W
- Type: Technology museum
- Collection size: Petroleum technology artifacts - 2,000 items Geology and paleontology specimens - 250; Petroleum well service equipment - 20 items Petroleum exploration equipment - 200 items Household items - 2,000; Research papers relating to Southeast Texas oilfields including Spindletop; Spindletop Oilfield photographs (1901-1902) - 87 images
- Director: D. Ryan Smith
- Public transit access: BMTS; Route #6 (Refinery); Route #7 (South Park); Route #8 (Pear Orchard)
- Parking: Free, adjacent to museum
- Website: Museum website

The Texas Energy Museum is a museum in Beaumont, Texas in the United States. The museum was formed in 1987 to tell the story of oil through state of the art exhibits including talking robotic characters. The museum opened on January 10, 1990, the anniversary of the Spindletop gusher.

The museum is part of a concentration of several museums in the downtown Beaumont area. It is located adjacent to the Tyrrell Historical Library and the Art Museum of Southeast Texas. The Beaumont Children's Museum is temporarily located across the street in the Beaumont Civic Center. The Edison Museum and Fire Museum of Texas are within a few blocks.

== The museum ==
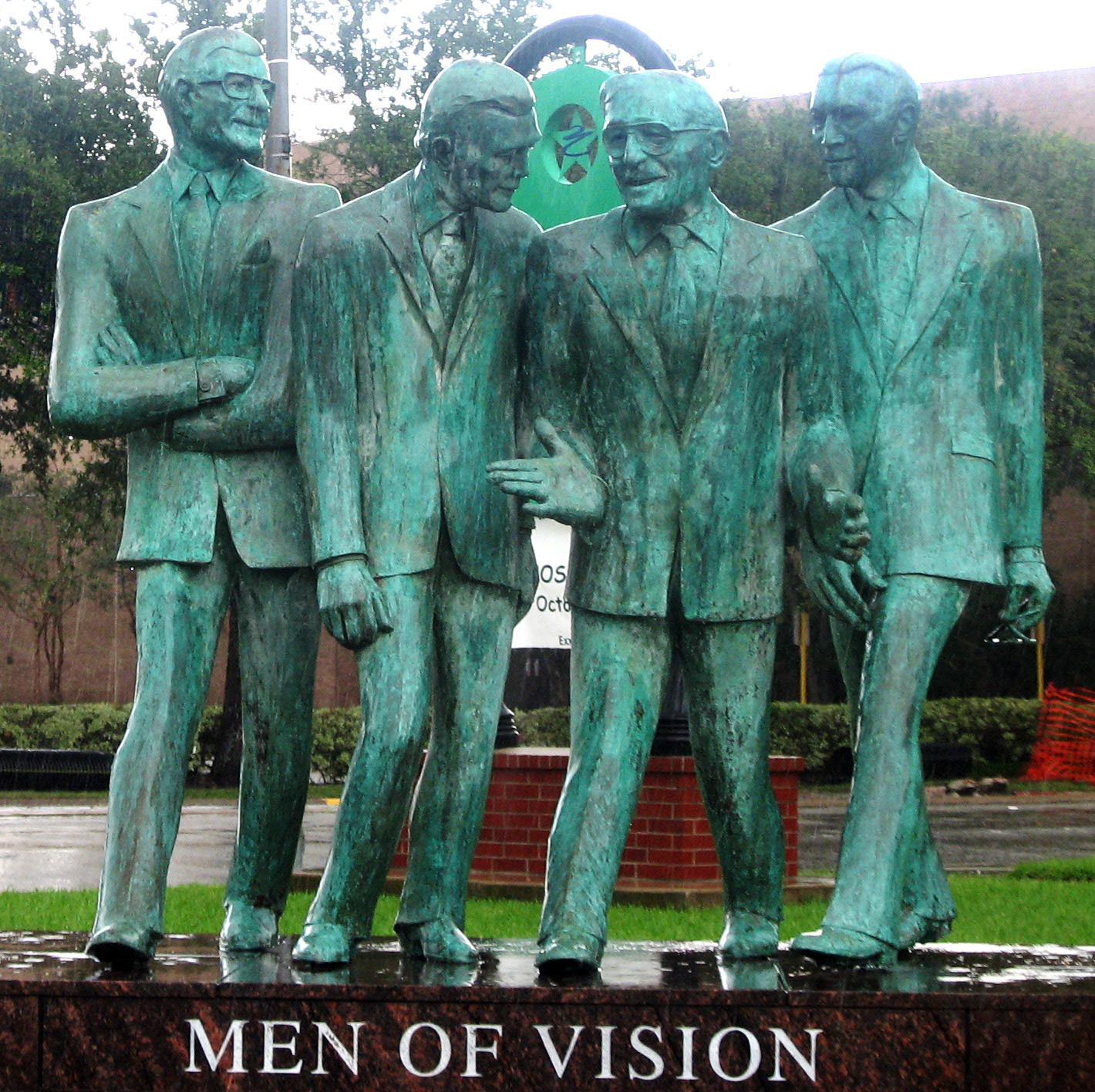
Men of Vision -- Energy Museum -- Beaumont, Texas

The museum has two floors of displays. The interactive exhibits "...focus on the geology, history and production of oil..." The museum has several presentations about the Spindletop oil discovery and production. Collections include a combination of items from the Spindletop Museum of Lamar University and the Western Company of North America Museum.

Museum exhibits include:

- Formation - "Oil was formed over millions of years ago..."
- Exploration - "By studying rock formations...petroleum geologists can predict a potential oil site..."
- Drilling - "The mechanics of oil well drilling are simple..."
- Refining - "...crude oil is transformed into consumer products..."
- Spindletop - "The discovery of oil at Spindletop near Beaumont, Texas in 1901 revolutionized the oil industry..."

== Hours and admission ==
Hours: Tuesday-Saturday 9:00 am – 5:00 pm Sunday 1:00 pm – 5:00 pm

Admission: Adults $5.00, Children (6-12) $3.00, Seniors (65 & over) $3.00

== See also ==
- List of petroleum museums
- American Oil&Gas Historical Society Museums
- List of museums in East Texas
- Spindletop-Gladys City Boomtown Museum
- Spindletop
- Texas oil boom
- Anthony Francis Lucas
- Patillo Higgins
- McFaddin-Ward House History
- McFaddin-Ward House
- Texas History Online - Spindletop Oilfield
- CSpan3 LCV Cities Tour - Beaumont: Texas Energy Museum YouTube video
- CSpan3 LCV Cities Tour - Beaumont: Spindletop YouTube video
- Spindletop Oil Boom YouTube video
