= Downtown Beaumont =

Coordinates: 30.084°N 94.102°W

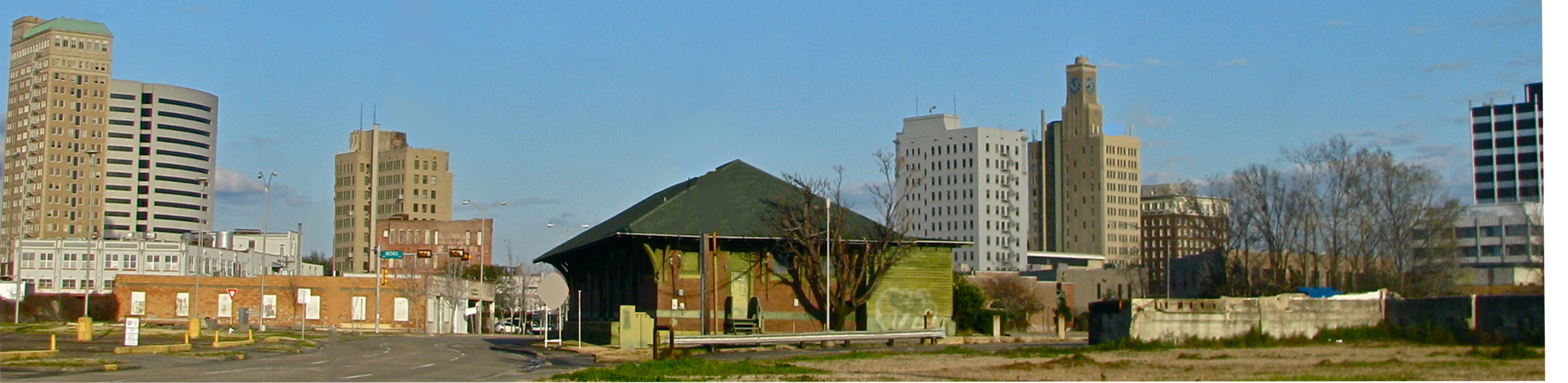
Downtown from the west

Downtown Beaumont is the central business district of Beaumont, Texas. It is where the city's highrise buildings are located, as well as being the center of government and business for the region. Downtown Beaumont is currently experiencing a renaissance, with streets, sidewalks and historic buildings receiving significant attention.

The approximate borders of Downtown are the Neches River to the east. Interstate 10 to the north. Martin Luther King Jr. Parkway to the West and College street to the south.

== Arts and culture ==
Downtown Beaumont is a cultural center for the region. It features most of the region's museums, theaters and historic buildings. Many of the buildings in downtown are on the National Register of Historic Places (NRHP).

=== Beaumont Commercial District ===
The Beaumont Commercial District, located in downtown, consists of various styles of buildings, including six high-rises built before 1932. The district is registered on the NRHP as a U.S. Historic District. The historic district is roughly bounded by Willow, Neches, Gilbert and Main Streets. The Old Spanish Trail (U.S. Route 90) travels through the district on Willow, Park, Pearl and College Streets.

=== Museums ===
The downtown district is home to the city's museum district which features five museums. The Beaumont Children's Museum is temporarily located in the Beaumont Civic Center. It features children's educational activities. The Edison Museum dedicated to inventor Thomas Edison features more than 60 historic objects in its tour and has over 1,400 artifacts of Edison in its possession. The museum also features a reference library. It is the only museum of its kind west of the Mississippi River. The Texas Energy Museum documents the Texas Oil industry and its ties to Beaumont's Spindletop. The museum also has exhibits on the geology and science behind oil deposits. The Fire Museum of Texas is home to the world's largest working fire hydrant and houses a large collection of historic equipment. The Art Museum of Southeast Texas (AMSET) features 1,000 pieces of 19th, 20th and 21st-century American Art plus regional and folk art. AMSET hosts eight to ten traveling exhibits throughout the year.

Museums
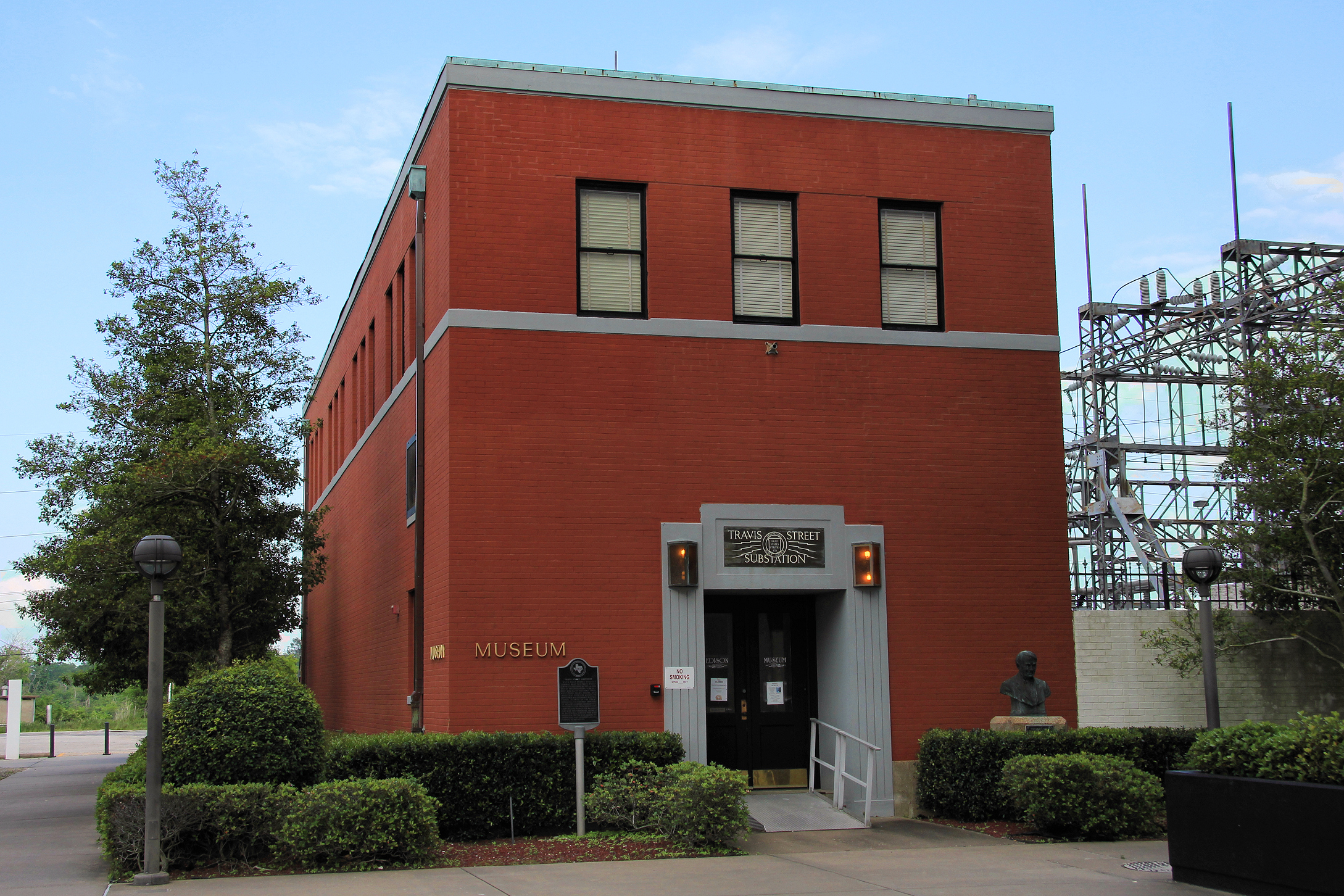
Edison Museum

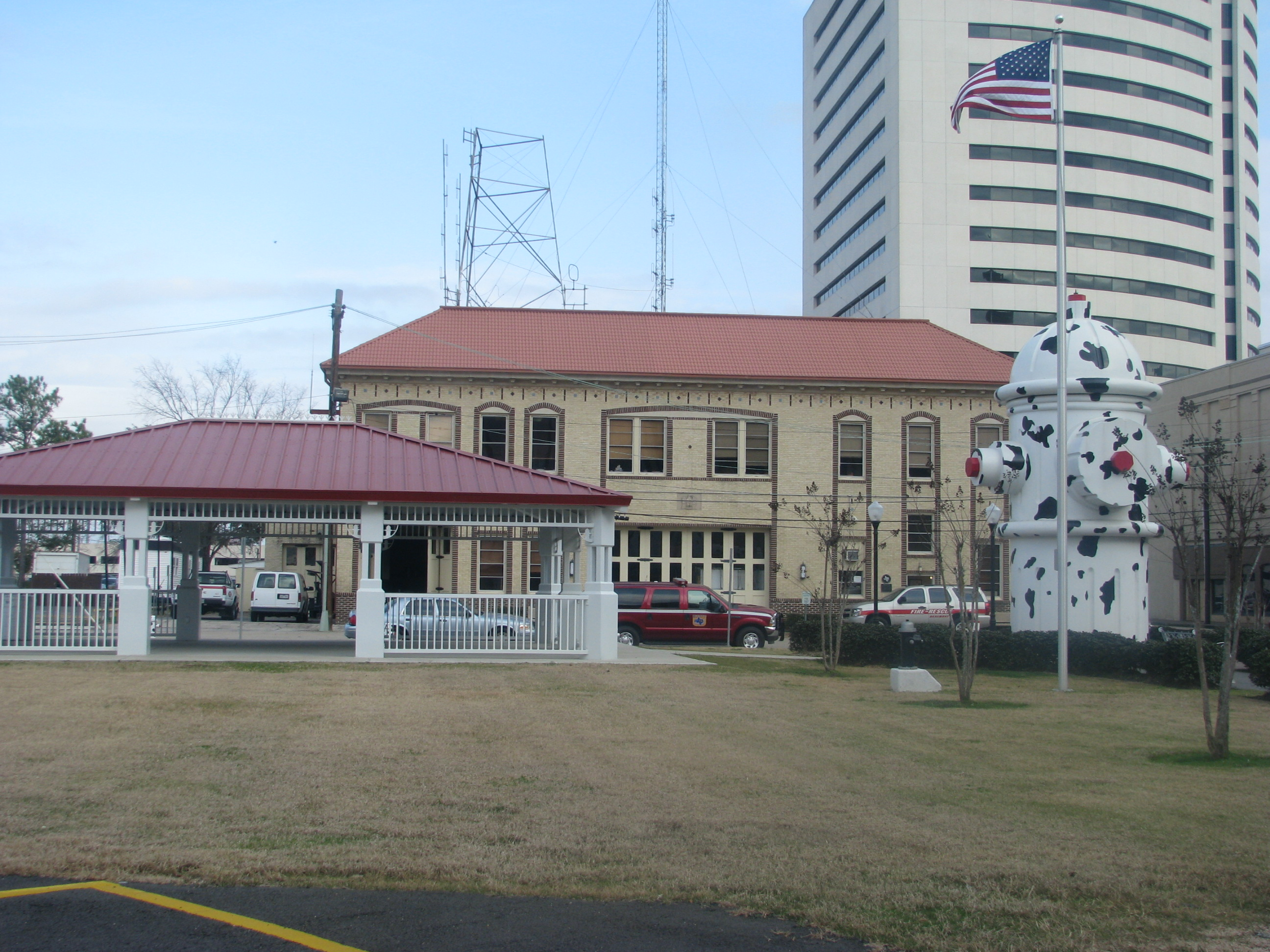
Fire Museum of Texas

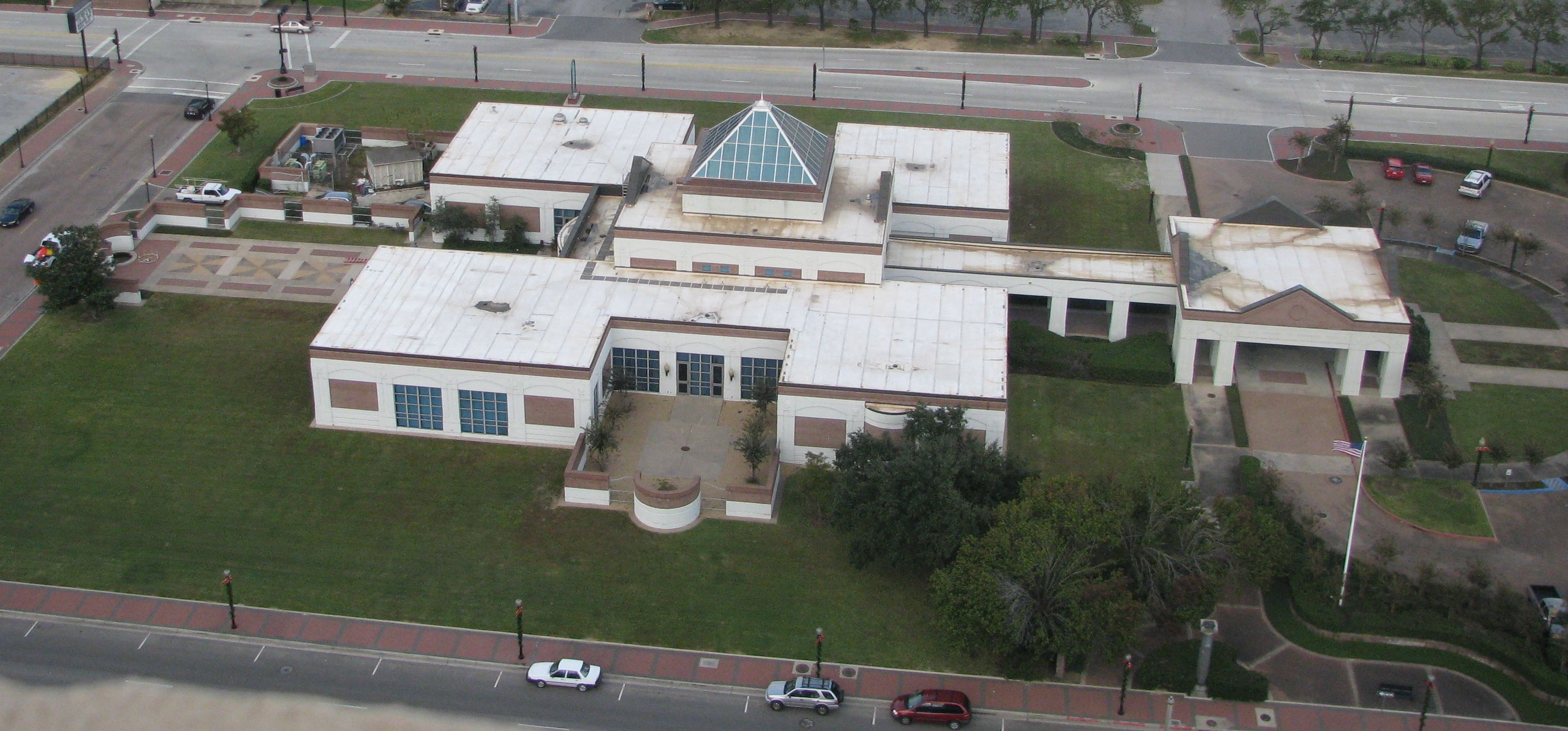
Art Museum of Southeast Texas

=== Libraries ===
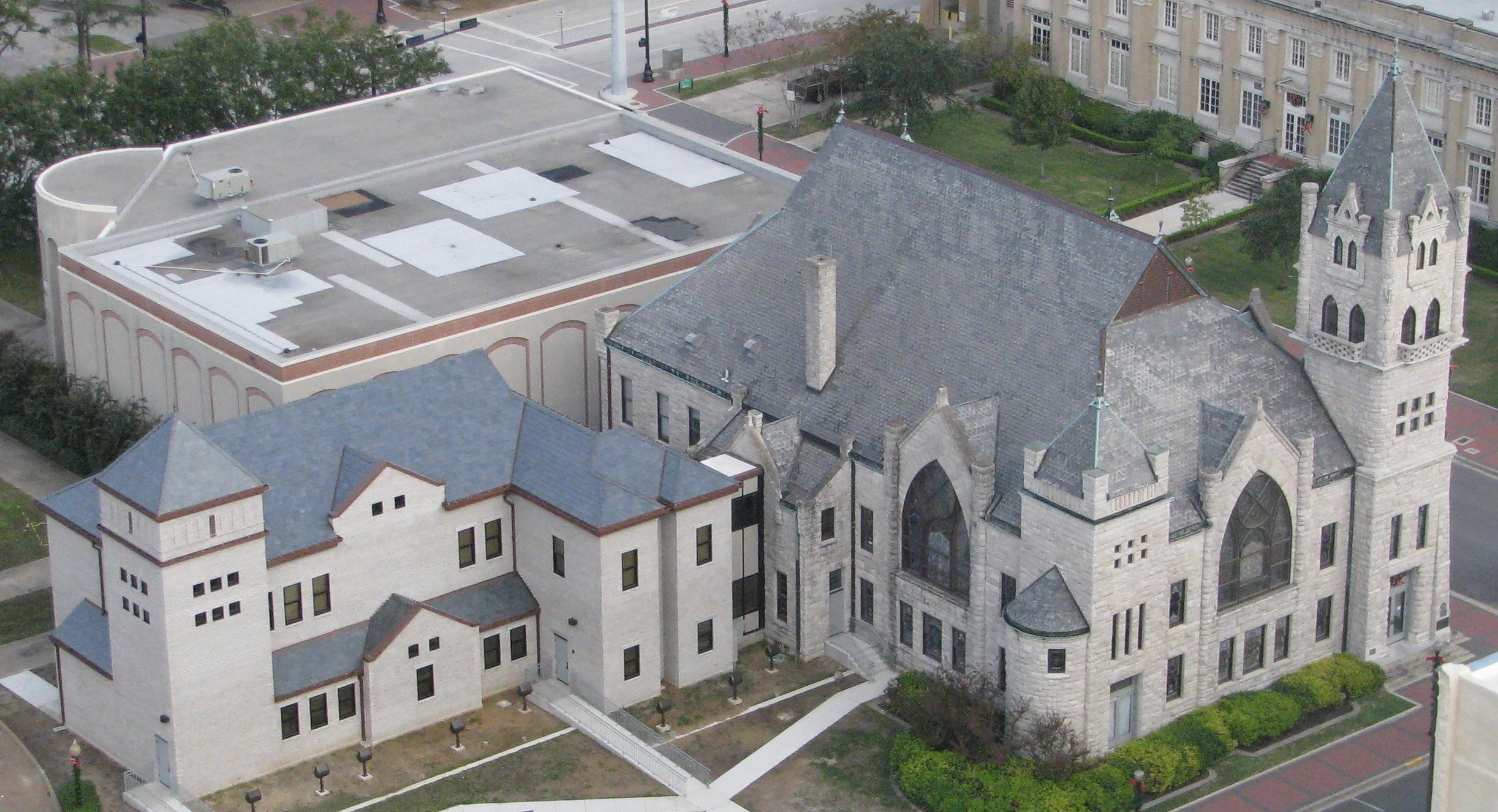
Tyrrell Historical Library

The Beaumont public library system has its headquarters and main branch in downtown Beaumont. The main branch features more than 130,000 titles available for loan, DVDs, Blu-ray, Audiobooks and computer access. The Tyrrell Historical Library, also part of the Beaumont public library system, has archives including material from the Jefferson Beaumont family; the George W. O'Brien diaries from the American Civil War and the O'Brien family papers; and, an autograph album which belonged to Captain Randolph Owen of Alabama which included autographs of Confederate military leaders imprisoned by Union Forces at Johnson's Island, Ohio after the Civil War. The Terrell Historical Library is located in the original First Baptist Church of Beaumont.

=== Theatres ===
Built in 1927 for Jefferson Amusement Company, Jefferson Theatre was built at a cost of $1 million and constructed of the finest materials available at the time. It's A Wonderful Life 1946 premiere was held at the Jefferson Theatre, with star James Stewart and director Frank Capra in attendance.

Julie Rogers Theater was originally constructed as City Hall in 1928. The capacity is approximately 1700 seats. The theatre is home to the Beaumont Civic Ballet, Beaumont Civic Opera, and Symphony of Southeast Texas. The theatre is located across the street from the Beaumont Civic Center.

Theatres
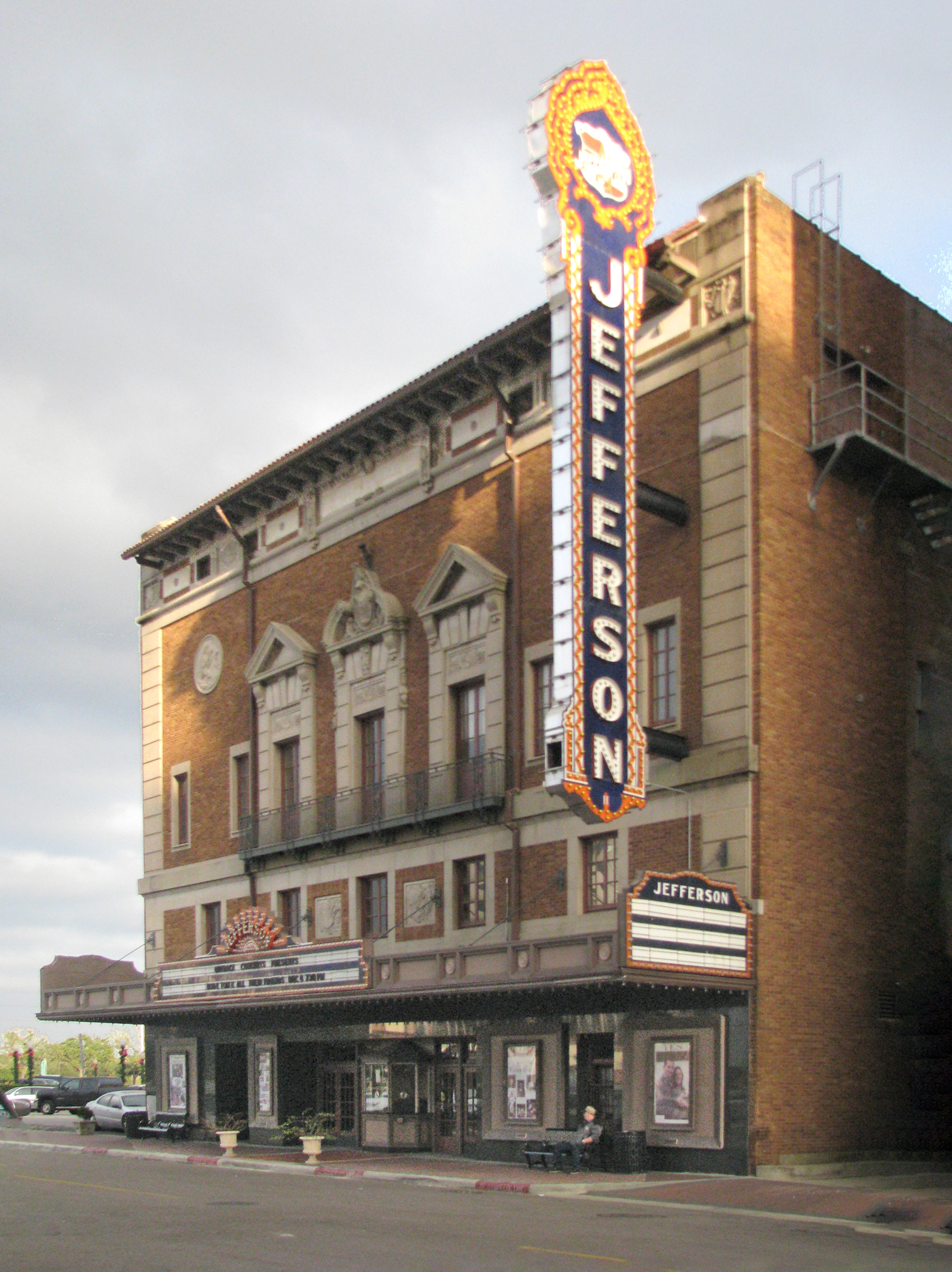
Jefferson Theatre

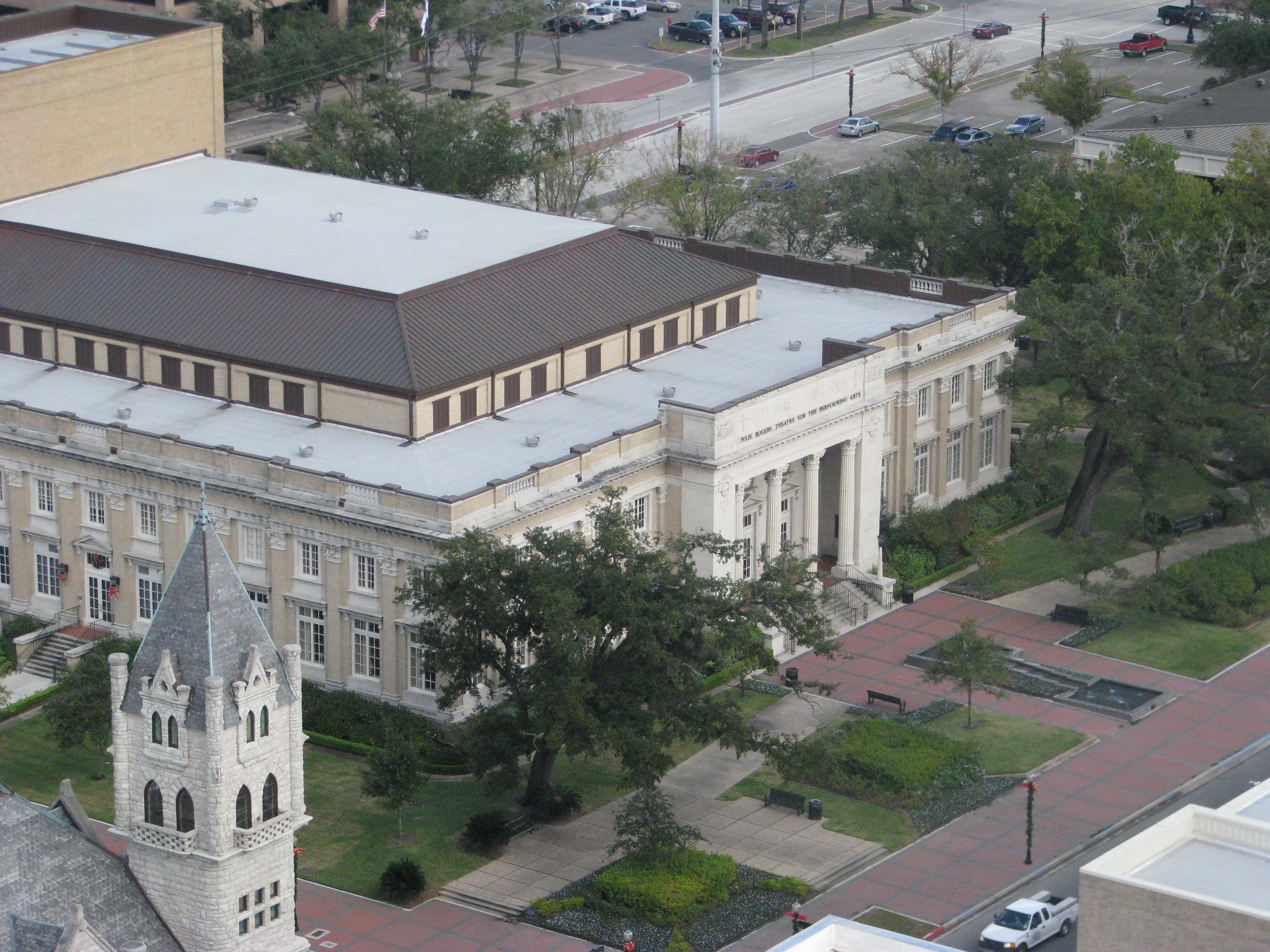
Julie Rogers Theatre

== Entertainment and recreation ==
=== Crockett Street ===
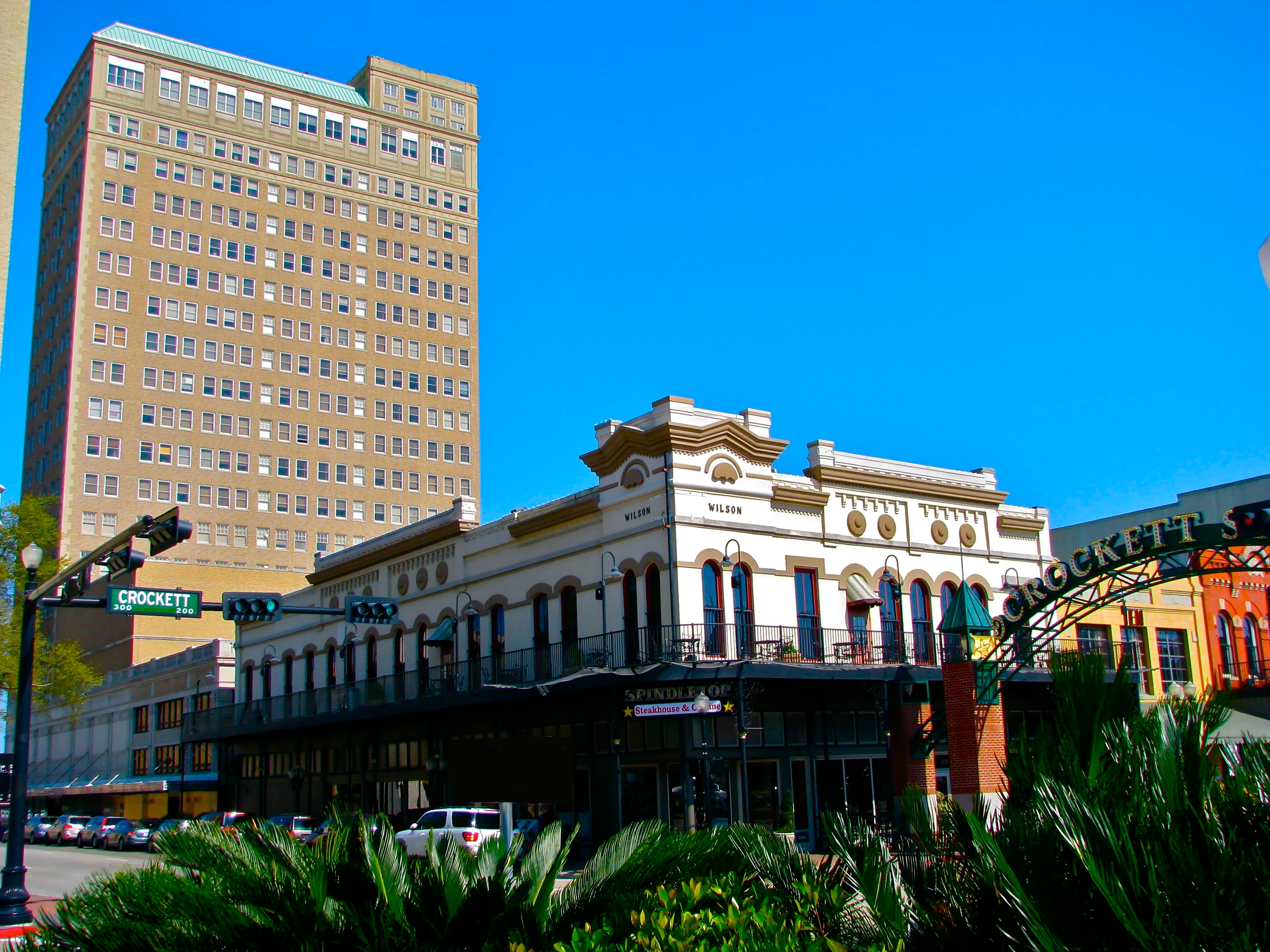
Crockett Street

The Crockett Street entertainment complex offers night clubs and restaurants for the nightlife of downtown Beaumont. Crockett Street once included an entirely different lay out. It was restructured after a lawsuit resulting from an incident involving the death of a local women due to negligence of alcohol consumption. With Beaumont's convenient location off I-10, a major highway connecting Houston to New Orleans, Crockett is able to host both local and national music acts.

=== Events ===
The Gusher Marathon formed in 2010 by the local nonprofit Sports Society for American Health is the city's first annual marathon. The Gusher takes place in march and includes a 5K, half marathon and full marathon. The course begins at the Montagne Center of Lamar University and tours Downtown and Lamar before returning to the Montange. Festivals such as The Beaumont Jazz & Blues Fest have been held in downtown Beaumont since 2005. The Boomtown Film and Music Festival is a film and music festival that began in 2008. The Jefferson Theater and Crockett street venues are used to host events. Beaumont's Winter Parade featuring a lighted boat parade occurs annually in December and begins and ends in downtown. The city's Fourth of July celebration takes place at Riverfront park yearly. Including fire works, concessions, and live music.

== Parks & Facilities ==
The Beaumont Civic Center is on main street, the venue is host to trade shows, sporting events, conventions, banquets, graduations and concerts. The civic center had seating for 6,500.

On a fourteen-acre site, the Beaumont Event Centre and plaza is located between the streets of Neches and MLK Pkwy. Covering twelve acres, the center features a twelve-acre Great Lawn for concerts, a walking path, a multilevel 16,000 sq ft event hall, and a 3,800 sq ft band stand facing the Great Lawn. A 14,000 sq ft canopy overlooks a two and one half acre lake with a thirty-five foot fountain.

Riverfront park is just east of Main street along the Neches River. The park includes an amphitheater with seating for fifty, boat docks, a river overlook, and covered pavilions. The park and surrounding area is the site of the annual July 4 celebration. The park was indefinitely closed due to damages from flooding caused by Tropical Storm Harvey in September 2017

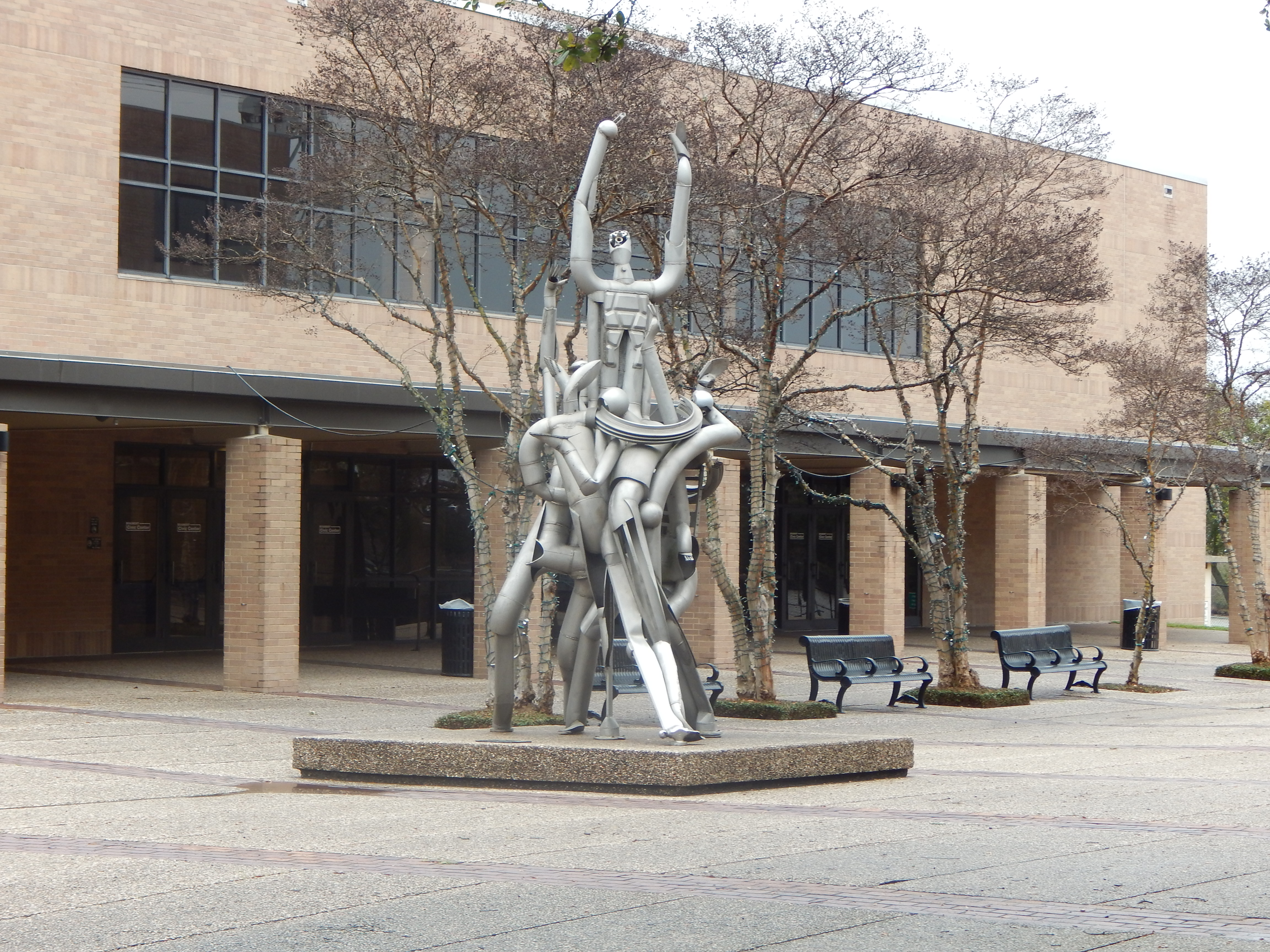
Beaumont Civic Center

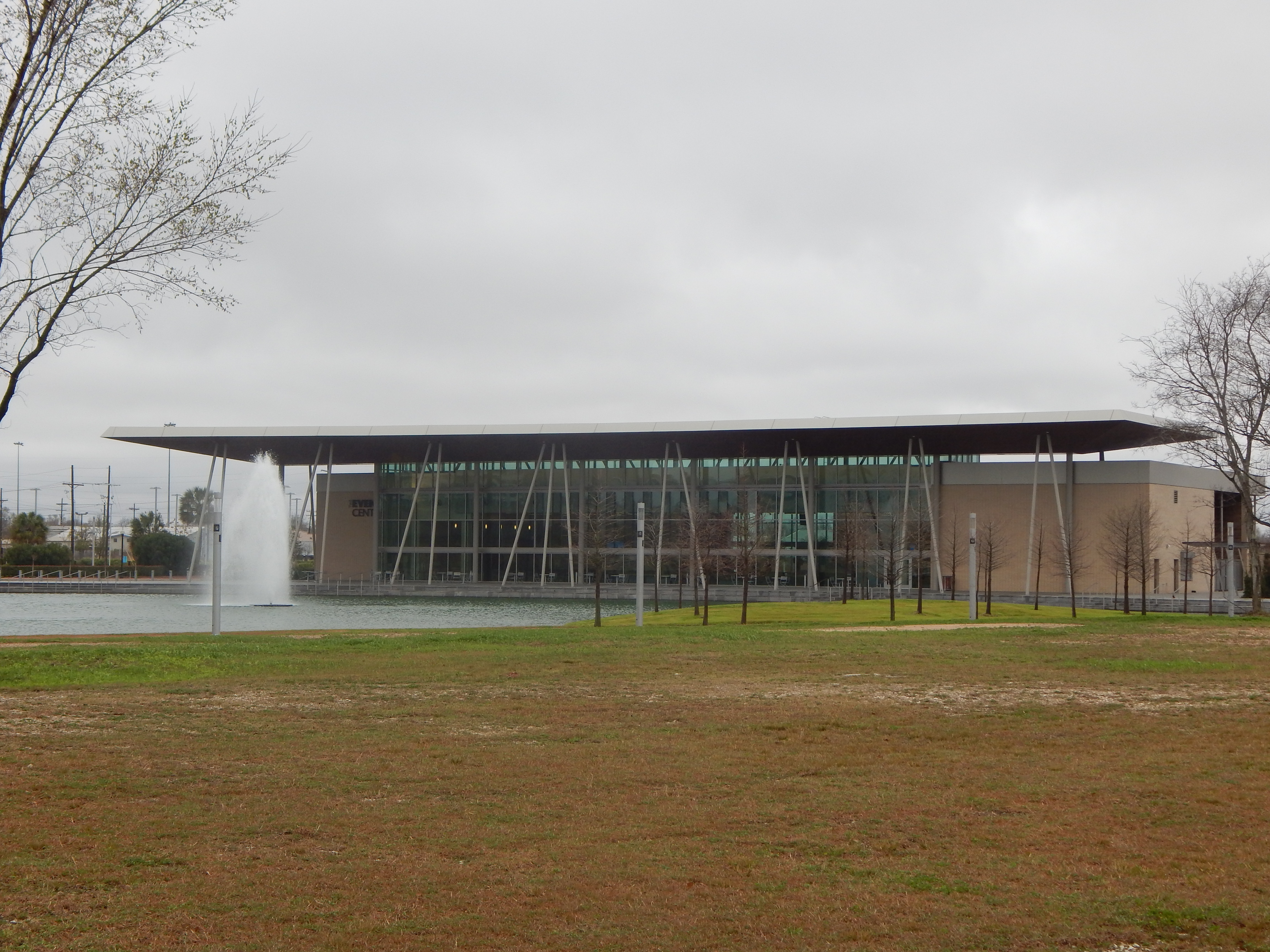
Beaumont Event Center

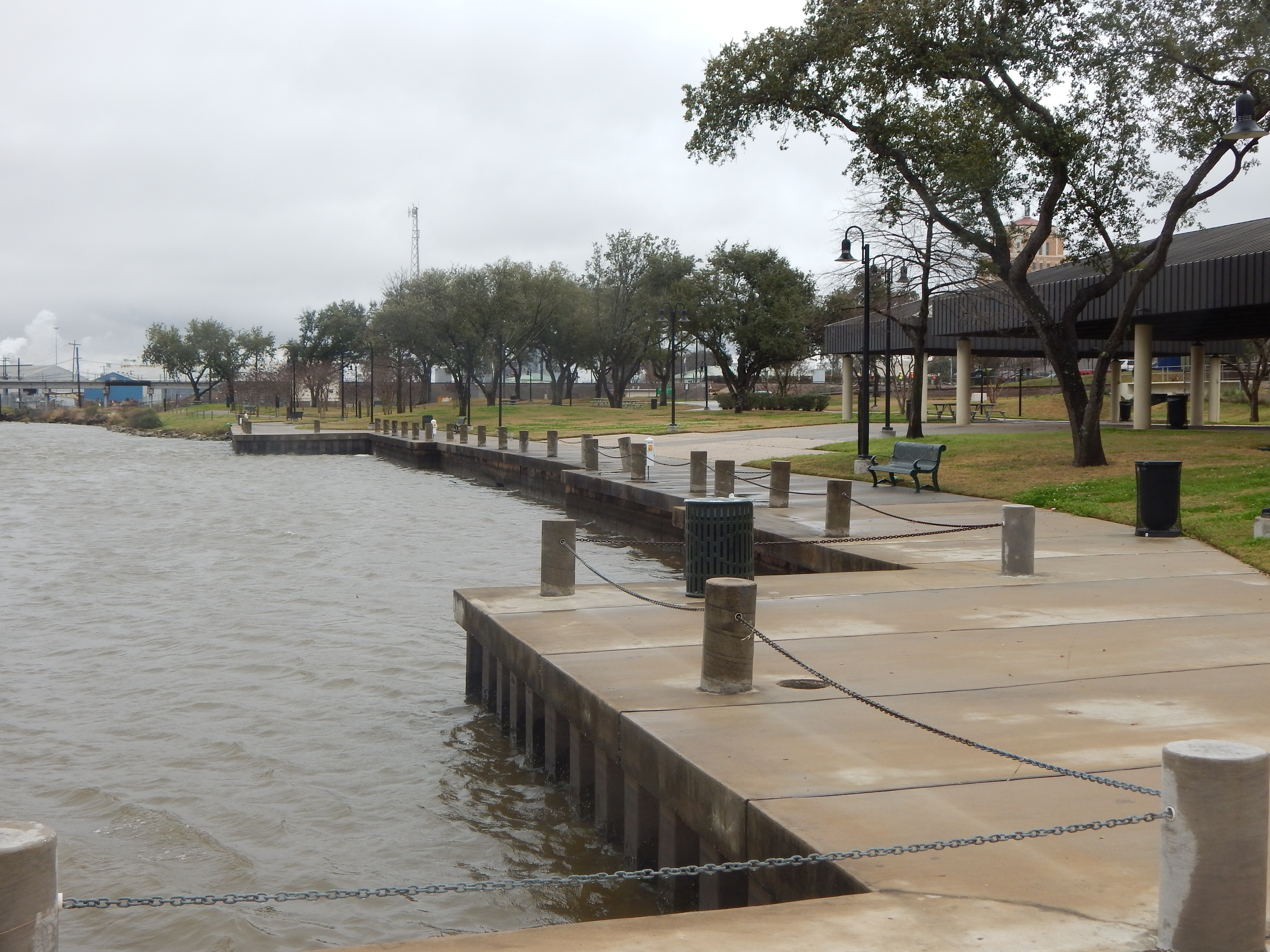
Riverfront Park

== Economy ==
Downtown is home to the headquarters of Entergy Texas, whose offices are housed in Edison Plaza. Salad Soulmates, manufacturer of Leo's Salad Dressing has national distribution through Jason's Deli (also based in Beaumont), maintains its corporate and manufacturing headquarters in downtown. CB&I, Capital One, RDS Engineering, Provost Umphrey law firm and many other smaller firms have offices in downtown.

Downtown is mainly host to government offices, law firms, engineering firms and banks.

== Government ==
Government buildings
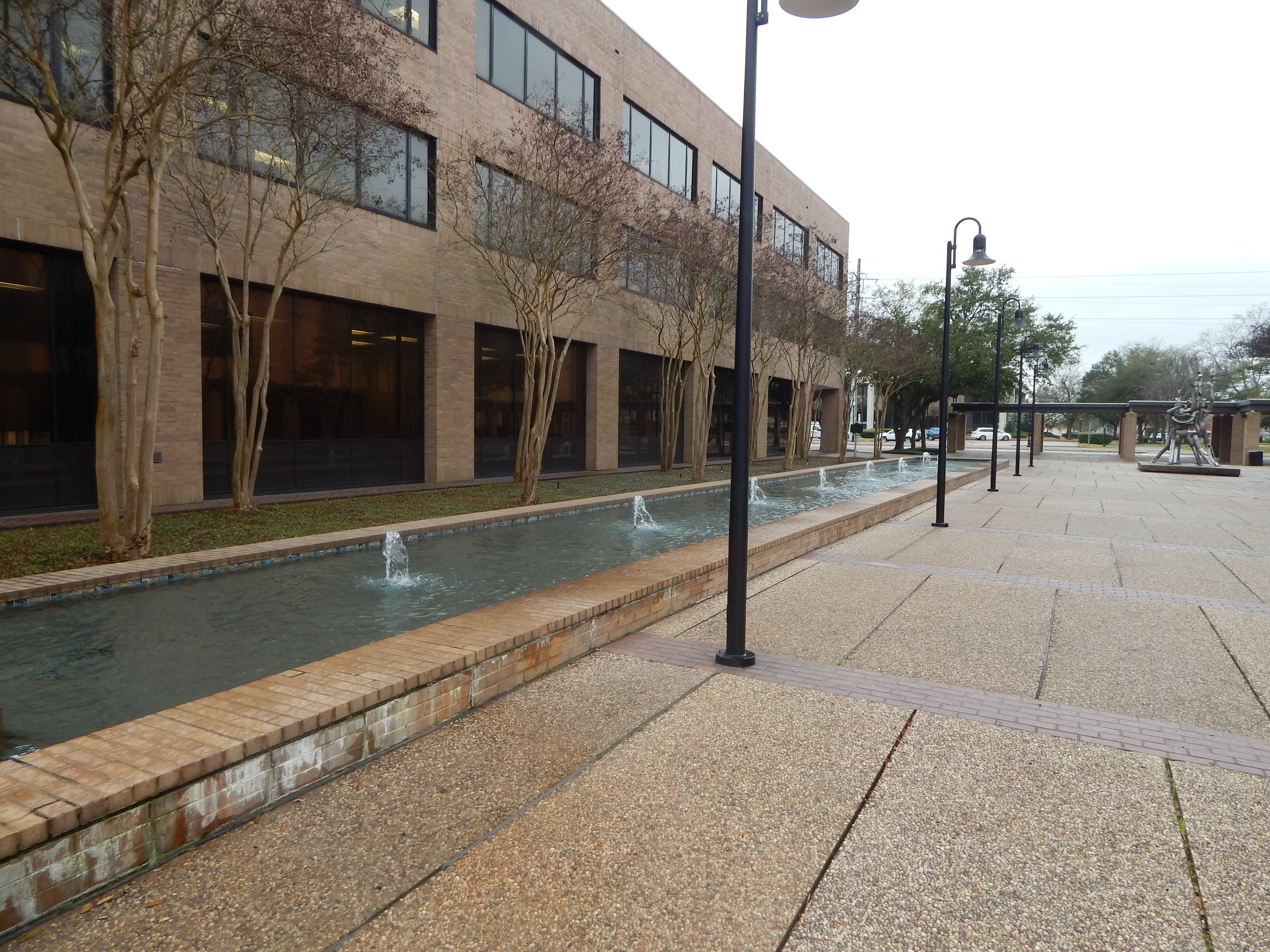
Beaumont City Hall

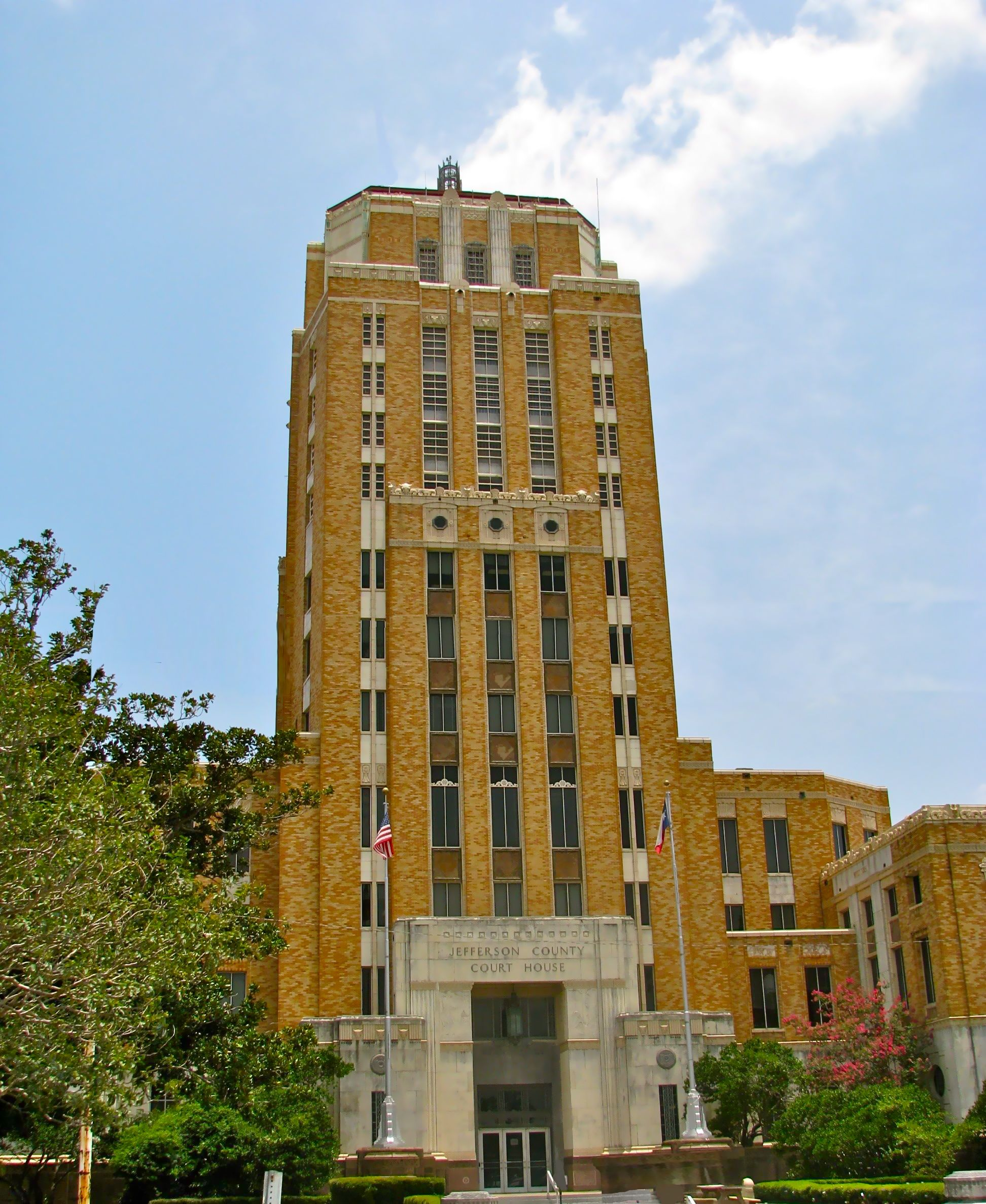
Jefferson County Courthouse

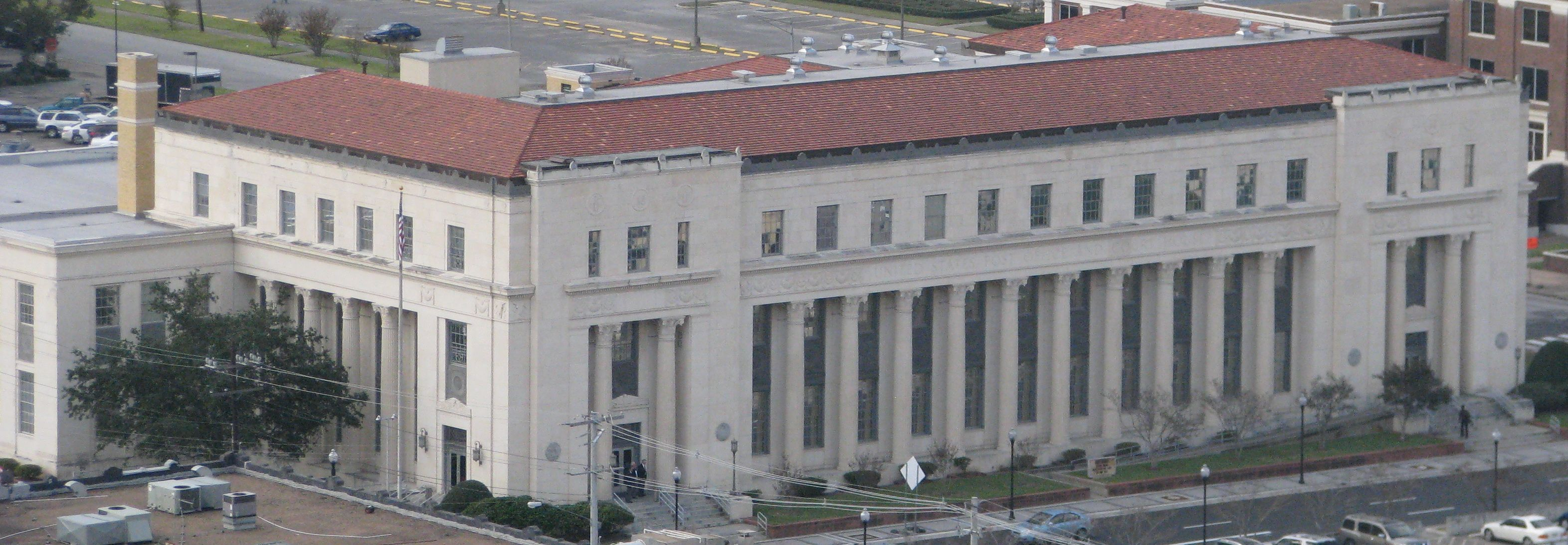
Jack Brooks Federal Building

=== City ===
Beaumont City hall is located on Main Street in downtown.

=== County ===
Jefferson County Court house is located in downtown and is a notable Art Deco building.

=== Federal ===
The United States District Court for the Eastern District of Texas is located in the Jack Brooks Federal Building. The federal building is also home to a branch of the United States Postal Service.
