= Beaumont Children's Museum =

Museum in Beaumont, Texas

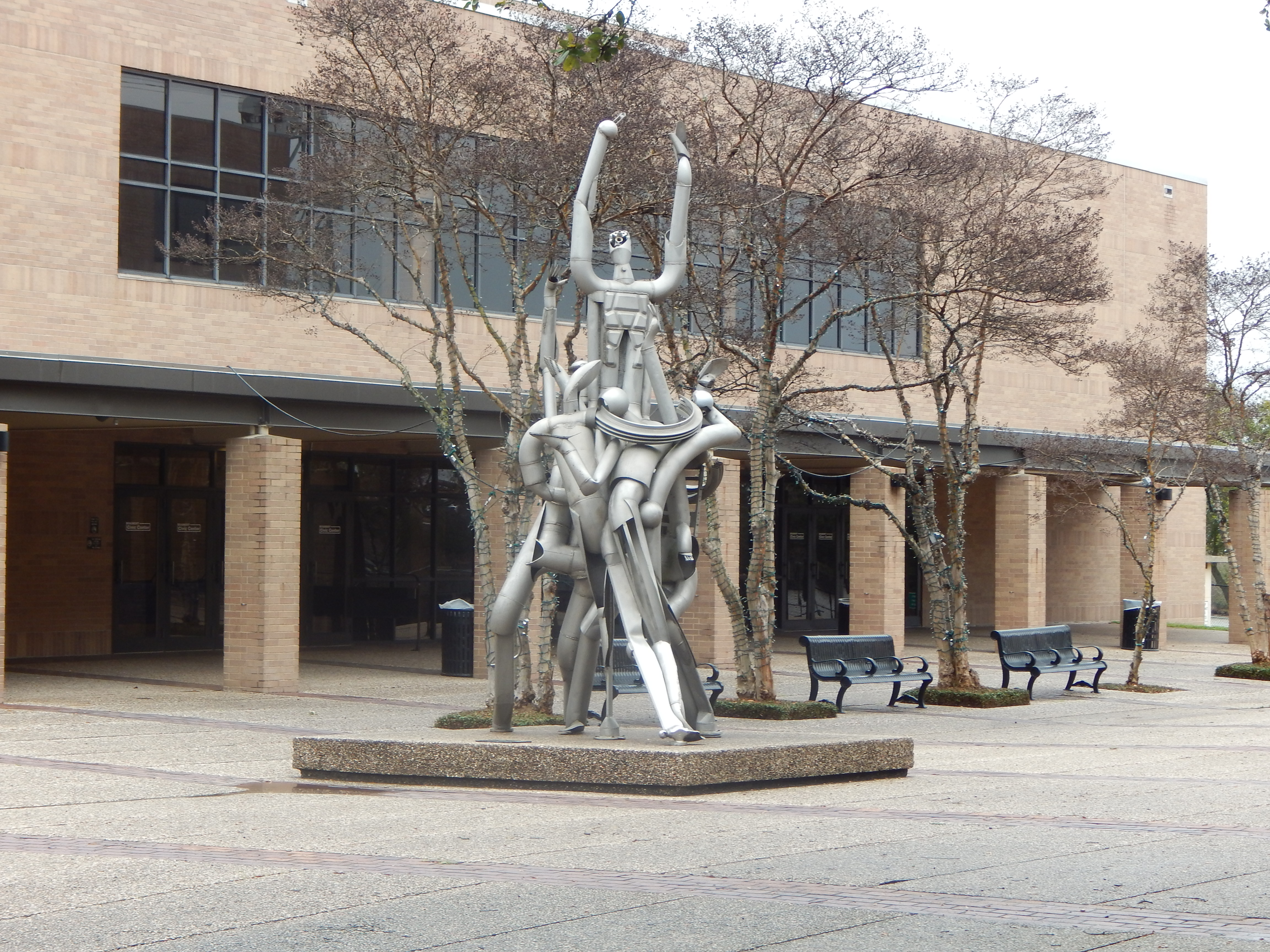
- Museum's temporary home in the Beaumont Civic Center

- Beaumont Children's Museum location in Texas
- Established: 2008
- Location: 701 Main Street, Beaumont, Texas 77701
- Coordinates: 30°4′57″N 94°5′42″W
- Type: Children's
- Public transit access: BMTS
- Parking: Adjacent to museum
- Website: www.beaumontchildrensmuseum.org

The Beaumont Children's Museum is a children's museum temporarily located in the Beaumont Civic Center in Beaumont, Texas.

The museum is part of a concentration of several museums in the downtown Beaumont area. It is located across the street from the Tyrrell Historical Library, Art Museum of Southeast Texas and the Texas Energy Museum. The Edison Museum and Fire Museum of Texas are within a few blocks.

== History ==
The museum started in 2008 as a 501(c)(3) nonprofit organization. The museum opened for exhibits in 2010 as a "museum without walls". In 2012, a lease was acquired for a site at the corner of Neches and Crockett streets in downtown Beaumont. The building was later condemned and removed. Following condemnation and subsequent removal of the building, the museum continued operations as a "museum without walls". It moved to its current temporary home, the Beaumont Civic Center in 2014 opening for exhibits in the summer of 2015. The main entrance to the museum is located on the north side of the civic center.

== Features ==
=== Permanent exhibits ===
Permanent exhibits include:

- STUFFEE, a seven-foot ambassador of health.
- Lego Stations designed to teach children STEM skills
  - Simple and mechanized machines
  - Stability Station
  - Drop Build
  - Sky Spot
- Toddler Spot
- Our Town Exhibit
  - Grocery Store
  - Bank
  - Medical Clinic

=== Activities ===
In addition to exhibits, the museum sponsors several activities throughout the year as well as summer camps. For example, 2015 events include:

- Dia de los Muertos - Trick or treat coupled with art and culture
- Halloween Week
- Camps throughout the summer offering field trips as well as activities at the museum
- Touch a Truck - offering children an opportunity to touch and explore their favorite truck
