= Edison Museum =

Museum in Beaumont, Texas, United States

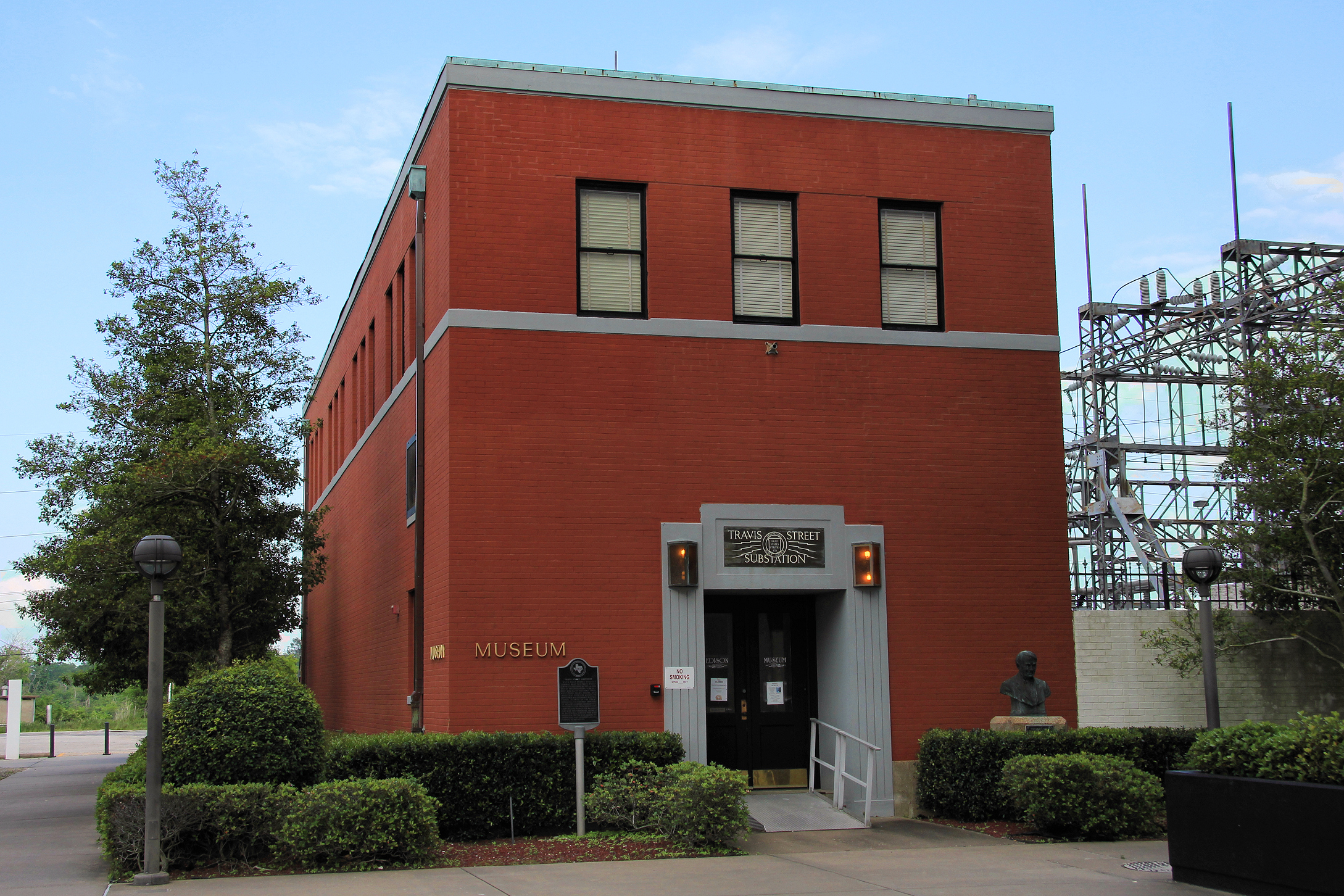
- Edison Museum

- Edison Museum's location in Texas Edison Museum (the United States)
- Established: 1982
- Location: 350 Pine Street, Beaumont, Texas 77701
- Coordinates: 30°05′08.3″N 94°05′48″W
- Type: Science, Technology, and History
- Collection size: over 1,400 artifacts dedicated to Thomas Alva Edison
- Owners: Edison Museum, a non-profit education foundation
- Public transit access: BMTS; Route #6 (Refinery); Route #7 (South Park); Route #8 (Pear Orchard)
- Parking: Free, adjacent to museum
- Website: Museum website

The Edison Museum, a science and history museum about the life and inventions of Thomas Edison, is located in Beaumont, Texas, United States at 350 Pine St. on the grounds of Edison Plaza.

== Building ==
The museum building was formerly the Gulf States Utilities Travis Street Power Substation. The power substation came on line in 1929. According to the Texas State Historical Marker in front of the substation building, the substation provided power ranging from street lights to cotton gins to rice irrigation to refineries in spite of The Great Depression.

== Museum ==
"...The museum is the only facility of its kind west of the Mississippi River..." Interactive exhibits about Edison, his inventions and innovations, as well as historic artifacts from his life are featured. Featured inventions include the incandescent light bulb, the phonograph, and some of Edison's early motion pictures. There is also a reference library about Edison. The collection origin is tied to W. Donham Crawford, former CEO of Gulf States Utilities. Crawford was an avid collector of Edison artifacts. The collection was bequeathed to the museum in the early 1980s by Crawford's widow.

The museum is part of a concentration of several museums in the downtown Beaumont area. It is located blocks away from the Tyrrell Historical Library, the Art Museum of Southeast Texas, the Beaumont Children's Museum (temporarily located in the Beaumont Civic Center), and the Fire Museum of Texas.

== See also ==
- Edison and Ford Winter Estates, museum in Fort Myers, Florida
- Thomas Alva Edison Memorial Tower and Museum in Edison, New Jersey
- Thomas Edison Depot Museum in Port Huron, Michigan
- Edison National Historic Site in West Orange, New Jersey
