= Fire Museum of Texas =

Museum in Texas

Fire Museum of Beaumont
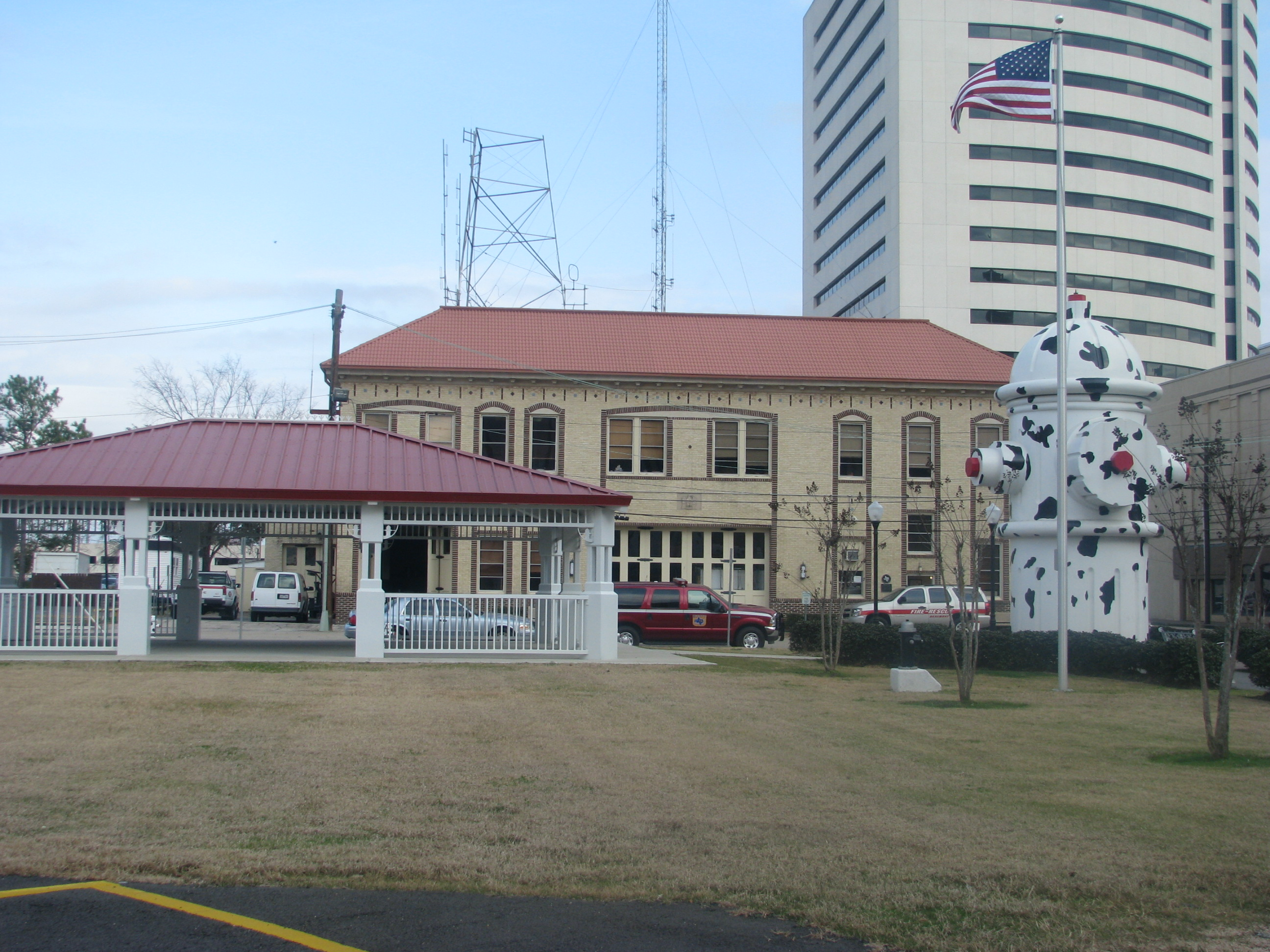
- Location: 400 Walnut St, Beaumont, Texas
- Coordinates: 30.0860°N 94.0985°W
- Built: 1927
- Architectural style(s): Renaissance Revival

The Fire Museum of Texas is located in the former Central Fire Station, in Beaumont, Texas. The building was constructed in 1927 and is a Recorded Texas Historic Landmark. The museum houses interactive fire safety exhibits with a collection of antique fire equipment dating back to 1856. The museum also has a two-story playhouse, designed to help children learn fire safety. Featured prominently in front of the museum building is "the world's largest working fire hydrant", which measures 24 feet tall. The museum also features the State of Texas Firefighter Memorial, a 9-11 memorial, and a firefighter commemorative walkway.

Permanent exhibits trace the history of firefighting from bucket brigades to present practices. Several antique trucks are featured dating from 1856. Temporary exhibits can also be found at the museum.

The museum is part of a concentration of several museums in the downtown Beaumont area. It is located blocks away from the Tyrrell Historical Library, the Art Museum of Southeast Texas, the Beaumont Children's Museum (temporarily located in the Beaumont Civic Center), and the Edison Museum.
