= Spindletop-Gladys City Boomtown Museum =

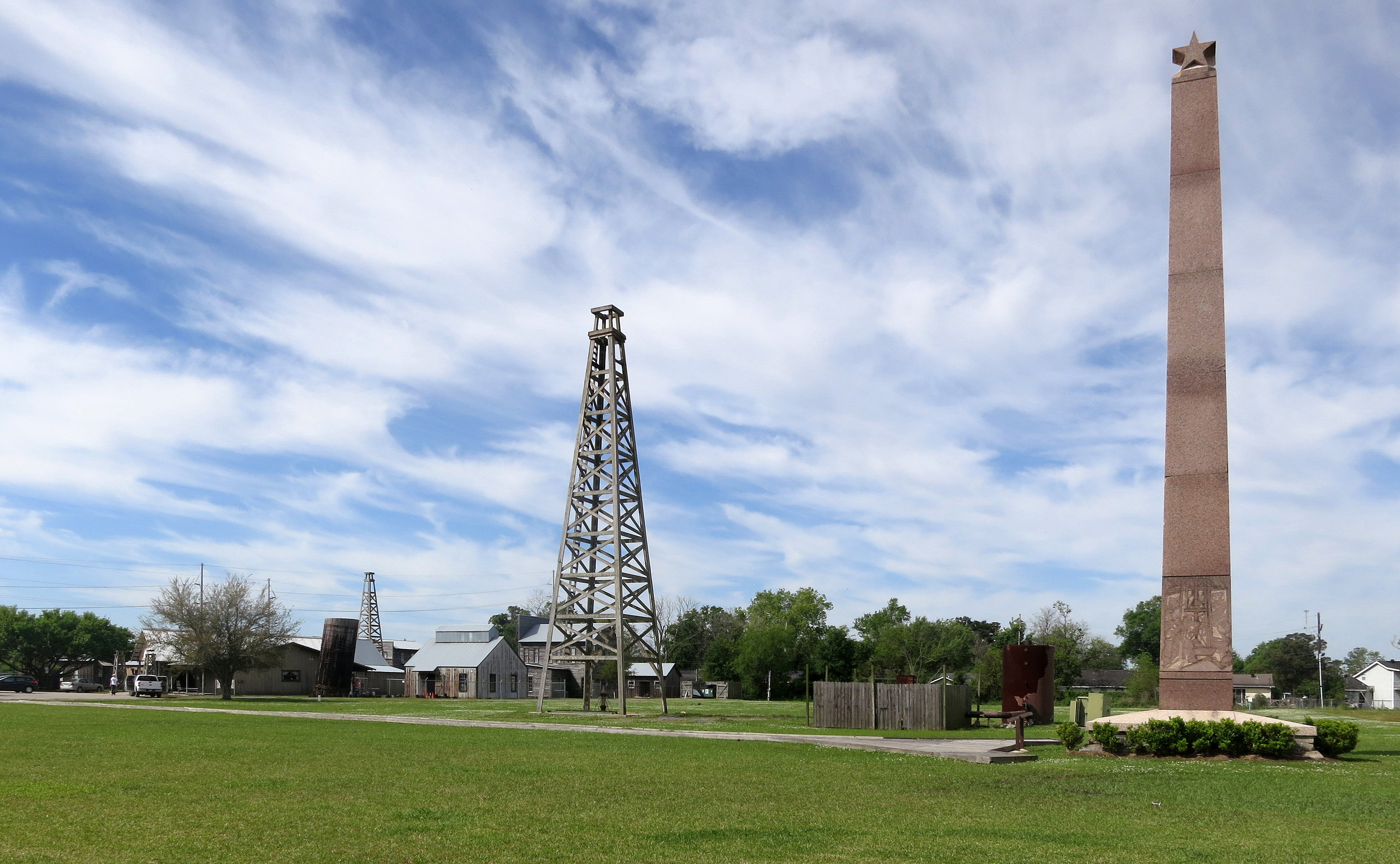

- Spindletop-Gladys City Boomtown Museum Spindletop-Gladys City Boomtown Museum (the United States)
- Location: 5550 Jimmy Simmons Drive, Beaumont, TX 77705
- Coordinates: 30°01′57.5″N 94°04′44.9″W
- Type: History Museum
- Director: Troy Gray
- Owner: Lamar University
- Public transit access: (BMT) Route 7 -Virginia and Rolfe Christopher
- Parking: Free parking at site
- Website: spindletop.org

The Spindletop-Gladys City Boomtown Museum is located in Beaumont, Texas, to commemorate the discovery of oil at the Spindletop Hill salt dome in Beaumont on Jan. 10, 1901. The discovery sparked an oil boom in Texas that continues today. Along with a gift shop with commemorative gifts, the museum features historical, period reenactments by area performers. A replica of the wooden oil derricks that once dotted the landscape of Spindletop Hill in the early 1900s has been erected near the museum. For special occasions and anniversaries, the museum staff “blows the gusher” with a plume of water and provides a historical narrative and sound effects to simulate the discovery of oil at Spindletop.

The museum is on the campus of Lamar University, which owns and operates the museum.

== Spindletop oil boom ==
The name “Spindletop” dates from before the Civil War when a slight rise of the ground just south of Beaumont, Texas, became known as Spindletop Hill. One theory about the origin of its name is that the heat waves, rising from the surrounding prairie, gave a grove of trees on the hill the appearance of a spinning top. Many ghost stories were associated with Spindletop Hill. St. Elmo's fire, actually static electricity, was often seen dancing there in the moonlight. The Spindletop salt dome was derived from the Louann Salt evaporite layer of Jurassic age.

In 1889, Pattillo Higgins, a young Beaumont man, became interested in the possibility that Spindletop Hill covered a vast pool of oil. Higgins was a self-taught geologist and from his extensive studies and observation of surface indications, he concluded that an abundance of cheap fuel was available at Spindletop.

Capt. George Washington O’Brien had known of the possibility of producing oil from Spindletop Hill as early as 1865 and had acquired more than 1,000 acres of the John Allen Veatch survey in 1888. Higgins interested his friend George W. Carroll in purchasing the other major portion of the Veatch survey. In 1892, the men decided to pool their interests and formed the Gladys City Oil, Gas and Manufacturing Company. It was one of the earliest oil companies incorporated in Texas. Their plan was to find oil and use it to develop a model industrial city called Gladys City. Higgins named the town and the company for his Sunday school pupil, Gladys Bingham.

The Gladys City Company was the first oil company to drill on Spindletop Hill in 1893 with no success. They tried again in 1895 and in 1896, failing each time because of the lack of adequate equipment. Higgins left the company in 1895. Although Higgins had promised to make his partners wealthy, they began to lose faith in the whole project. Higgins became known jokingly as the “Millionaire.”

An Austrian-born mining engineer, Capt. Anthony F. Lucas had heard of Spindletop Hill while developing salt mines in Louisiana. After traveling to Beaumont, he became convinced there was oil at Spindletop and leased land from the Gladys City Company in 1899. When his first attempt failed, Lucas was ready to quit until his wife urged him to seek outside financing and try again. Lucas went to the famous Pittsburgh wildcatting team of James Guffey and John Galey. They were interested in Lucas’ prospects and approached Andrew Mellon for money to continue operations.

Guffey and Galey hired the Hamill brothers of Corsicana, Texas, the best rotary drillers available. Al and Curt Hamill arrived in Beaumont and began drilling on the adjoining McFaddin-Weiss & Kyle tract of land in October 1900. In spite of tremendous difficulties they reached 1,000 feet by Christmas. After returning from the holidays, they encountered new problems. Upon reaching solid rock, their drill lodged in a crevice at 1,060 feet. At approximately 10:30 a.m. on January 10, 1901, while the Hamill brothers were attempting to free their drill from the crevice, the famous Lucas Gusher blew in. Oil sprayed more than 100 feet above the derrick for nine days until the well was capped.

It was the greatest oil well ever seen. Although Lucas estimated its flow at 6,000 barrels per day, it was actually flowing 80,000 – 100,000 barrels per day. No longer was Patillo Higgins laughingly called the “Millionaire.” Practically overnight, thousands of sightseers, speculators, promoters, fortune seekers and “boomers” poured into Beaumont as news of the discovery spread. Gladys City was only one of the several concentrations of buildings that sprang up on Spindletop Hill. Businesses and residences were also located in the “Spindle Top,” Hogg-Swayne, Keith-Ward and Yellow Pine districts.

By 1902, 285 active wells were operating on Spindletop Hill. More than 600 oil companies had been chartered. Although most vanished overnight, some such as Texas Company (Texaco), J.M. Guffey Petroleum Company (Gulf), Magnolia Petroleum Company (Mobil) and Sun Oil Company went on to become giants of the industry.

The boom at Spindletop was short lived. Overproduction depleted the oil and ruined many wells. By 1903, the field had begun to decline and within 10 years Spindletop Hill was virtually a ghost town. In 1926, Spindletop boomed again when new technology led to the discovery of oil on the flanks of the salt dome through deeper drilling. Better conservation methods prolonged Spindletop's second life and the little Gladys City community remained active until the site was cleared during sulfur mining activities in the 1950s. The Gladys City Oil Company still exists and continues its involvement at Spindletop today. The Lucas Gusher marked the beginning of a new age for the world – the Petroleum Age. Although Pennsylvania was the location of the first commercial oil well and Russia could claim the first gushers, the vast quantities of oil discovered at Spindletop first made possible the use of oil as an inexpensive, lightweight and efficient fuel to propel the world into the 20th Century.

== History of the Museum ==
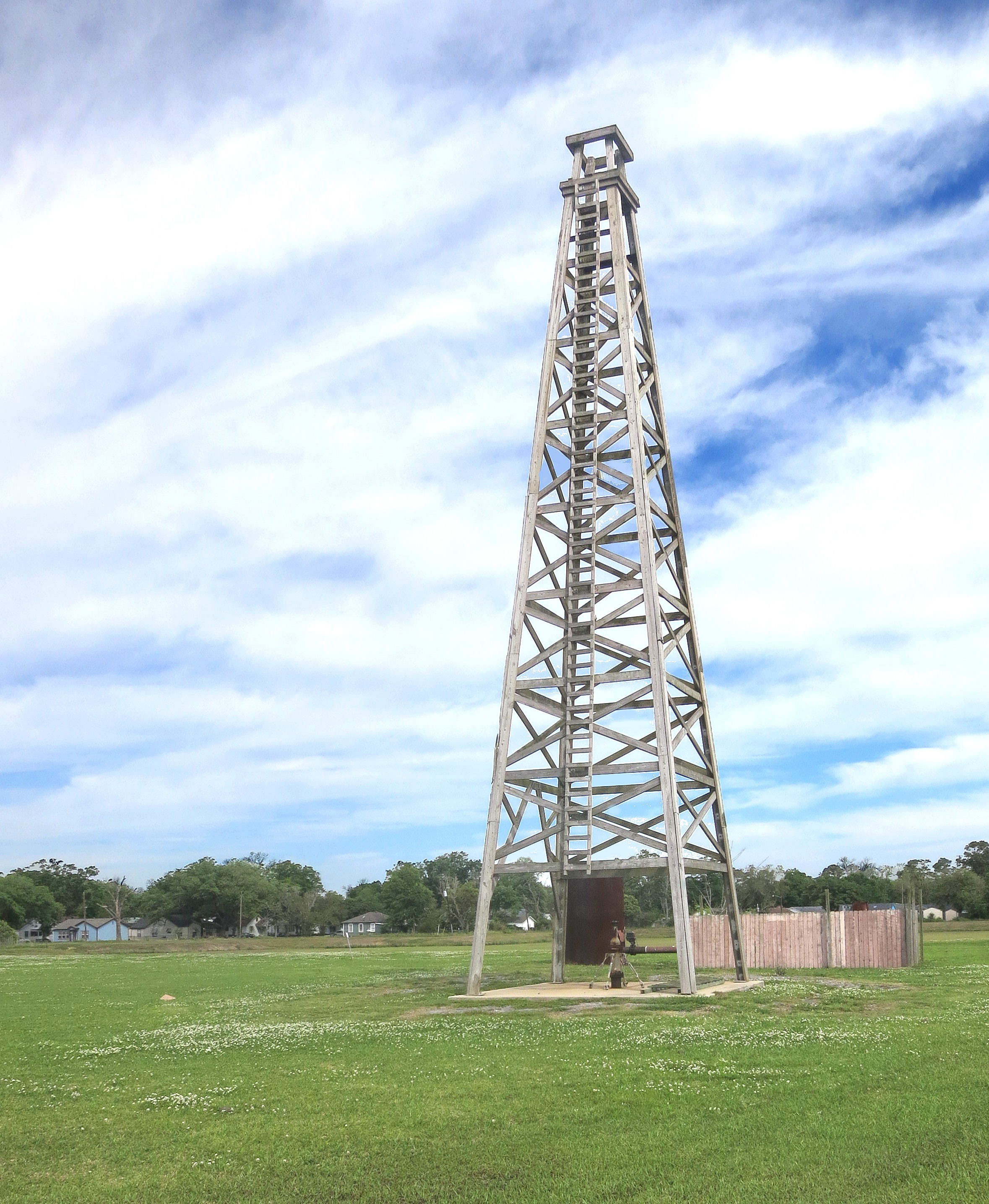
Replica of the Lucas Spindletop Gusher at the museum

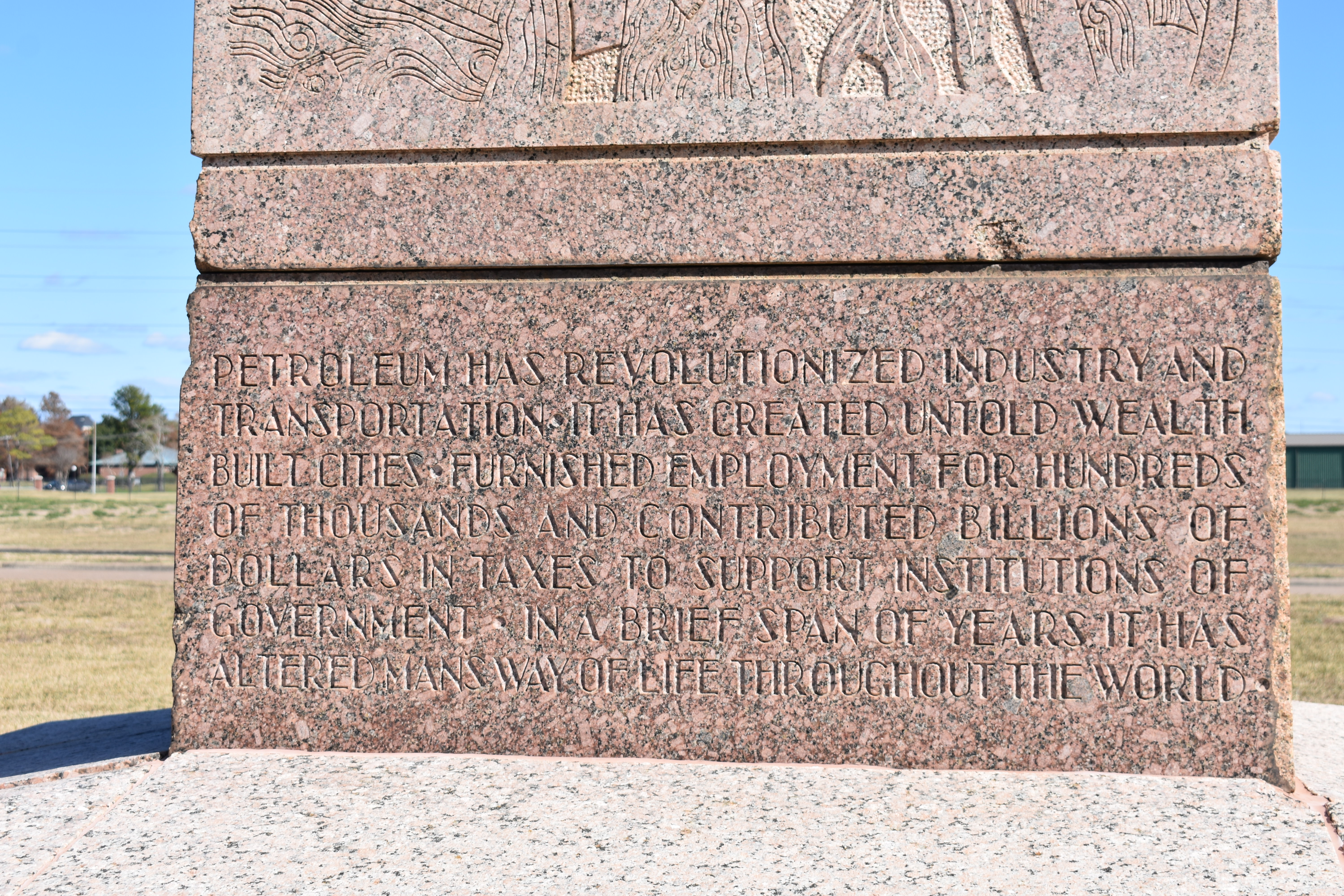
Close up of text on the Lucas Gusher Monument

The reconstruction of Gladys City was a Bicentennial project of the Lucas Gusher Monument Commission. Lamar University dedicated the Spindletop-Gladys City Boomtown Museum on January 10, 1976, the 75th anniversary of the Lucas Gusher. Gladys City was given to the State of Texas and Lamar University for continued care and development as an educational resource. The buildings in Gladys City are all patterned after buildings that were at Spindletop in the early 1900s oil boom. Many of the artifacts used to furnish the exhibits are from the time of the boom.

Commemorating the discovery of oil at Spindletop Hill and dedicated January 10, 1951, the Lucas Gusher Monument is a 58-foot pink Texas granite obelisk erected by the Lucas Gusher Monument Association. The monument was originally placed at the site of the Lucas Gusher, approximately three-fourths of a mile south of the Spindletop-Gladys City Boomtown Museum. It was moved to the Gladys City site in 1978 due to soil subsidence and accessibility. The monument and the entire Spindletop field have been designated a National Historic Landmark by the federal government.

On January 10, 2001, former president George H.W. Bush and approximately 20,000 attendees from around the nation participated in the centennial celebration of the Lucas Gusher at the museum. Country music artist Tracy Byrd, a Beaumont resident, wrote and performed an original song about the history of Spindletop for the event. Lamar University reopened the museum after it received extensive damage from Hurricane Rita in 2005.

== See also ==
- List of petroleum museums
- Texas Energy Museum Beaumont, Texas
- McFaddin-Ward House History
- McFaddin-Ward House
