= Gusher Marathon =

Annual spring marathon held in Beaumont, Texas, United States

- Location: Beaumont, Texas
- Primary sponsor: Exygon Gym; Baptist Hospitals
- Established: 2010

The Gusher Marathon is an annual spring marathon held in Beaumont, Texas. It was founded in 2010 by the local nonprofit organization Sports Society for American Health and sponsored by Exygon Gym and Baptist Hospitals. The Gusher in Gusher Marathon refers to the 1901 discovery of oil at the spindletop salt dome in Beaumont. The course is a flat, fast USATF Sanctioned and Certified, Boston Qualifier. The course begins at the Montagne Center of Lamar University and tours much of Downtown Beaumont before returning to Lamar University. The Gusher also offers 5K and half marathon distances in addition to the full marathon. The 2011 marathon was moved to mid March to take advantage of cooler weather.
