= Edison Plaza =

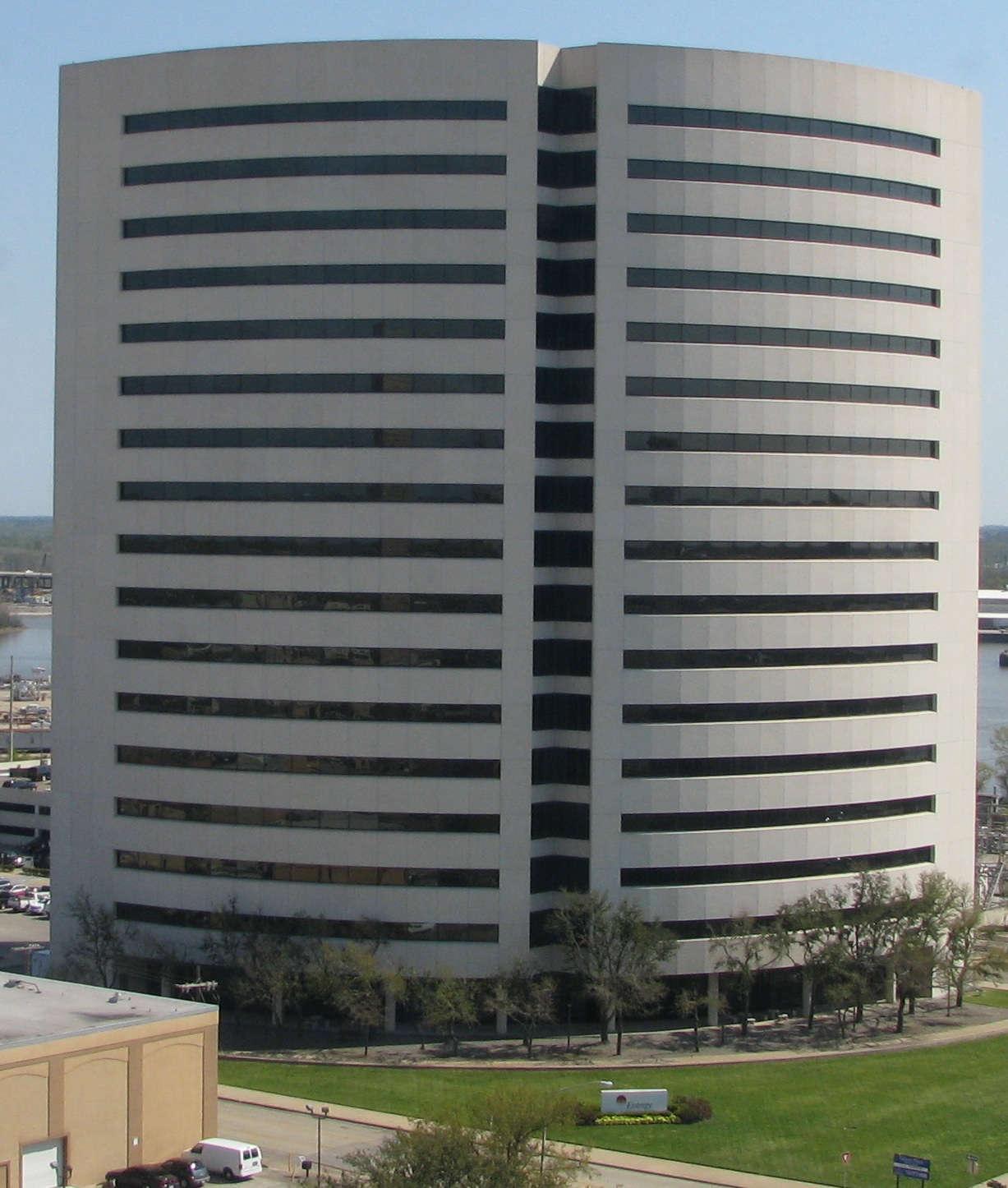
- Interactive map of the Edison Plaza area

General information
- Status: Completed
- Type: Office
- Location: 350 Pine St. Beaumont, Texas
- Coordinates: 30.0855°N 94.0972°W
- Completed: 1982
- Owner: Albanese Cormier Holdings

Height
- Roof: 254 ft (77 m)

Technical details
- Floor count: 17
- Floor area: 425,198 sq ft (39,502.2 m^{2})
- Lifts/elevators: 10

The Edison Plaza is a 17-story office building in downtown Beaumont, Texas, located at 350 Pine St. The building is downtown's newest and tallest skyscraper. Originally built by Gulf States Utilities as its headquarters in 1982, it serves as the Texas headquarters for its successor, Entergy, Texas; however, Entergy no longer owns the building and leases four floors only out of the 17 in the building. It is erroneously called "The Entergy Building" but its correct name is still Edison Plaza. On the grounds of the Edison Plaza is the Edison Museum. As of November 2015, Capital One acquired signage rights to the building.
