= Texana =

Texana denotes both the history and culture of Texas. It may also refer to:

- Texana, North Carolina, an unincorporated community
- Texana, Texas, a ghost town in Jackson County
- Lake Texana, in Jackson County, Texas
  - Lake Texana State Park, located on the above lake
