= Jack Brooks Federal Building =

- U.S. Post Office and Federal Building
- U.S. Historic district – Contributing property
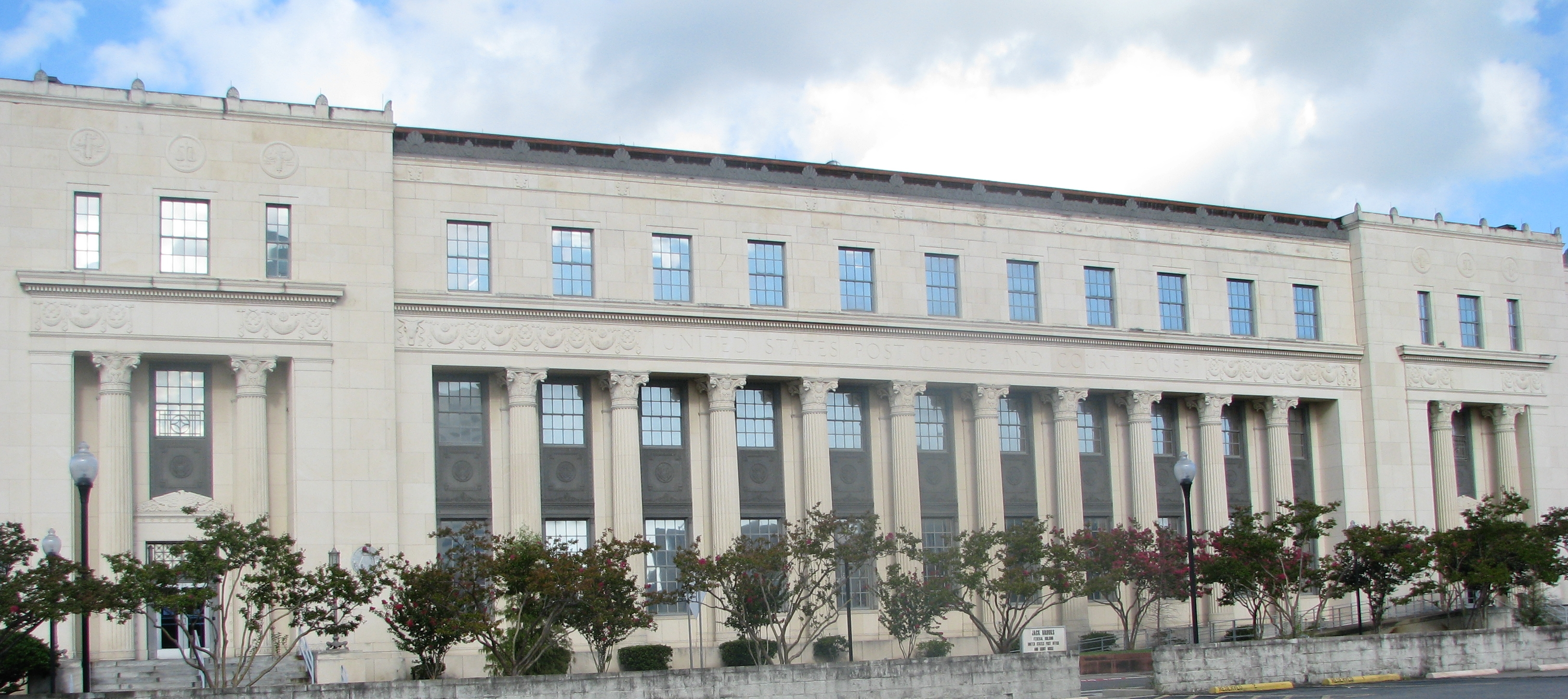
- Jack Brooks Federal Building in 2010

- Location within Texas Location within the United States
- Location: 300 Willow St., Beaumont, Texas
- Coordinates: 30°5′4″N 94°6′7.5″W
- Area: 2 acres (0.81 ha)
- Built: 1933
- Architect: Fred Stone; F.W. & Douglas E. Steinman
- Architectural style: Art Deco, Classical Revival
- Part of: Beaumont Commercial District (ID78002959)
- Designated CP: April 14, 1978

The Jack Brooks Federal Building is a federal office building in Beaumont, Texas. It was the United States Post Office and Federal Building Completed during the Great Depression in 1933. The building houses courtrooms and chambers of the United States District Court for the Eastern District of Texas, and an office of the United States Postal Service. In 1978, President Jimmy Carter came to Beaumont to officiate over the renaming of the building for Congressman Jack Brooks, who lived in and represented the area for many years.

The building features many Corinthian columns and has many detailed features. The building is listed on the National Register of Historic Places as a contributing property to the Beaumont Commercial District.

== See also ==
- National Register of Historic Places listings in Jefferson County, Texas
