= Beaumont Municipal Transit System =

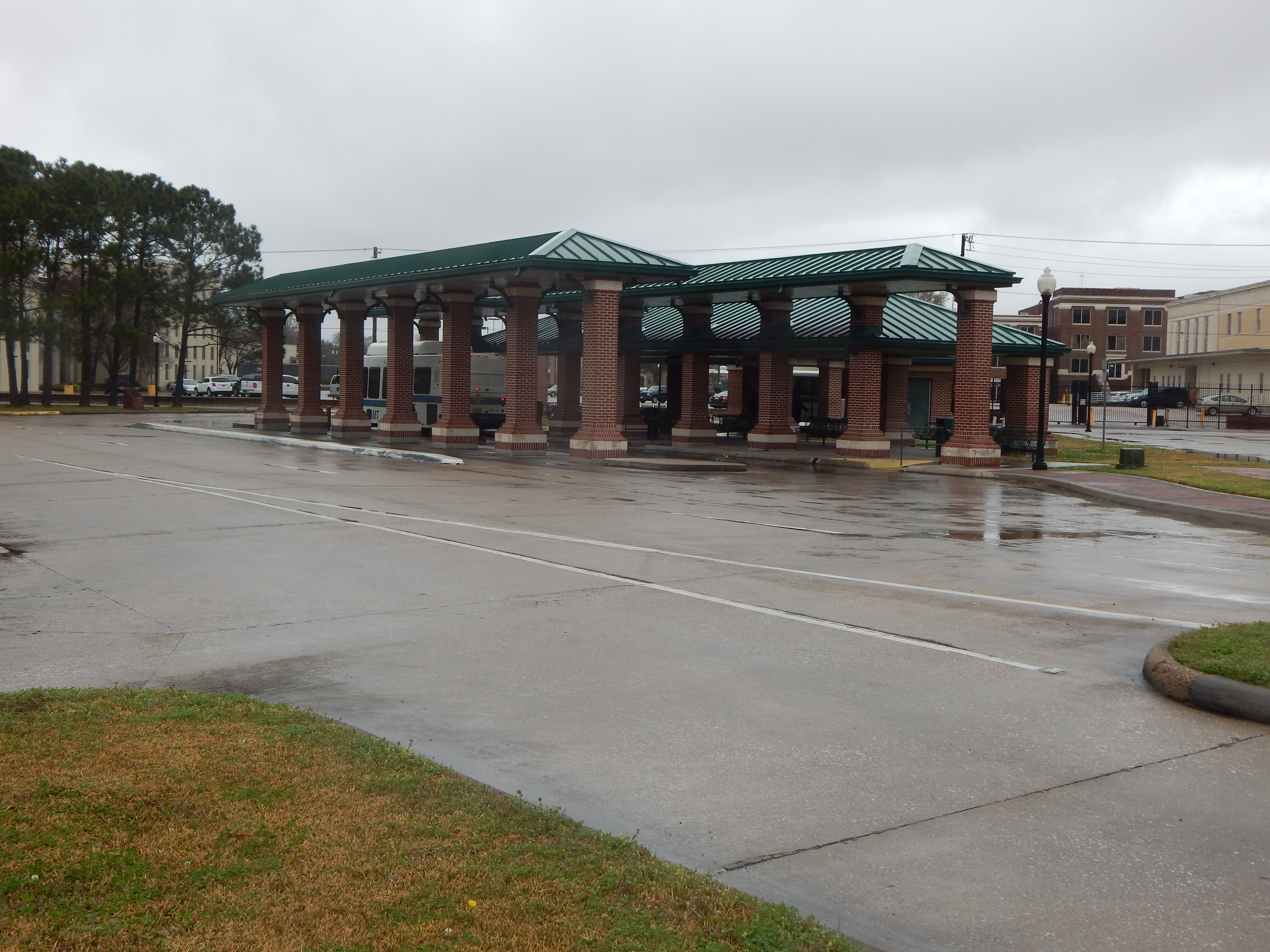
- Dannenbaum Station Transit Center
- Headquarters: 550 Milam Ave.
- Locale: Beaumont, Texas
- Service area: Beaumont, Texas
- Service type: bus service, paratransit
- Routes: 10
- Stations: 1
- Fleet: 17 buses 10 paratransit
- Fuel type: compressed natural gas
- Operator: First Transit
- Website: Official website

The Beaumont Municipal Transit System is the primary provider of mass transportation in Jefferson County, Texas. Ten routes are operated from Monday through Saturday. All routes terminate at the Dannebaum Station Transit Center.

Dannenbaum Station Transit Center, located adjacent to the site of a historic railroad depot, was built in 2000 at the cost of $670,000. It is located on Laurel Avenue and is bounded by Laurel on the south, Liberty on the north, Magnolia Avenue to the west, and Willow Street to the east at 30°05′01.6″N 94°06′10.6″W geographic coordinates (across the street from the Jack Brooks Federal Building).

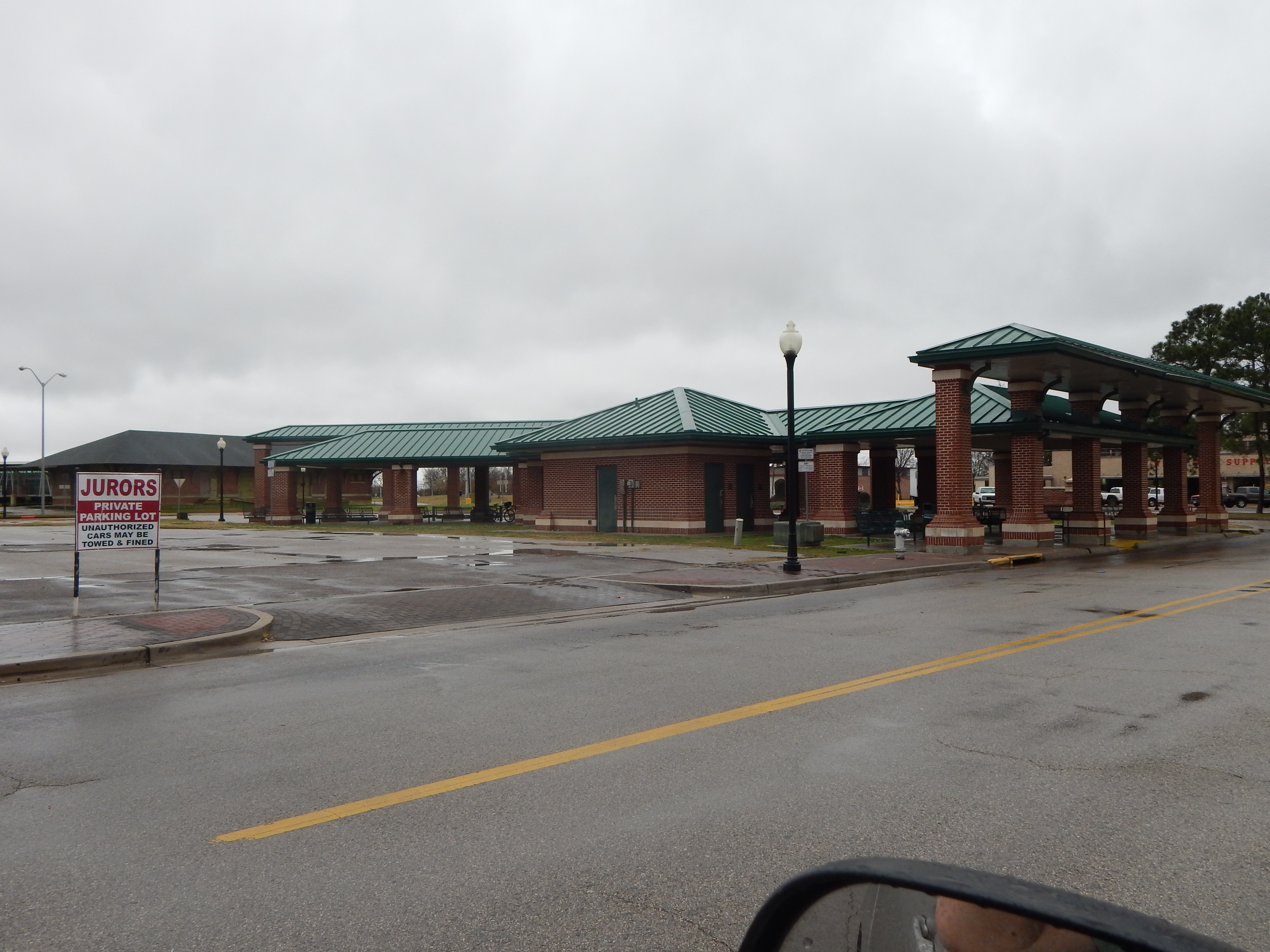
Another view of Dannenbaum Station

== Routes ==
- 1 Magnolia
- 2 Parkdale
- 3 Calder
- 4 South 11th
- 5 Pine
- 6 Refinery
- 7 South Park
- 8 Pear Orchard
- 9 Laurel
- 10 College St.
