= Tyrrell Historical Library =

- Tyrrell Public Library
- U.S. Historic district – Contributing property
- Recorded Texas Historic Landmark
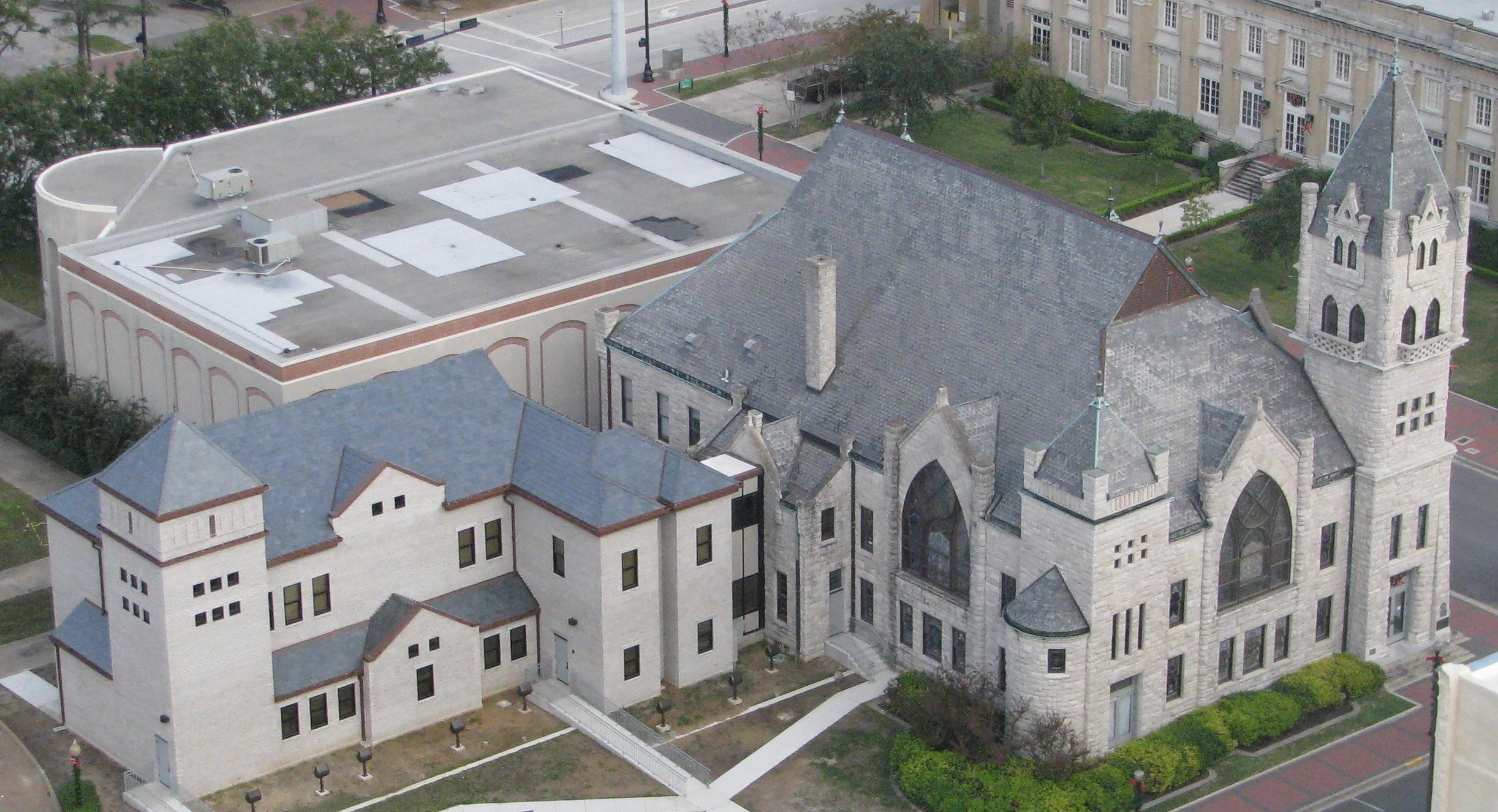
- Tyrrell Library in 2009

- Location within Texas Location within the United States
- Location: 695 Pearl St., Beaumont, Texas
- Coordinates: 30°04′56″N 94°05′48″W
- Area: less than one acre
- Built: 1903
- Architect: Alonzo N. Dawson
- Architectural style: Richardsonian Romanesque
- Part of: Beaumont Commercial District (ID78002959)
- RTHL No.: 10578

Significant dates
- Designated CP: April 14, 1978
- Designated RTHL: 1976

The Tyrrell Historical Library is a public library in Beaumont, Texas. Originally built in 1903 to serve as the First Baptist Church, the building displays a mix of Richardsonian Romanesque and Victorian Gothic architectures, with pointed arch windows and quatrefoils, and all of its original stained glass. The building became vacant in 1923 when the congregation moved to a new location. It was bought by Captain W. C. Tyrrell, who donated the building to the city for use as its first public library. The building is listed in the National Register of Historic Places and also as a Recorded Texas Historic Landmark. It is also a contributing property to the Downtown Historic District.

After renovations, the library opened in 1926, serving as the main public library until 1974. Following construction of a new facility, this one was renamed as the "Tyrrell Historical Library," in honor of the philanthropist. It is the center repository of extensive genealogical archives and the library maintains a hallmark Texana collection. It was remodeled with systems upgrades in 1990. An addition was constructed in 2010, reflecting the main building's style without trying to recreate it.

== Photo gallery ==
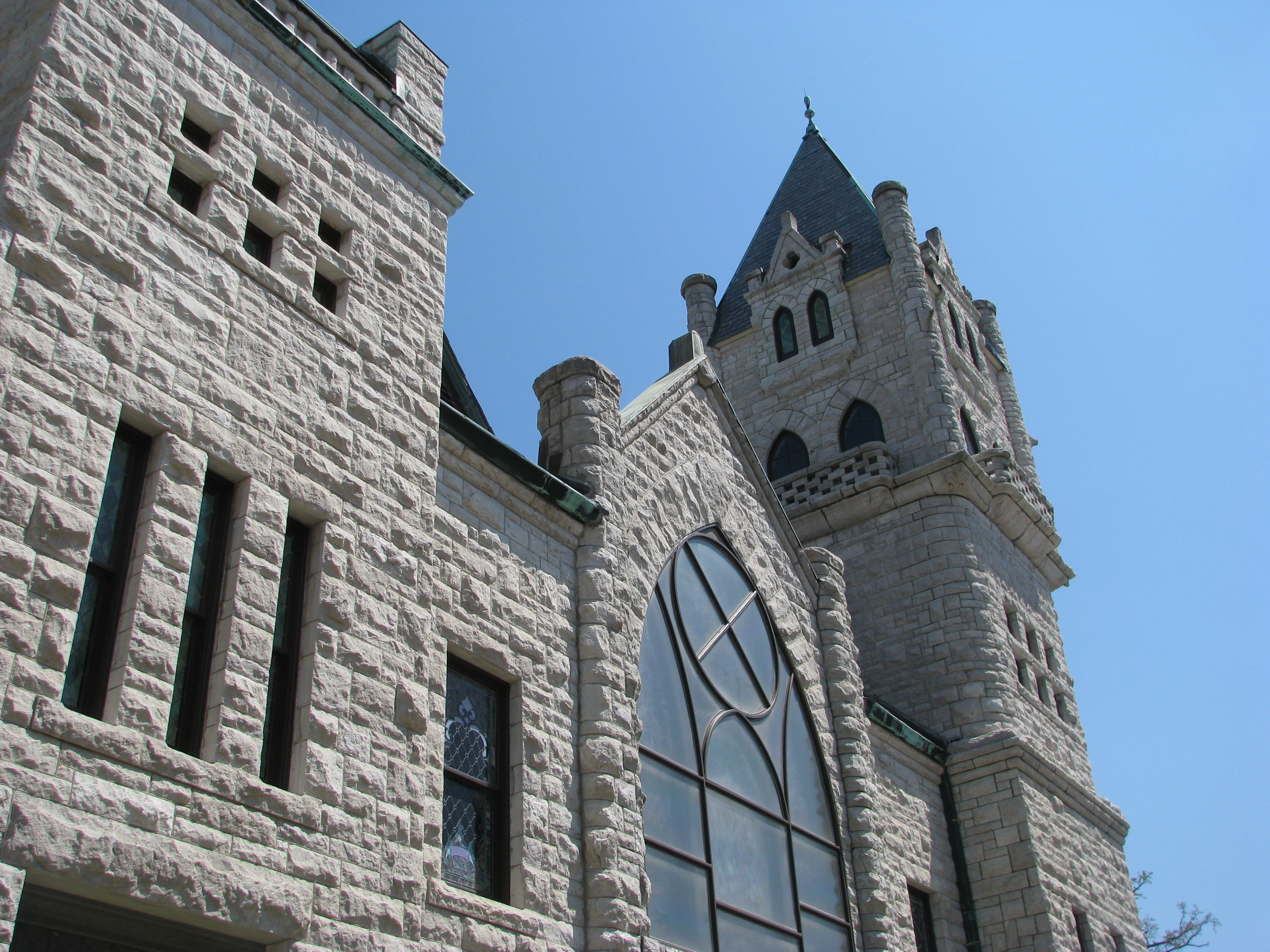

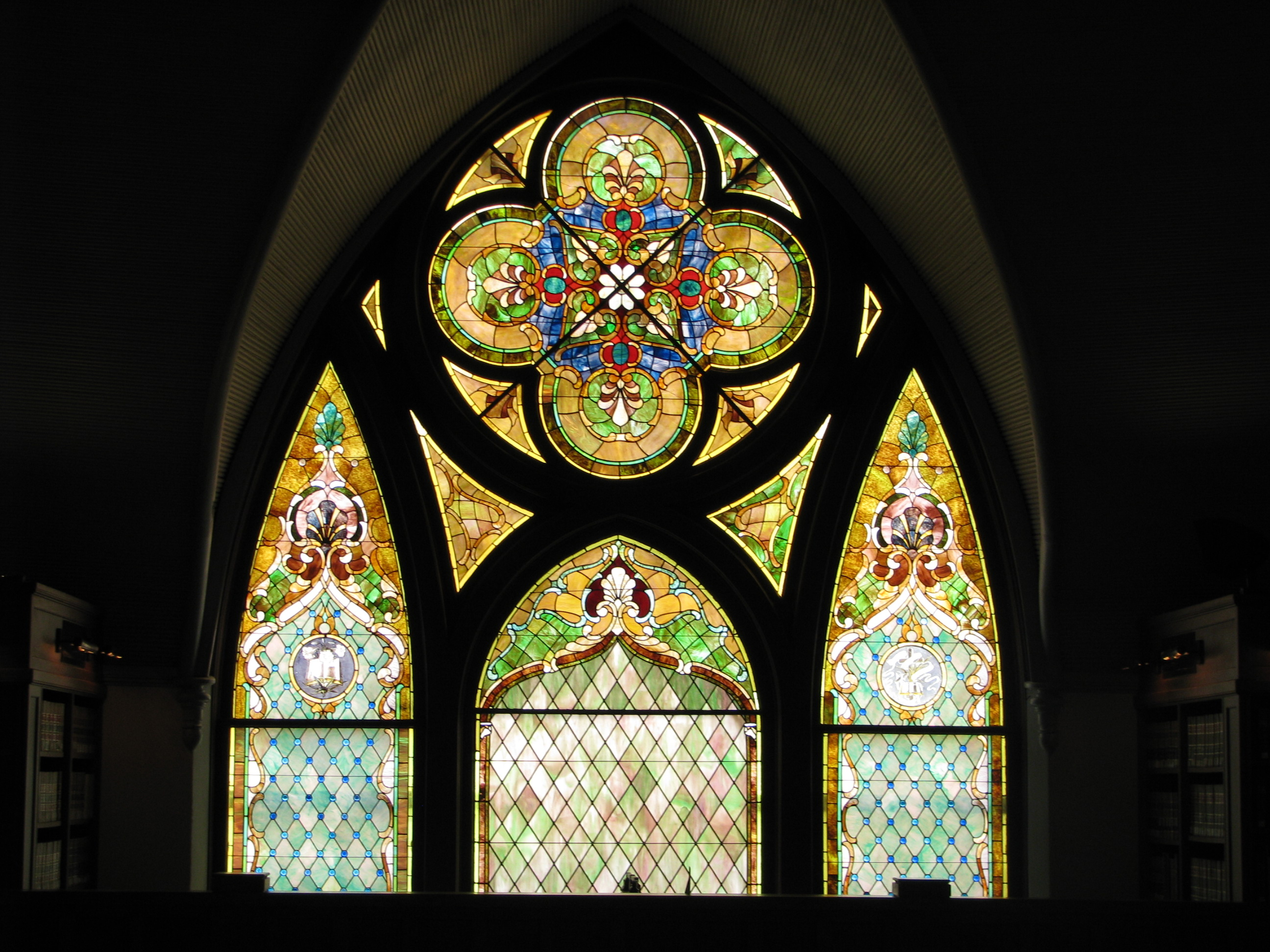

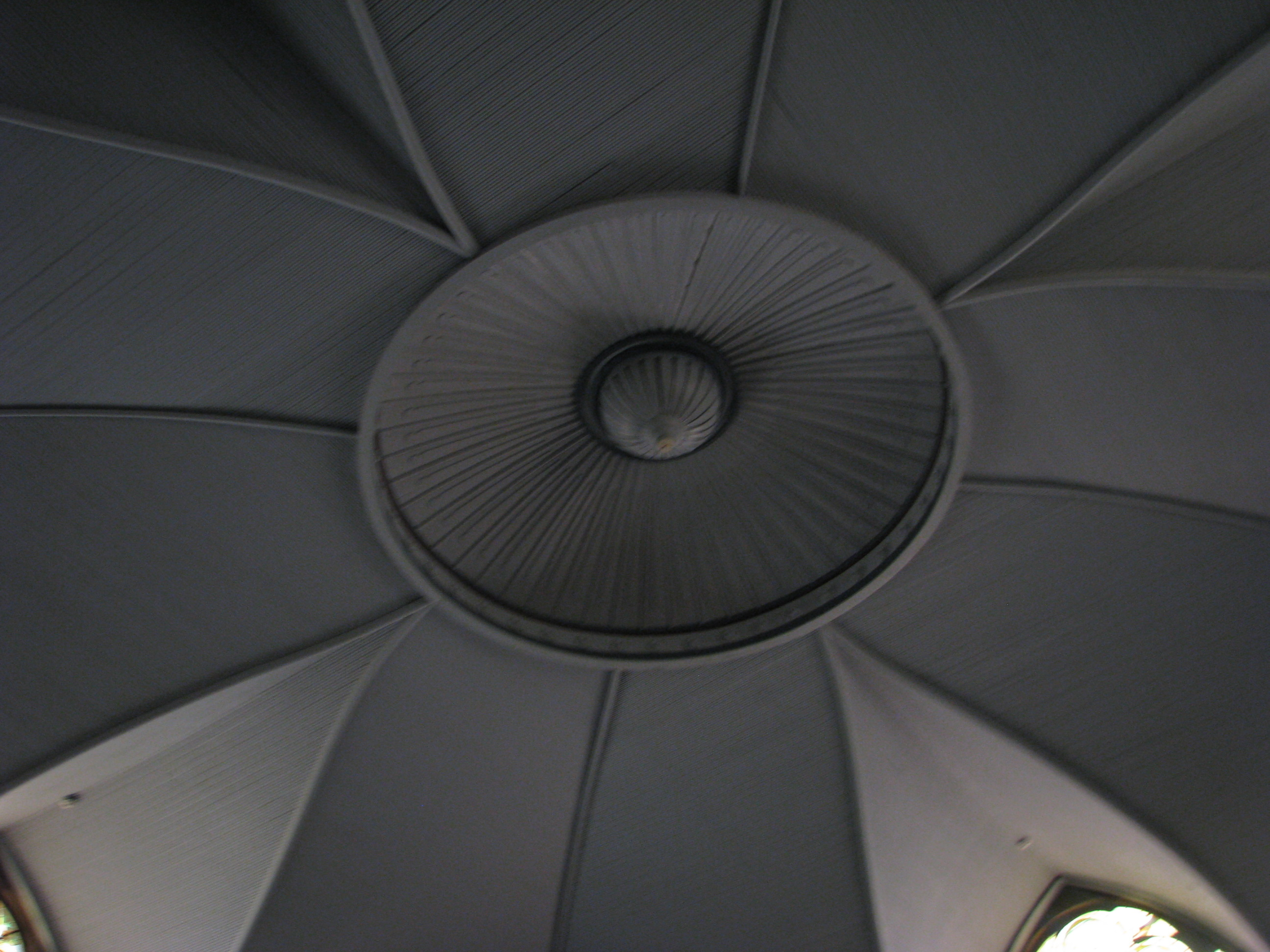

== See also ==
- National Register of Historic Places listings in Jefferson County, Texas
- Recorded Texas Historic Landmarks in Jefferson County
