= Art Museum of Southeast Texas =

Art museum in Beaumont, Texas

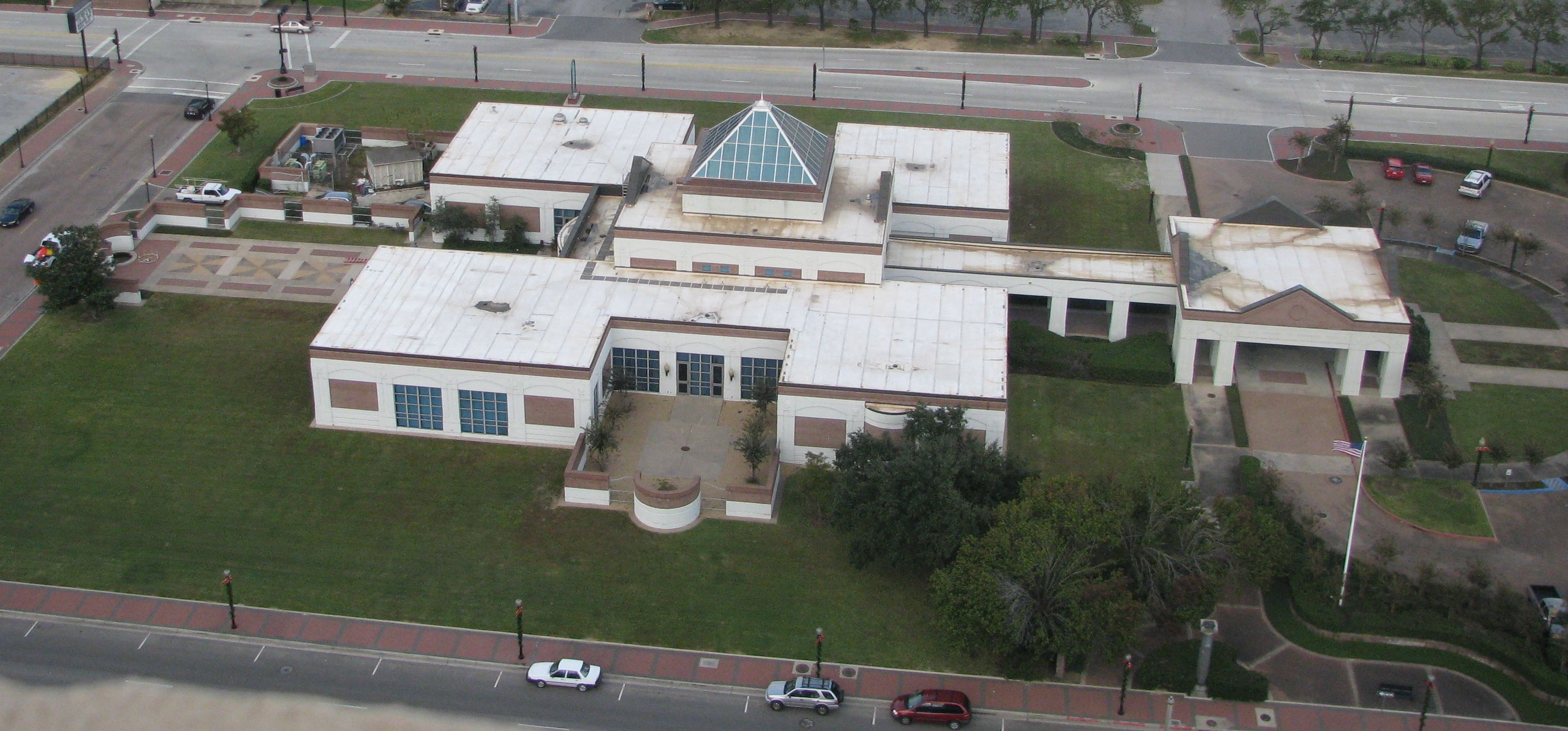

- Location within Texas
- Established: September 14, 1950
- Location: 500 Main Street; Beaumont, Texas 77701
- Coordinates: 30.083812°N 94.097579°W
- Accreditation: American Alliance of Museums
- Executive director: Noël Merriam
- Curator: Caitlin Clay
- Website: www.amset.org

The Art Museum of Southeast Texas (AMSET) is an art museum in Beaumont, Texas, United States. Established in 1950 as the Beaumont Art Museum, it acquired its current name in 1987. It exhibits 19th-21st century regional fine art and folk art from the U.S. and Mexico.

== History ==
Incorporated in the state of Texas on September 14, 1950, the Beaumont Art Museum was originally housed on the lower floor of a two-story rented house on Calder Avenue in Beaumont. In September 1956, the S. Perry Brown family donated funds to build a facility on the Southeast Texas State Fairgrounds. This building now houses the Beaumont Art League. In 1969, the family of J. Crooke Wilson donated their estate to the City of Beaumont for the purpose of housing the Beaumont Art Museum. The donation was contingent upon the City of Beaumont providing professional direction and a dedicated educational focus to the Museum. The five-acre property was located in Old Town, Beaumont's historic district. On September 10, 1987, after completing a comprehensive capital drive which brought in $4.2 million, the Beaumont Art Museum was reborn as the Art Museum of Southeast Texas and found its current home at 500 Main Street in Beaumont.

== Exhibitions & Collections ==
Over the years, AMSET's permanent collection has grown from 200 to nearly 2,000 objects, focusing its collections on contemporary Texas artists and regional folk art.

AMSET hosts eight to ten exhibitions each year, some of which are organized in-house and travel on to other venues.

In August 2007, AMSET opened a semi-permanent gallery featuring the folk art totems of Beaumont self-taught artist Felix “Fox” Harris. Harris’ work had an eventful history at the museum – from its installation in outdoor areas, to de-installations due to hurricane threats, to criticism from the community, to many years in storage – the totems finally found a resting place in the newly dedicated gallery inspired by Harris’ home site. AMSET is one of the earliest museums in the United States to collect artwork by contemporary self-taught artists.
