= Automobilia =

Automobilia (a portmanteau of the words automobile and memorabilia) is any historical artifact or collectible linked with motor cars and related areas, such as motor racing and motorsport personalities. In common usage the term is taken to specifically exclude fully or partially complete vehicles, although componentry may be termed automobilia if its ownership is primarily for memento value rather than for practical use. Artifacts included within automobilia may be highly varied in nature, ranging from those linked with motoring in a general sense (e.g. an in-car tool kit) to those intrinsically linked with a specific vehicle or event (e.g. the steering wheel from a particular Formula One car, used during a notable Grand Prix race). Many people around the world are collectors of automobilia, and most autojumble sale events have a sizeable number of automobilia traders. In addition, at the upper end of the market, major auction houses such as Bonhams regularly hold specialist automobilia sales. Most collectors limit themselves to an isolated area of automobilia, commonly linked by a unifying theme. Examples of popular automobilia collection themes could include items connected to an individual, such as a motor racing driver, or objects of a specific type, such as radiator mascots. Art, models, books, toys, flags and clothing, while not directly linked with a vehicle, may also be termed automobilia if they have a motoring theme.

== See also ==
Media related to Automobilia at Wikimedia Commons

- Petroliana, collectibles related to gas stations or the petroleum industry
- List of petroleum and gas museums
