= Petroliana =

Collectibles related to gas stations or the petroleum industry

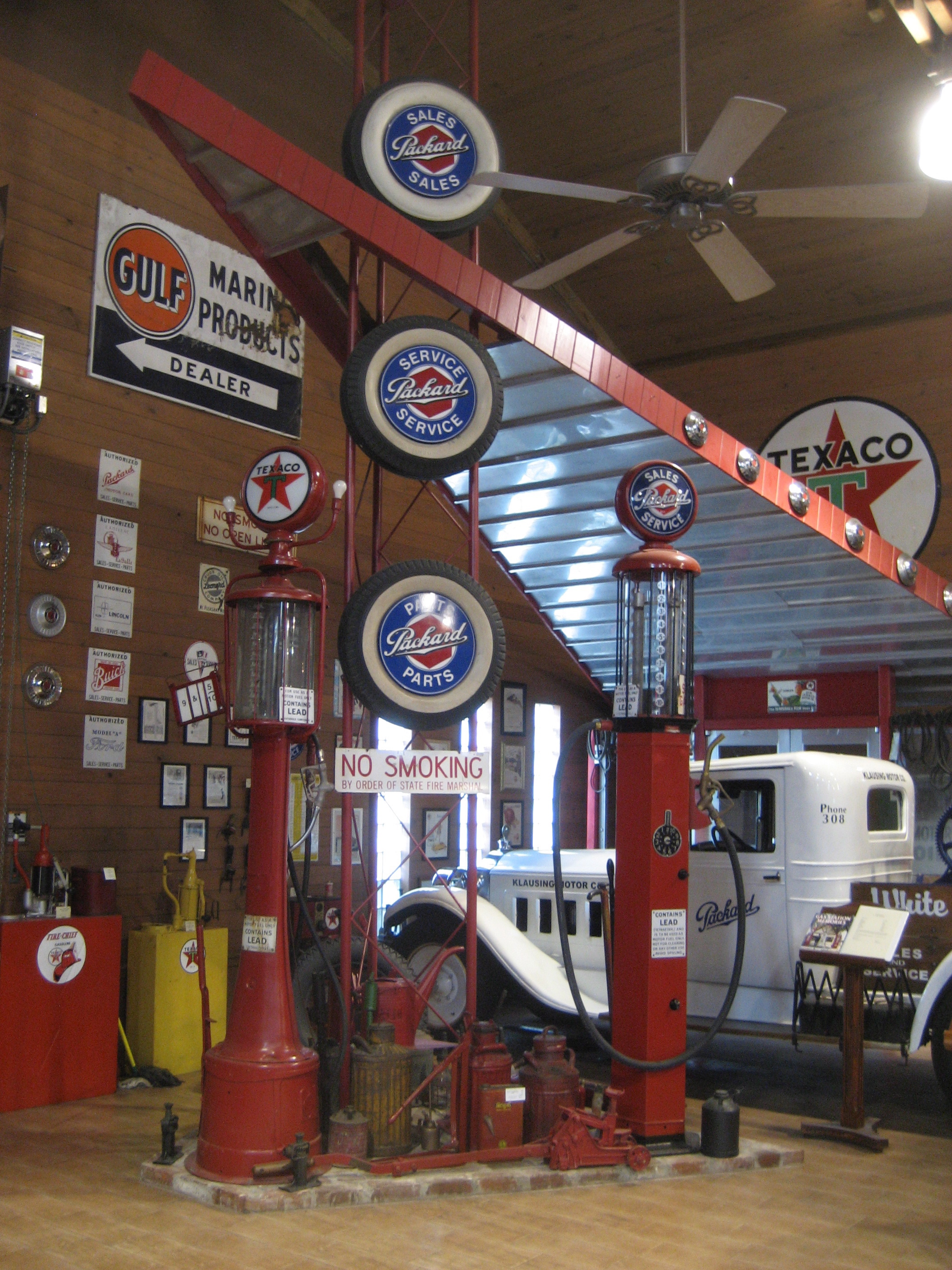
Petroliana on display at the Fort Lauderdale Antique Car Museum, Texas

Petroliana is a category of collectibles that is related to gas stations or the petroleum industry. Petroliana memorabilia includes items such as old gas pumps, fuel advertisements, enamel or tin signs, oil cans and tins, and road maps.

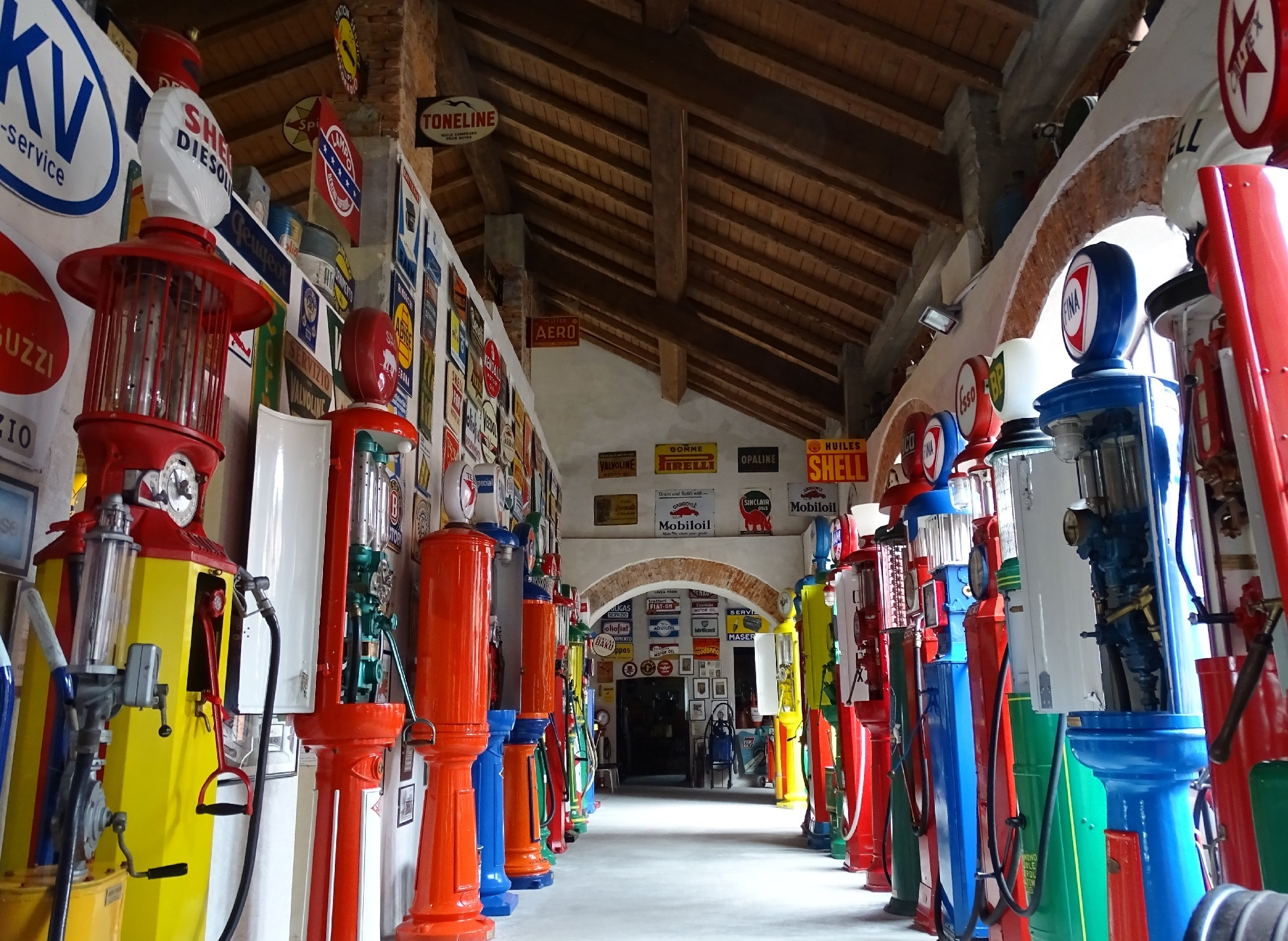
Fisogni Museum, in Italy, with the largest collection of petroliana in the world (Guinness World Record)

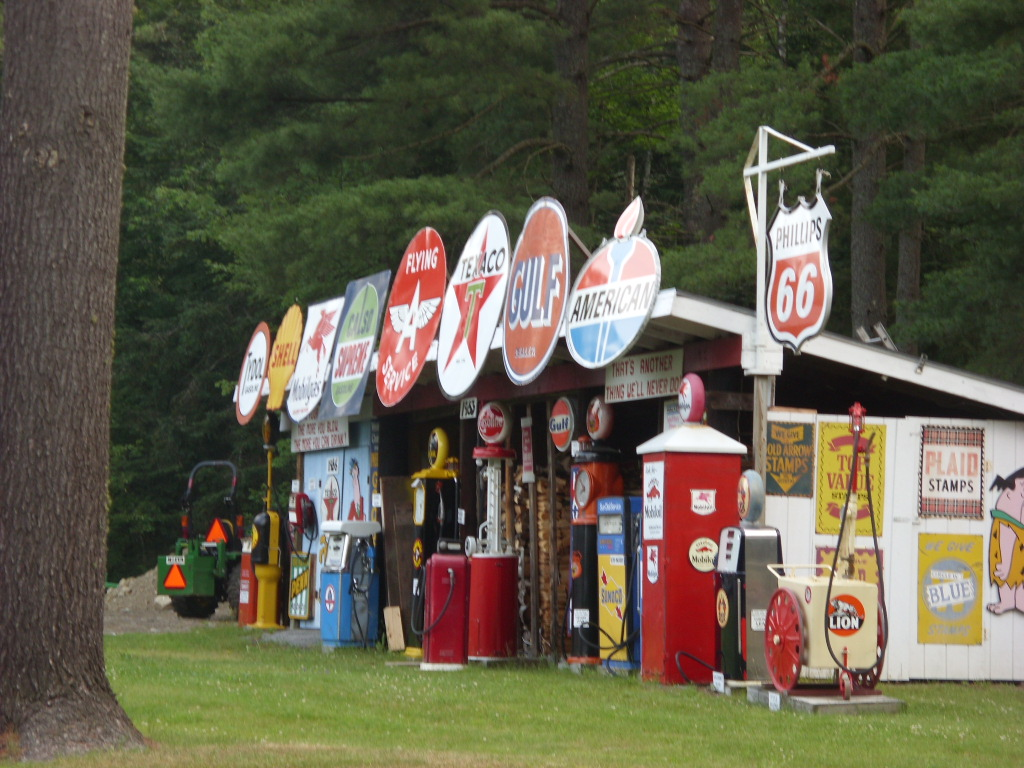
Roadside petroliana along New Hampshire Route 116

== See also ==
- Automobilia
- List of petroleum and gas museums
