= Hathaway Ranch & Oil Museum =

- Location: 11901 East Florence Avenue; Santa Fe Springs, California
- Coordinates: 33.935595°N 118.079786°W
- Type: History museum
- Website: http://www.hathawayranchmuseum.org

The Hathaway Ranch & Oil Museum in Santa Fe Springs, California is a museum of five generations of Hathaway family and Southern California history. The five-acre facility includes hundreds of artifacts and buildings showing the initial usage of the land in farming and ranching, as well as the major transition when oil was discovered in the area.

The property includes a machine shop with multiple antique machine tools that are powered with flat belts from an overhead line shaft. This system, which allowed all the machinery to be powered by one steam engine, rather than individual electric motors on the machines, was common in machine shops a century ago. The shop is fully intact from when it was in use, and looks as though the machinist just stepped out for a moment.

The property has a 1933 Spanish-Mediterranean-style ranch house on it, as well as another home, in which members of the Hathaway family lived. The home's architecture and contents represent a time capsule from that era.

The numerous outbuildings are a reflection of the needs of a working ranch as well as the oil industry. The museum houses one of the largest collections of steam engines, antique farm machinery, vintage diesel engines, and oil field equipment in the region.

== See also ==
- List of petroleum museums
