= W. H. Smith Hardware Company Building =

- U.S. National Register of Historic Places
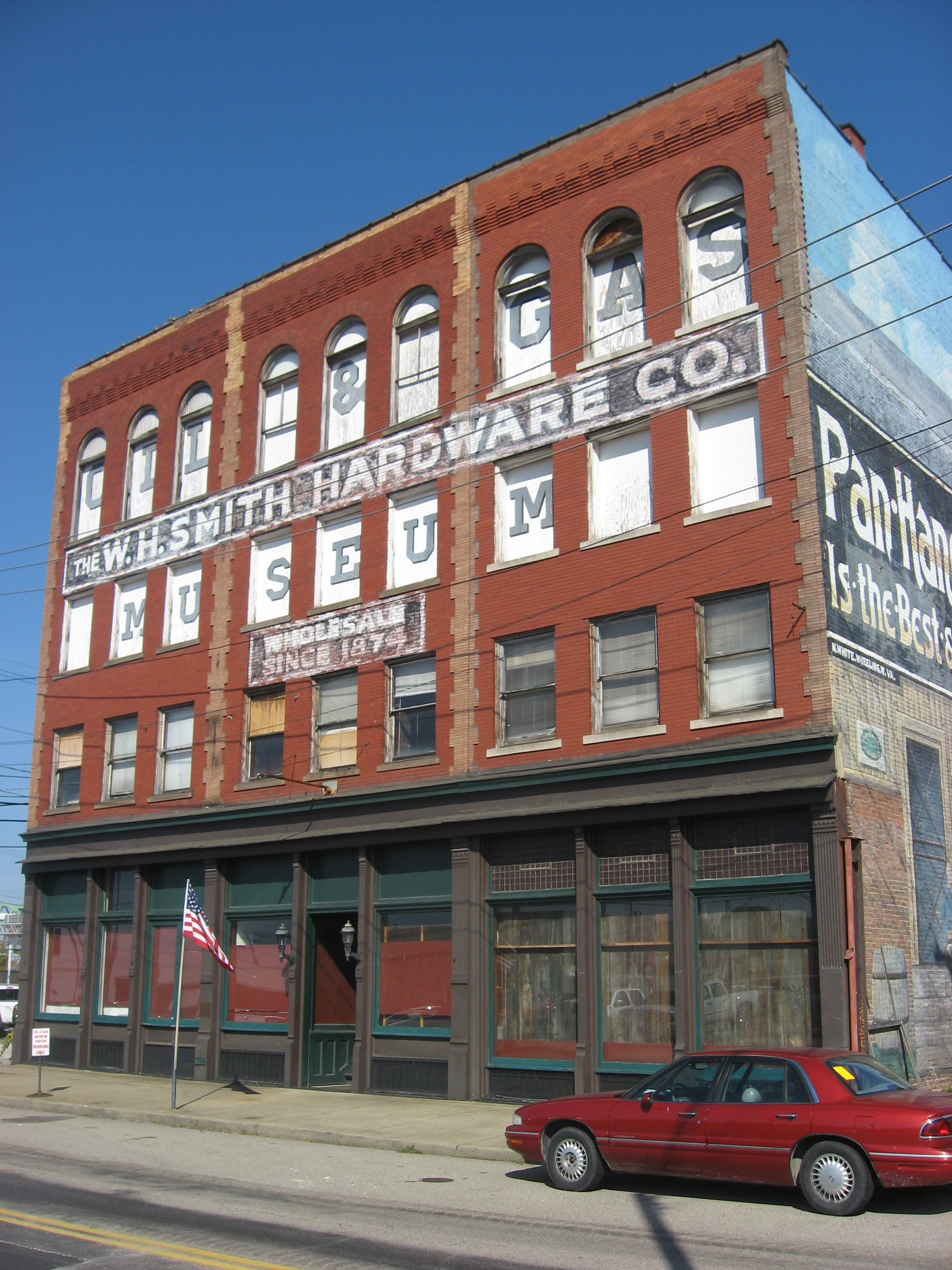
- Front of the building

- Location within West Virginia Location within the United States
- Location: 119 3rd St., Parkersburg, West Virginia
- Coordinates: 39°15′58″N 81°33′50″W
- Area: less than one acre
- Built: 1899
- Architectural style: Romanesque
- NRHP reference No.: 03000349
- Added to NRHP: May 2, 2003

W. H. Smith Hardware Company Building, also known as the Oil and Gas Museum of the Oil, Gas and Industrial Historical Association, is a historic commercial building located at Parkersburg, Wood County, West Virginia. It was built in 1899, on the foundation of a building built about 1874. It is a four-story, masonry building with Romanesque Revival architectural details. The rectangular building measure 60 by 120 feet (18 by 37 m), with an 18-by-12-foot (5.5 by 3.7 m) outcrop. It housed the W. H. Smith Hardware Company, until the 1980s. It now houses the Oil and Gas Museum.

It was listed on the National Register of Historic Places in 2003.

== See also ==
- List of petroleum museums
- National Register of Historic Places listings in Wood County, West Virginia
