= Norwegian Petroleum Museum =

Museum in Stavanger, Norway

Coordinates: 58°58′25″N 5°44′05″E

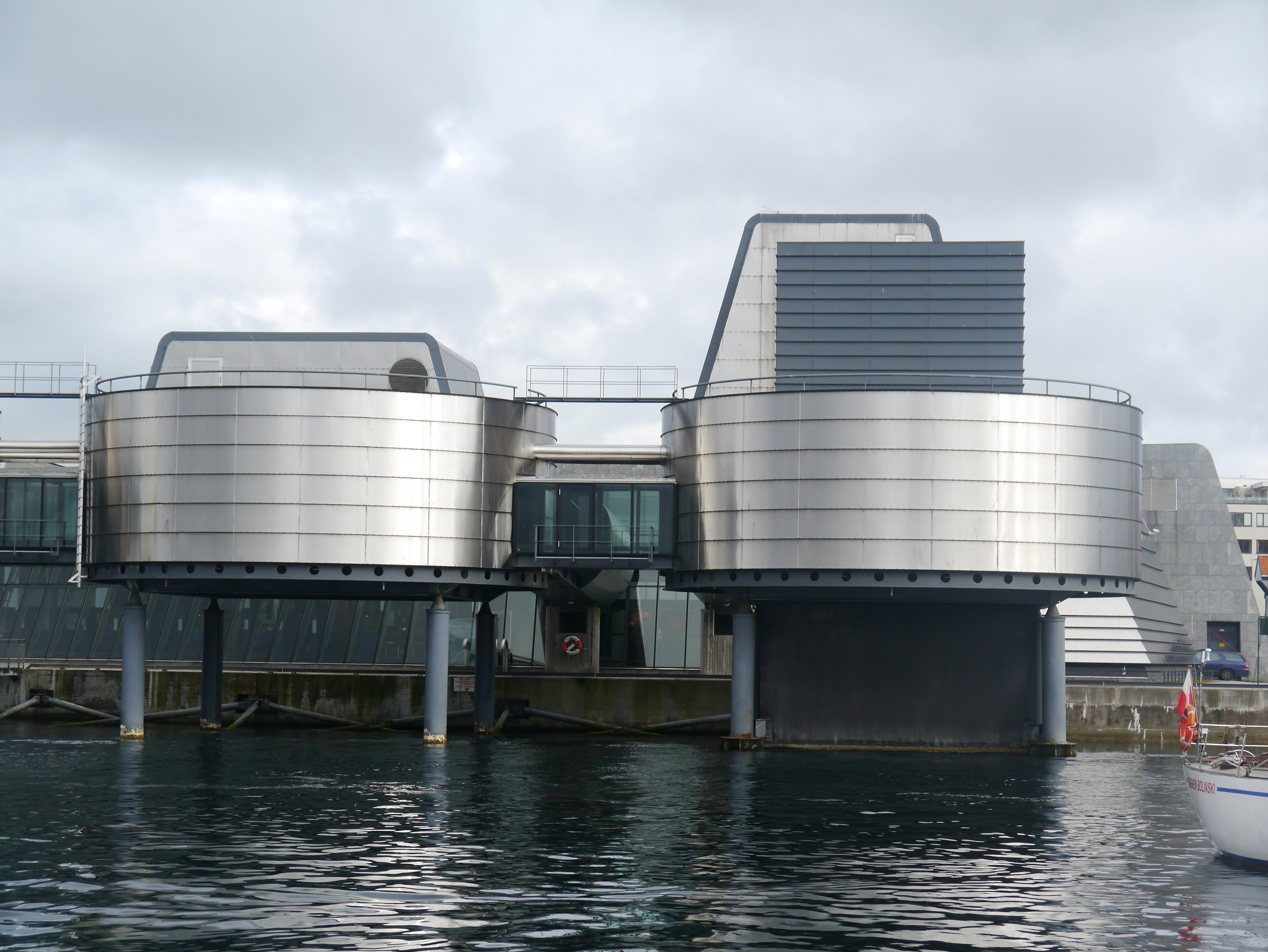
Norwegian Petroleum Museum

The Norwegian Petroleum Museum (Norsk Oljemuseum) is a museum documenting Norwegian oil and gas activities, located in Stavanger, Norway.

== Overview ==
It was designed by the architectural firm of Lunde & Løvseth Arkitekter A/S and was opened on 20 May 1999. Seen from the sea the museum looks like a small oil platform. The unusual architecture has made the museum a landmark in the Port of Stavanger.

The museum was built in stone, glass and concrete and covers approx. 5,000 square meters. The museum focuses on offshore petroleum activity especially in the North Sea. The museum displays objects, films, photographs and other materials have been collected that document Norwegian oil and gas activities. The museum shows the technological development from the beginning of the Norwegian oil history in the mid-1960s, from the first North Sea drilling platforms, through steel and concrete platforms developed and built in Norway, to modern, flexible production ships and subsea systems.

== Gallery ==
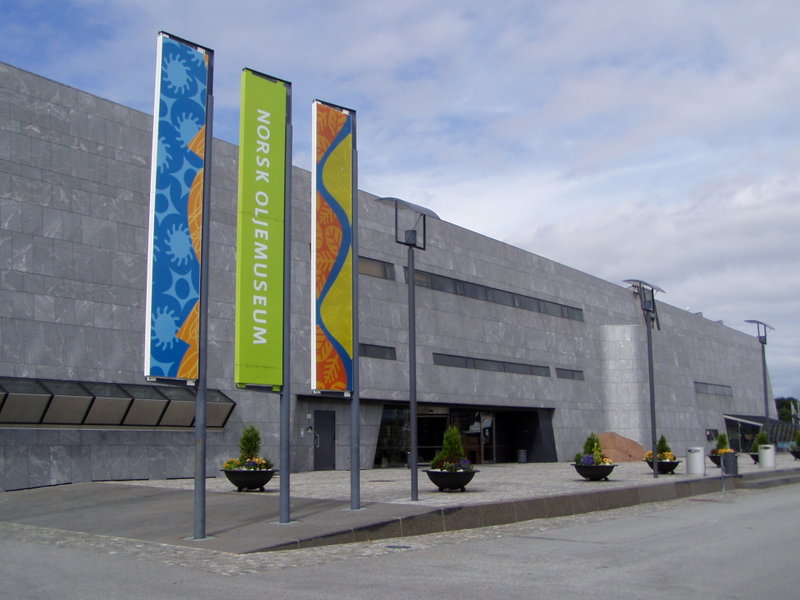
Entrance area

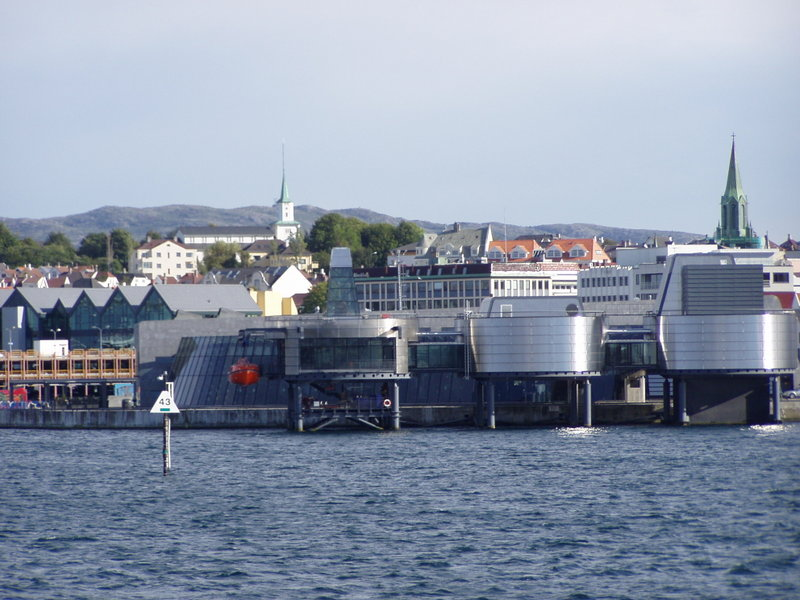
Museum seen from the North Sea

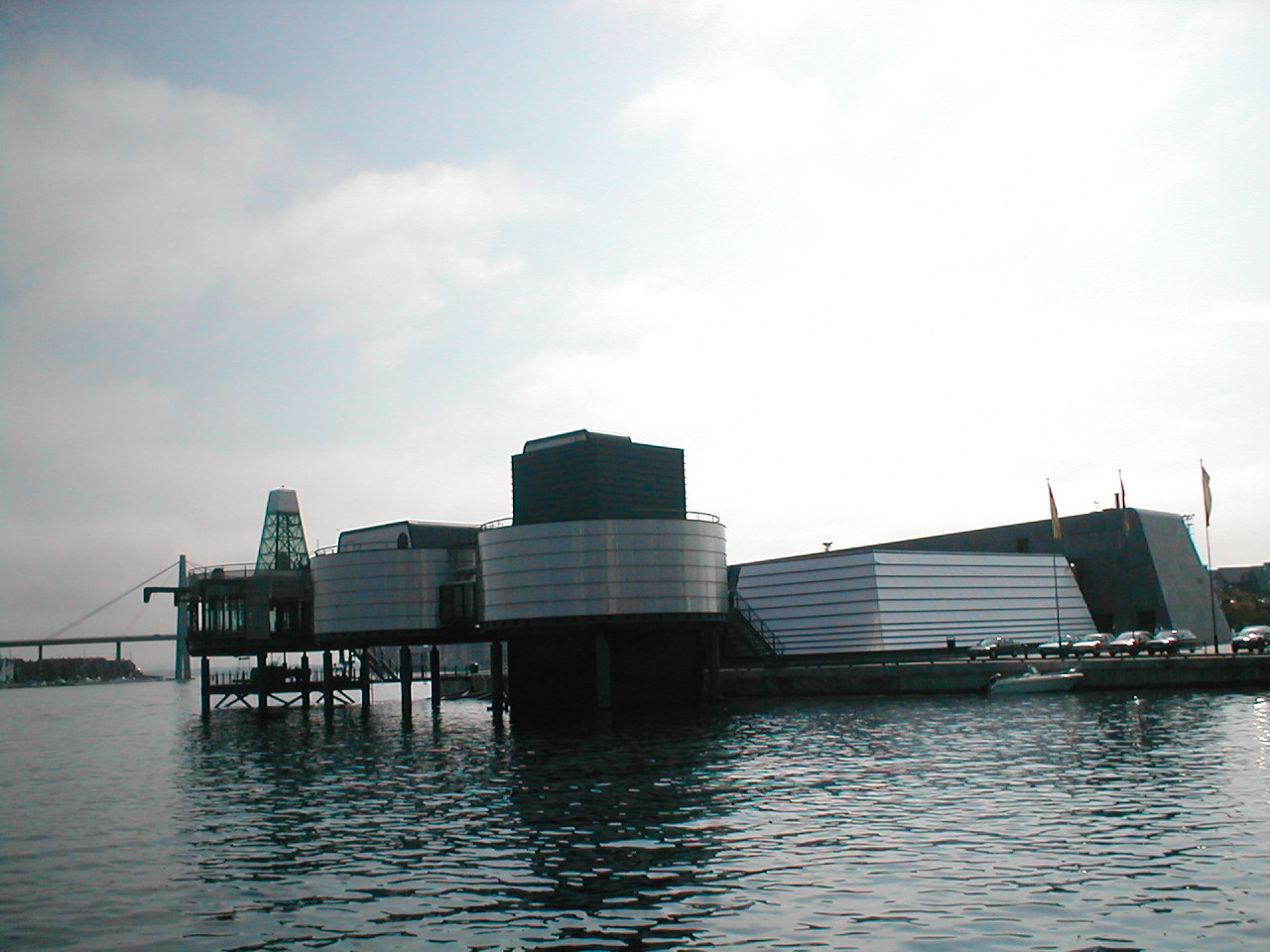
Museum seen from the harbour

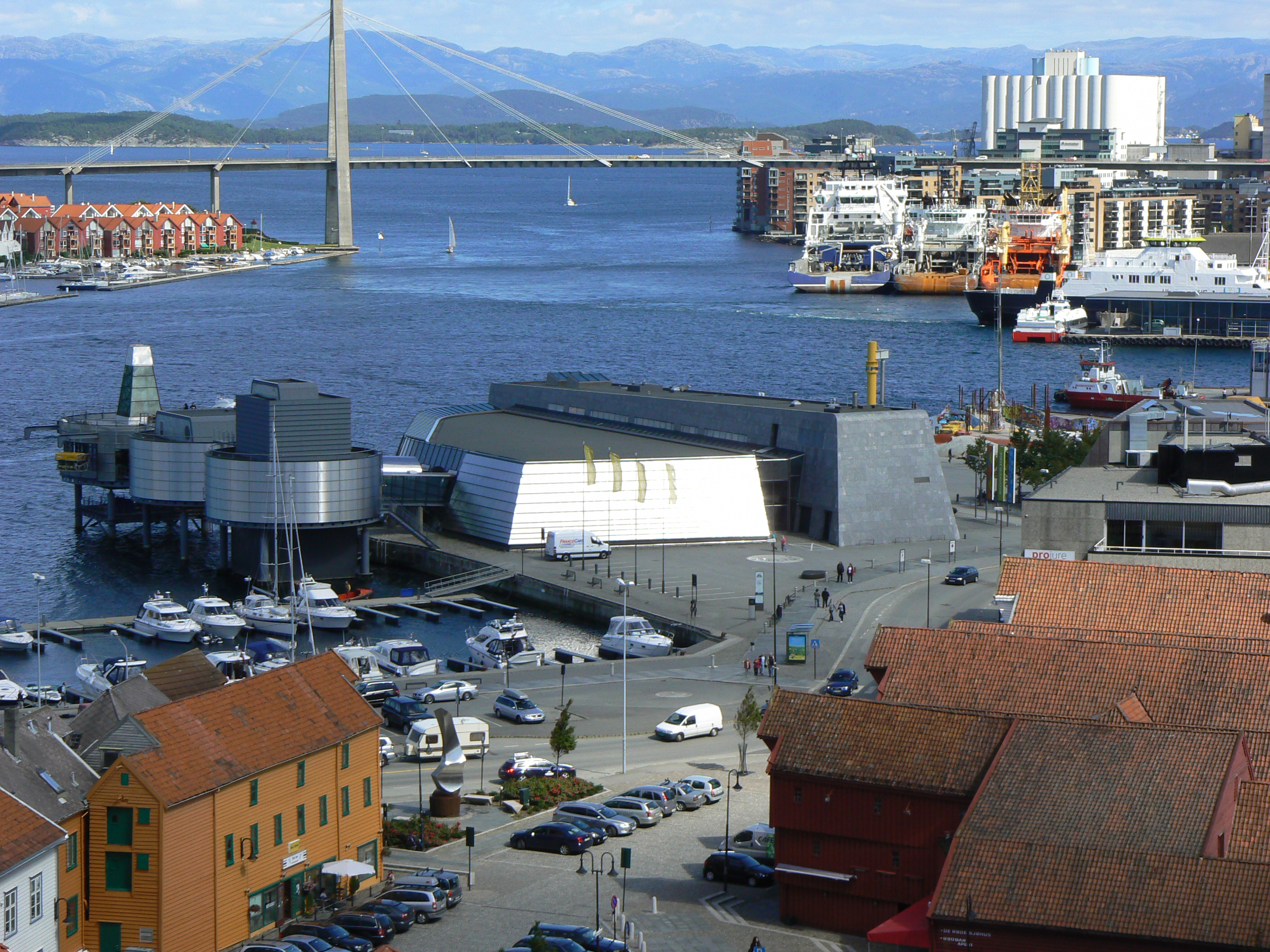
Museum and view of harbour

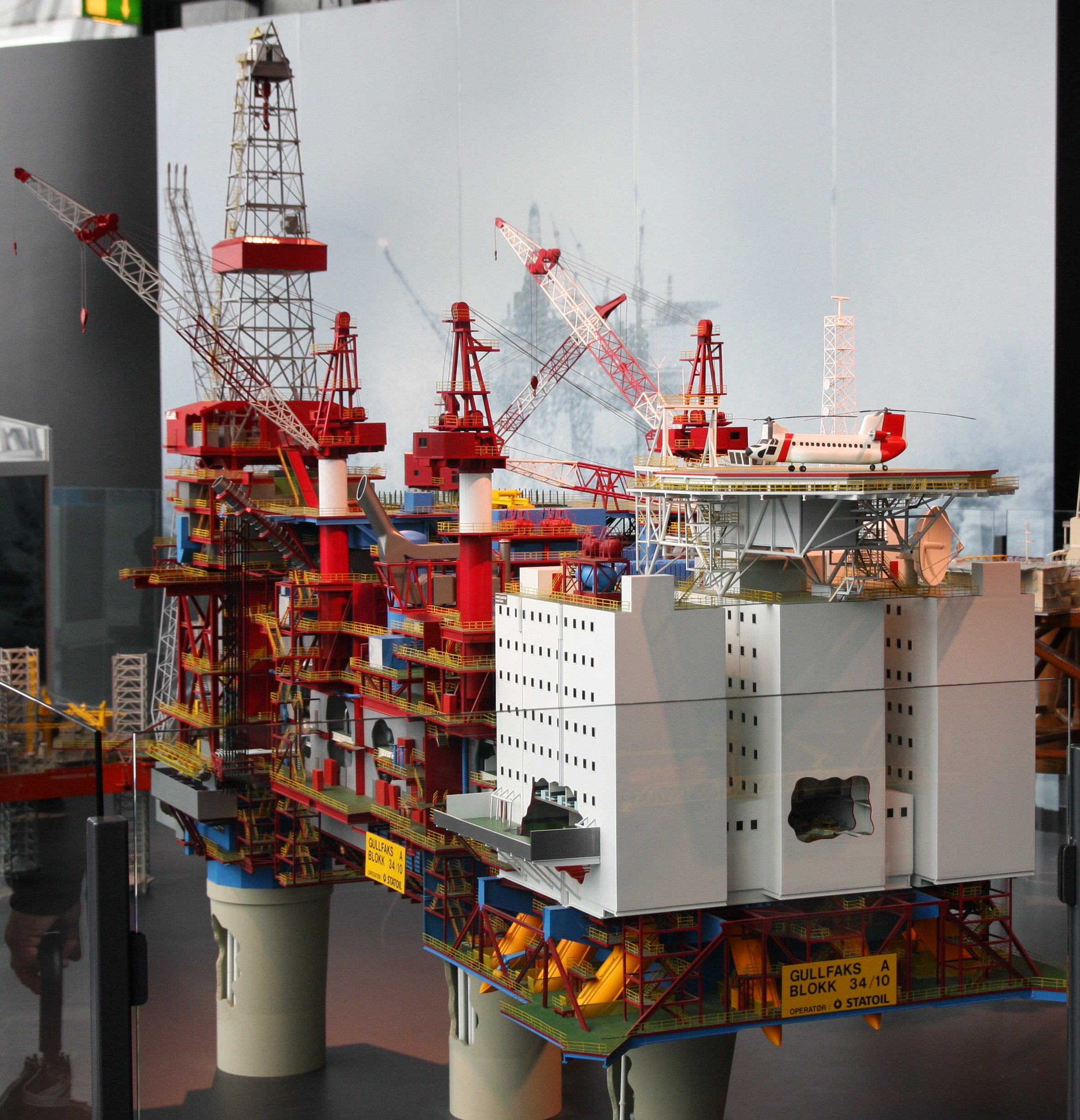
Gullfaks display

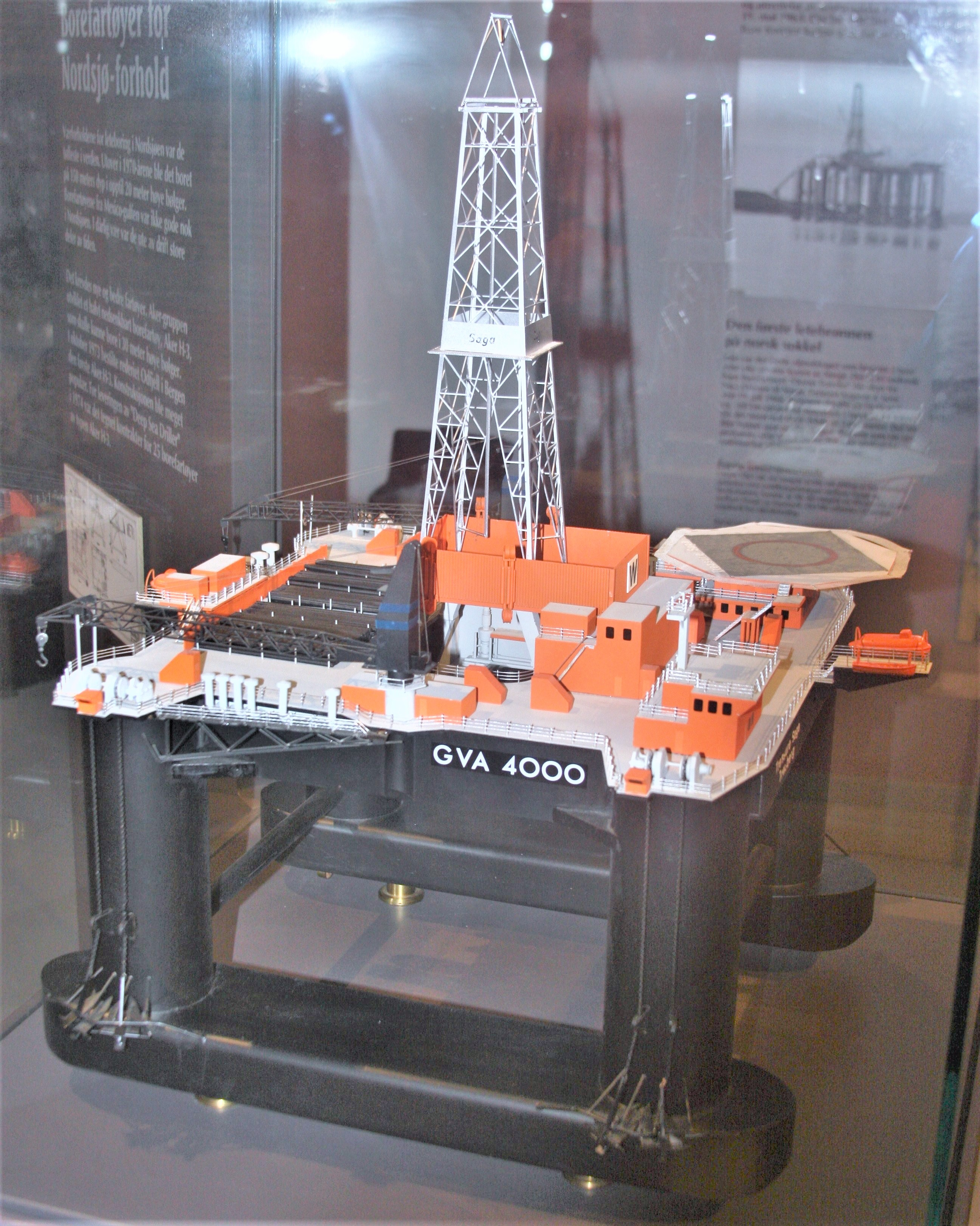
Treasure Saga display

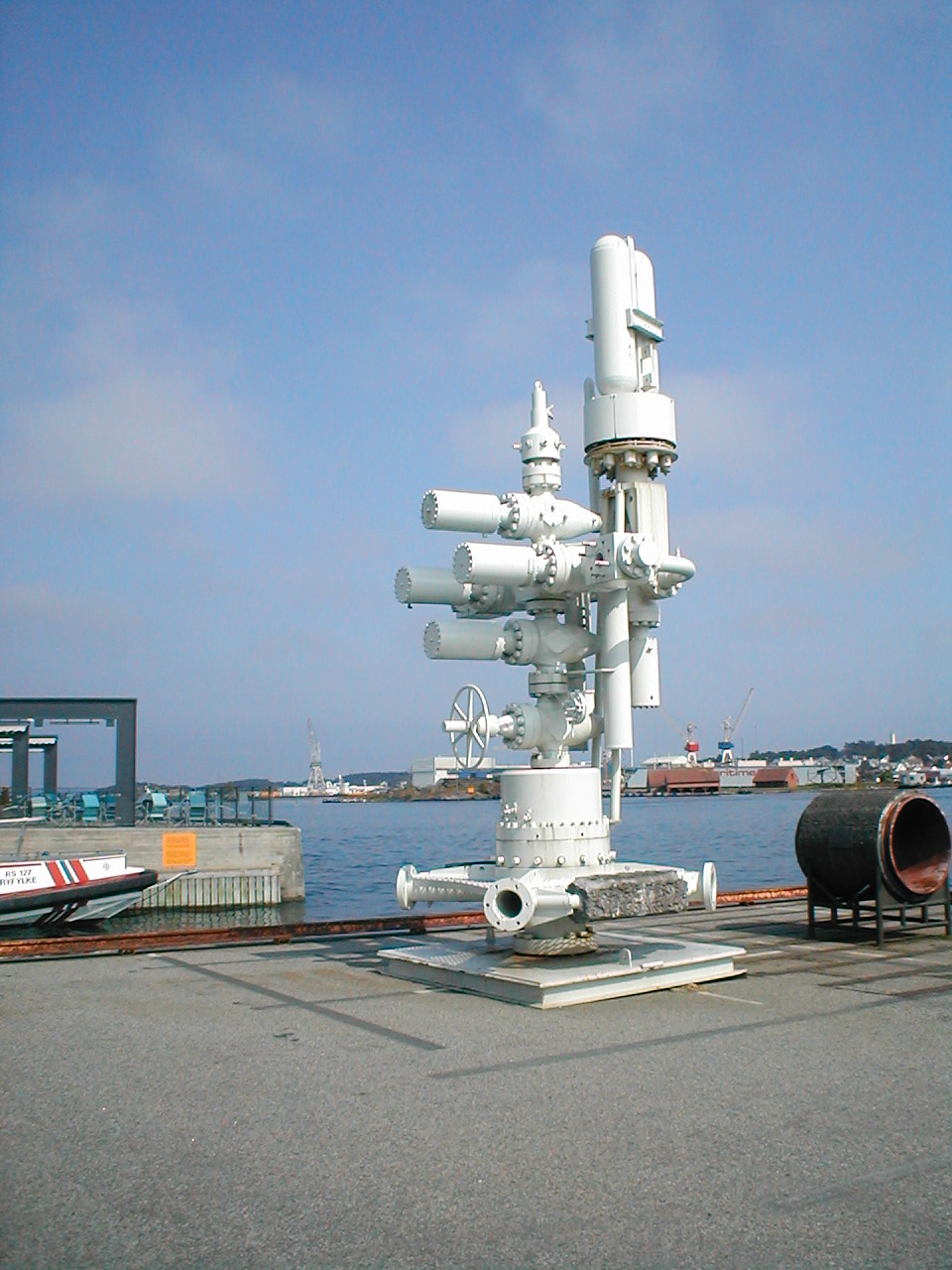
Oil well Christmas tree

== See also ==
- List of petroleum museums
