= Ocean Star Offshore Drilling Rig & Museum =

Petroleum museum in Galveston, Texas, US

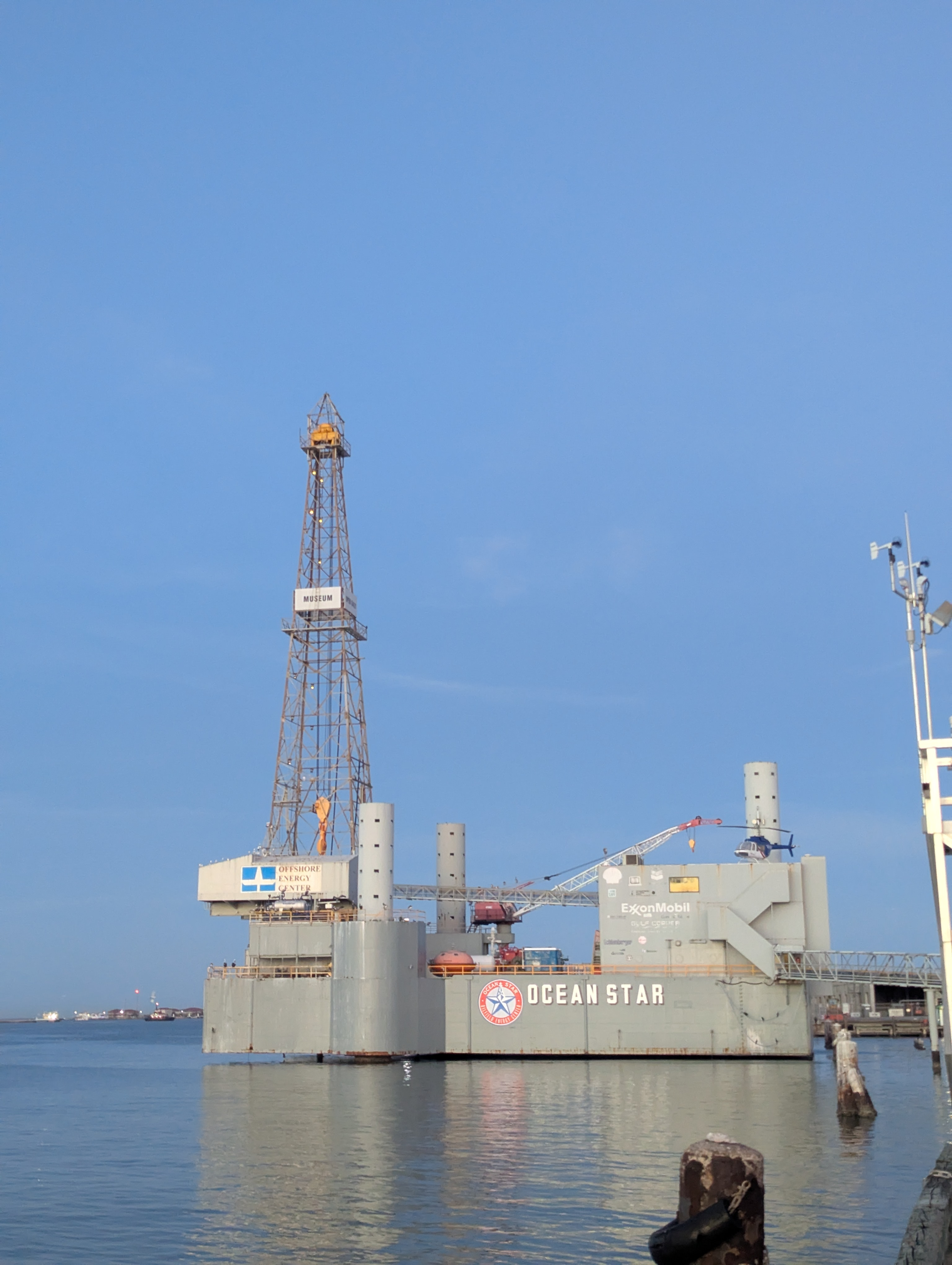
- Established: April 27, 1997; 29 years ago
- Location: 2002 Wharf Rd, Galveston, TX 77550, United States
- Coordinates: 29.311525871834°N 94.79069369970°W
- Type: Oil & gas museum

The Ocean Star Offshore Drilling Rig & Museum, located in Galveston, Texas, is a museum dedicated to the offshore oil and gas industry. Located next to the Strand National Historic Landmark District, the museum is housed on a retired jack-up rig set up in the Galveston harbor.

== History ==
The Ocean Star was built in 1969 in Beaumont, Texas by Bethlehem Shipbuilding Corporation (Hull Number 6845) for the Ocean Drilling and Exploration Company (ODECO) fleet. She worked in the Gulf of Mexico throughout the Texas and Louisiana Gulf Coast and drilled approximately 200 wells during her active life. The museum, sponsored by the Offshore Energy Center (OEC), is a non-profit organization funded through private donations, admissions, and corporate donations. The OEC acquired the Ocean Star and spent 2 years converting her into the museum. The museum opened to the public on April 27, 1997. In 2022, the Offshore Energy Center was renamed to the Energy Education Foundation, in an effort to broaden the scope of education to include all energy sources as well.

== Exhibits ==
- Offshore Drilling: The Promise of Discovery takes visitors on a behind-the-scenes journey of the technical process of extracting oil and gas offshore.
- The Hall of Fame, located within the museum, recognizes those persons and technologies that took the industry to sea, such as engineering giant Brown & Root founders George and Herman Brown; Ralph Thomas McDermott, who founded the offshore drilling and platform construction company J. Ray McDermott; rig designer and drilling contractor Alden J. "Doc" Laborde; former president George H. W. Bush; and oil company tycoon Dean McGee.
- The Pipe Deck houses exhibits and equipment too large to be stored inside the museum, such as a blowout preventer, drill pipe, and a cementing unit.
- The Drill Floor is directly underneath the derrick and is where the work of drilling a hole is done.

== See also ==
- List of petroleum museums
