= Gas Museum =

Museum in Leicester, England

Coordinates: 52.616528°N 1.141944°W

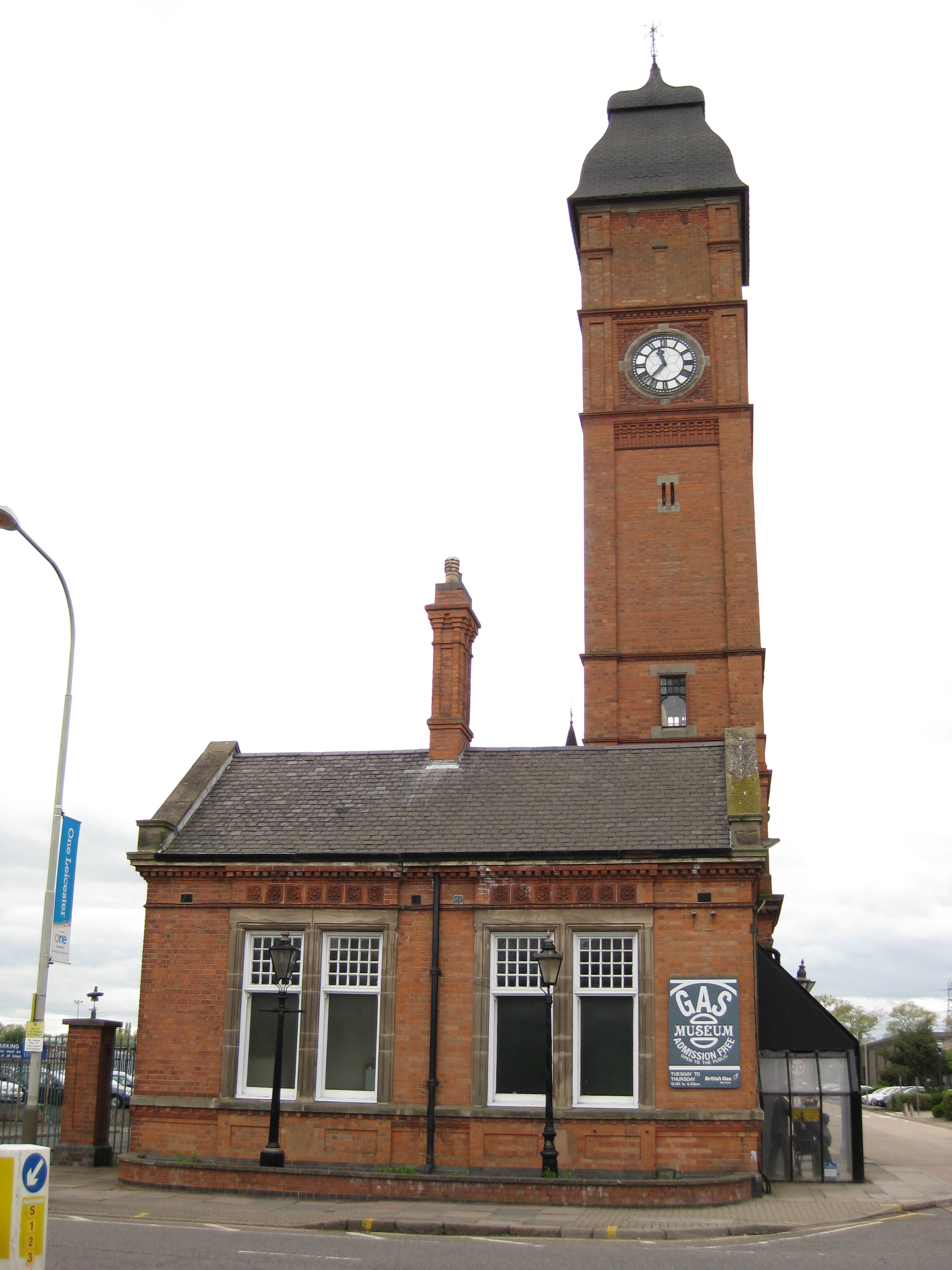
Gas Museum, Aylestone Road, Leicester LE2 7QJ

The Gas Museum, also known as the National Gas Museum, is situated in the former gatehouse of a gasworks in Leicester, England, and deals with the history of domestic and industrial gas supply. It is claimed to be "the biggest collection of gas and gas related artefacts in the world".

The building is a Grade II listed building, dating from 1878, with a clock tower. The public museum is on two floors, with over 4000 items in storage. It was opened 29 April 1977, then called the John Doran Museum. It was one of 2 museums run by the British Gas Corporation until its privatization in 1987 when it was taken over by the National Gas Museum Trust, a charity set up for the purpose. The collections of the London Gas Museum and of the South West Gas Historical Society were transferred to this site in 1998.

Displays include accounts of the history of gas usage in the UK and examples of technology. There is a tableau of 1920s kitchen with gas equipment. Domestic items include washing machines, gas irons and even a gas-powered radio. Much of the collection is of items made to operate on town gas which had to be replaced when UK gas supplies were changed over to natural gas in the 1970s, and were collected by British Gas engineers.

It is run by the National Gas Museum Trust with financial support from Centrica and National Grid plc.

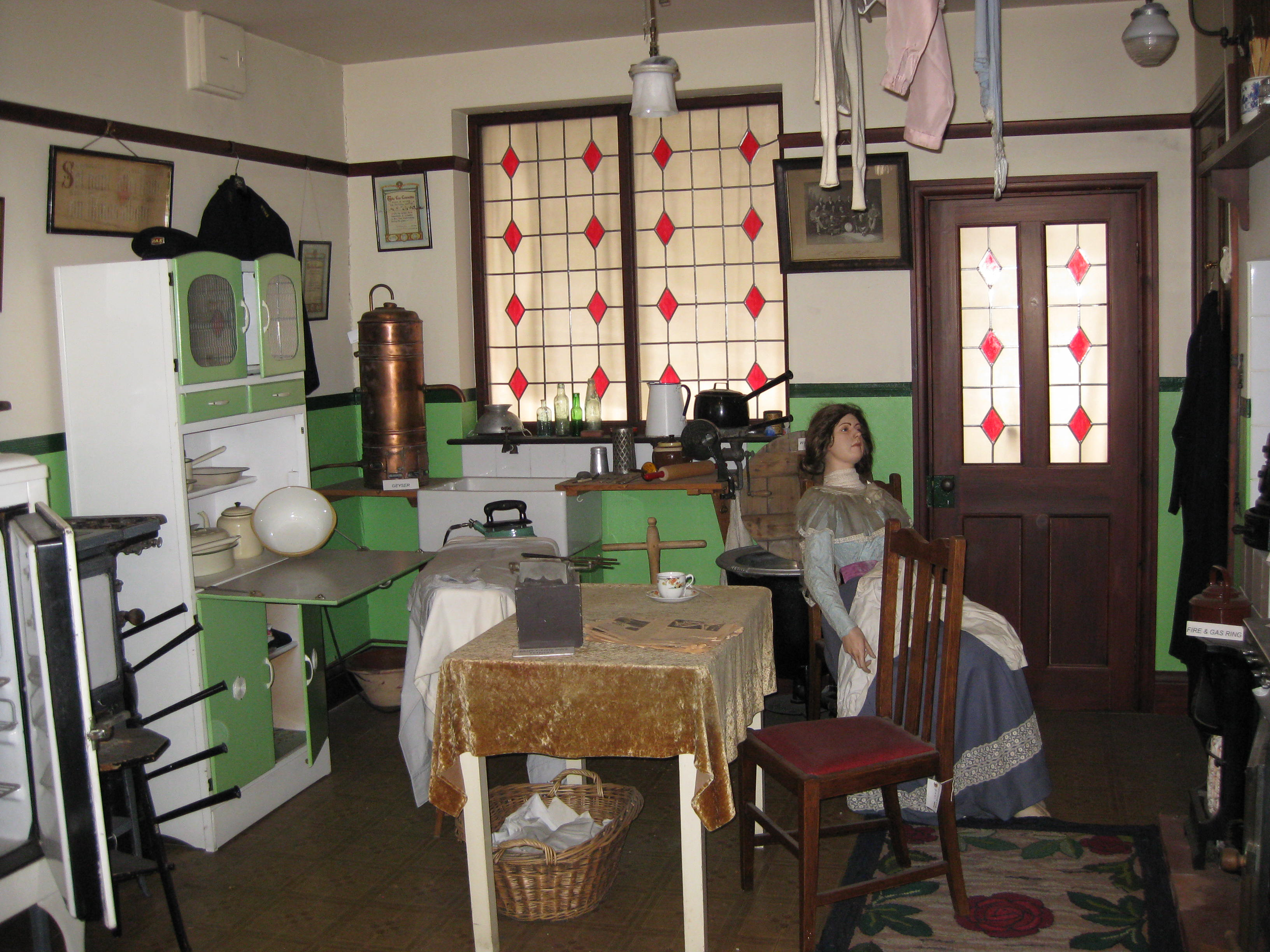
The All-Gas Kitchen, 1920s, display

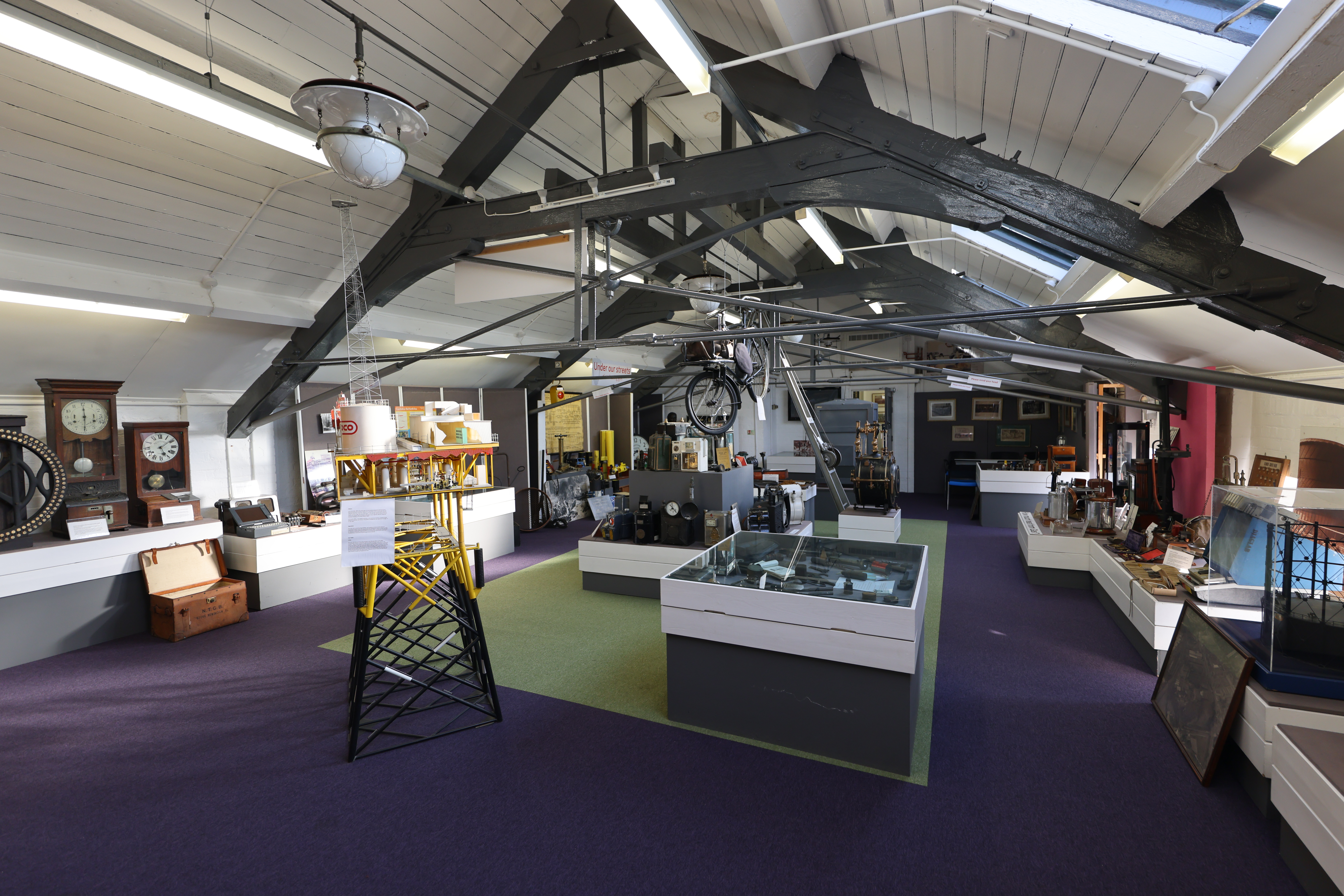
Part of the upstairs displays

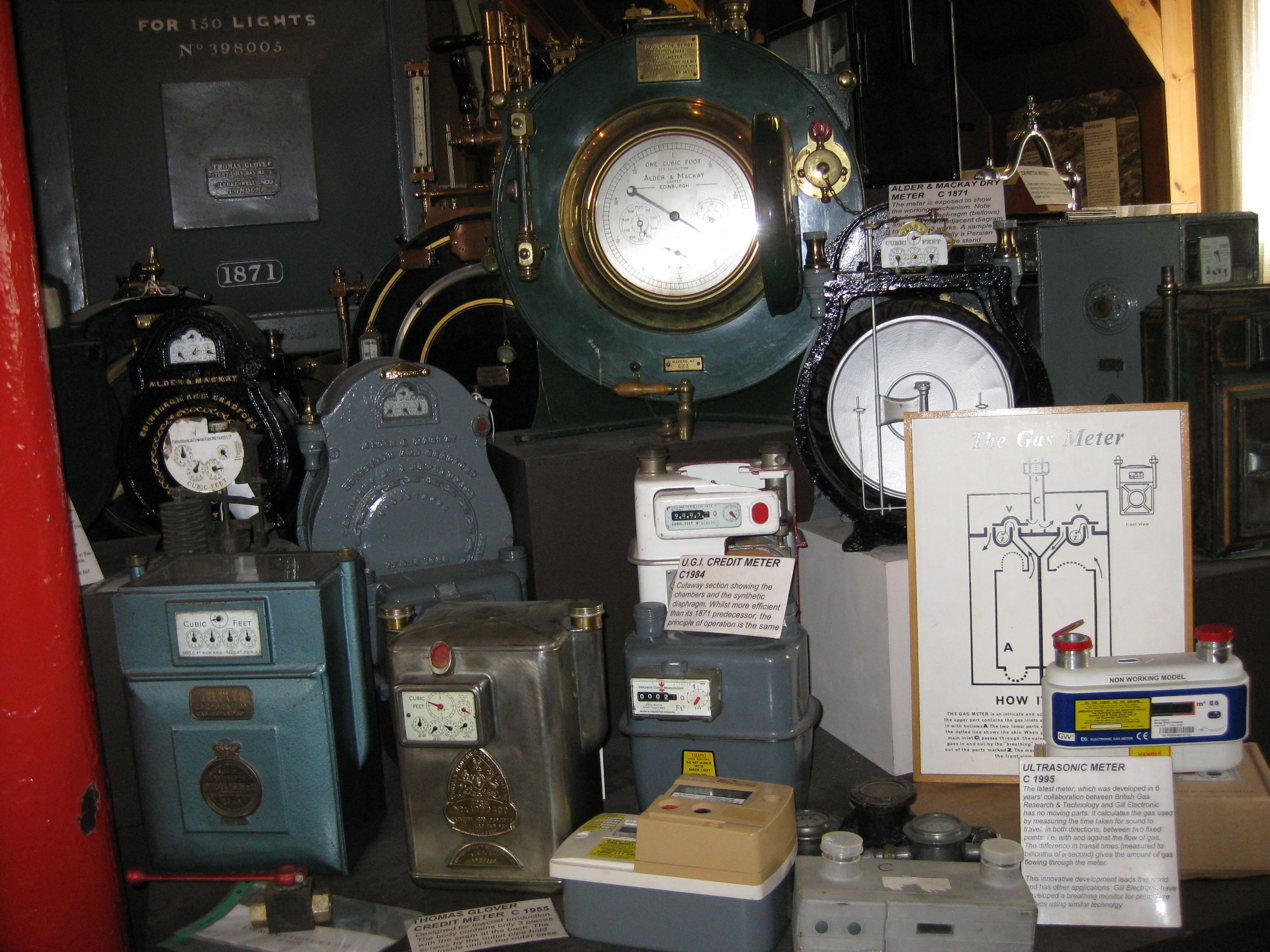
Gas meters

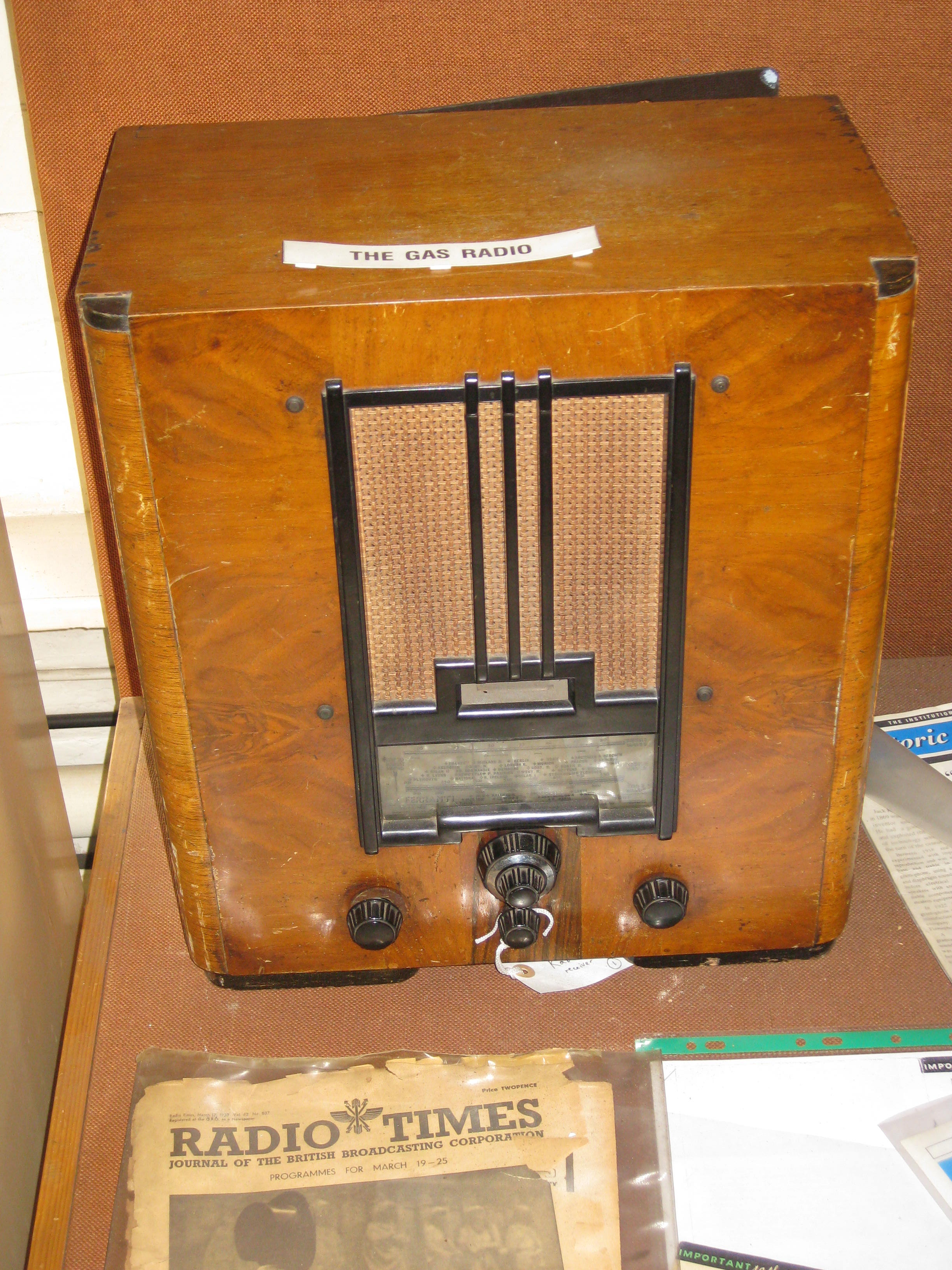
Gas-powered radio set

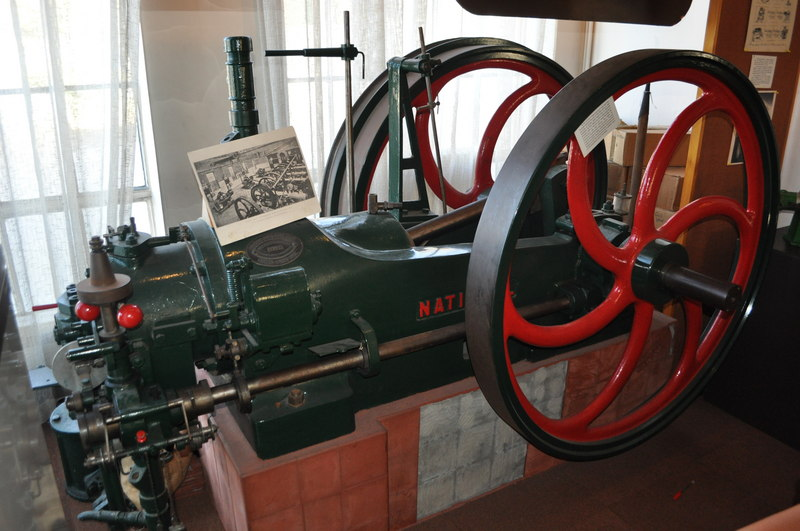
A gas engine in the museum

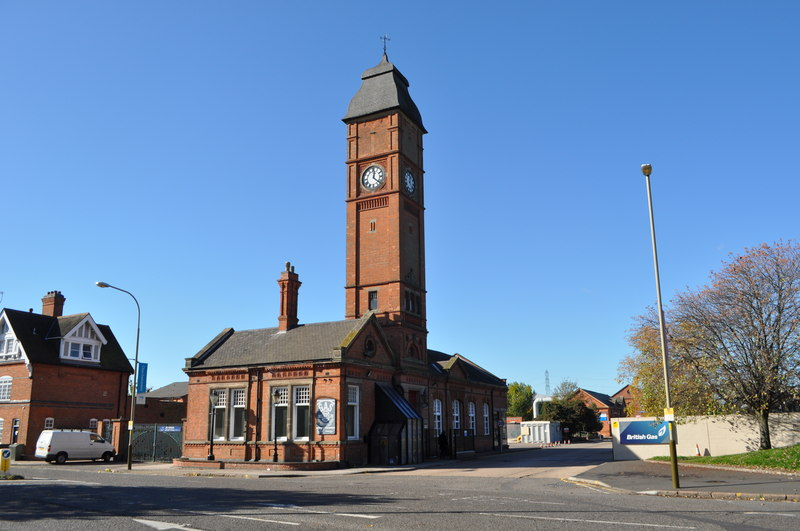

== See also ==
- List of petroleum museums
