= German Oil Museum =

Museum

Coordinates: 52°39′37″N 9°50′3″E

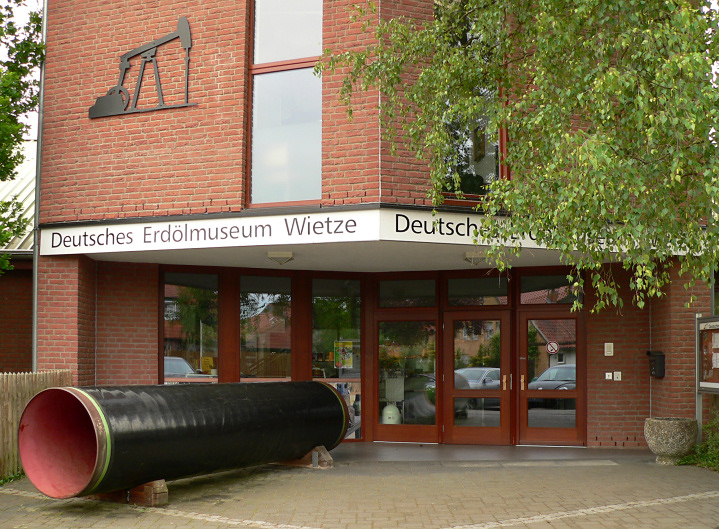
Museum entrance

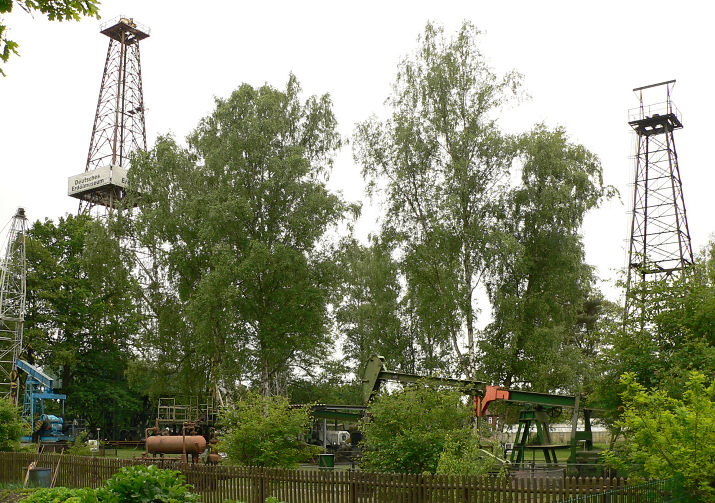
Museum site

The German Oil Museum (German: Deutsches Erdölmuseum Wietze) or German Crude Oil Museum is located in Wietze, a small village west of Celle in Lower Saxony.

== Description ==
The exhibitions in the museum's buildings use a combination of text, diagrams and models to describe the origin, occurrence, prospecting, extraction, processing and uses of crude oil. In addition, the history of crude oil extraction and use, particularly in the region around Wietze, is vividly portrayed. On a site of about 2 hectares (4.9 acres) in size, old and modern technical installations used for extraction, prospecting and refining crude oil are exhibited. Occasionally there are mining shows at which objects associated with mining, minerals and fossils may be swapped, bought or sold.

In 2015 the museum began a major reorganisation of the layout which will culminate in a completely new permanent display in 2022. This included a full refurbishment in 2020 of the Wintershall drilling rig which had been moved there in 1988. In 2021 it was announced that the museum was seeking recognition as an industrial heritage site. In the same year, the Lower Saxon State Office for the Preservation of Monuments entered the historic ensemble of oil production facilities in the museum grounds in its list of cultural monuments. These include four wooden winding towers and their accessories, a transport pump, measuring vessels and an oil tank. The reason for the protection was the importance of the equipment in the economic history of the oil industry in Germany.

The museum is a founding member of the network of European Oil Museums. and member of the European Route of Industrial Heritage (ERIH).

== Wietze and crude oil ==
The village of Wietze has played a special role in the history of crude oil extraction. As early as the 17th century, crude oil from mineral deposits at Wietze was scooped from tar pits on the surface and used as a grease and medicament. In 1858 one of the first boreholes in the world for the extraction of oil was sunk here. From 1920 to 1963 oil was also extracted from underground mines.

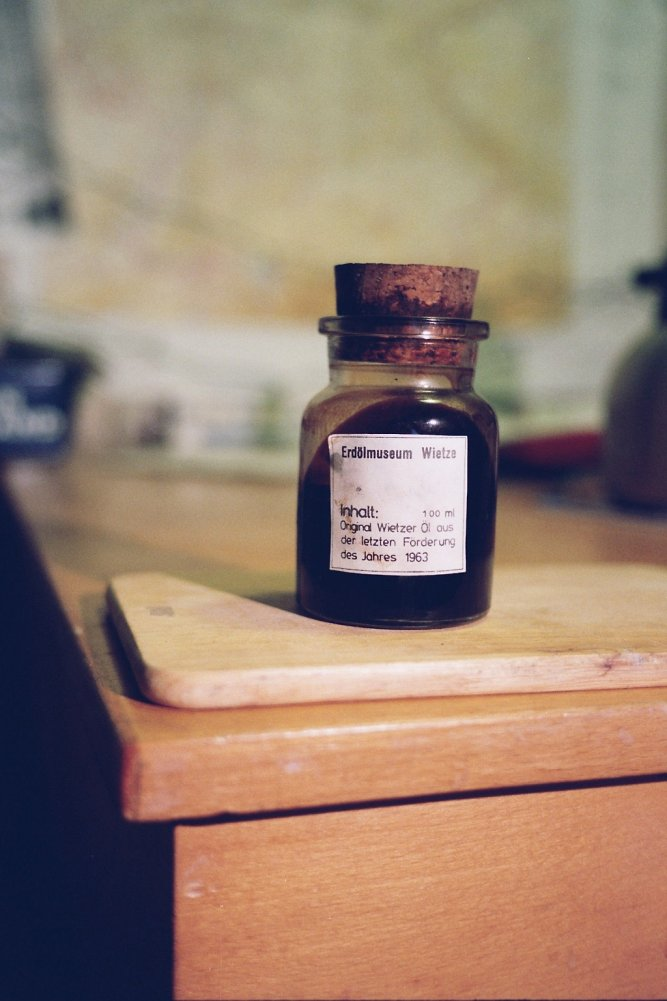
Oil from Wietze

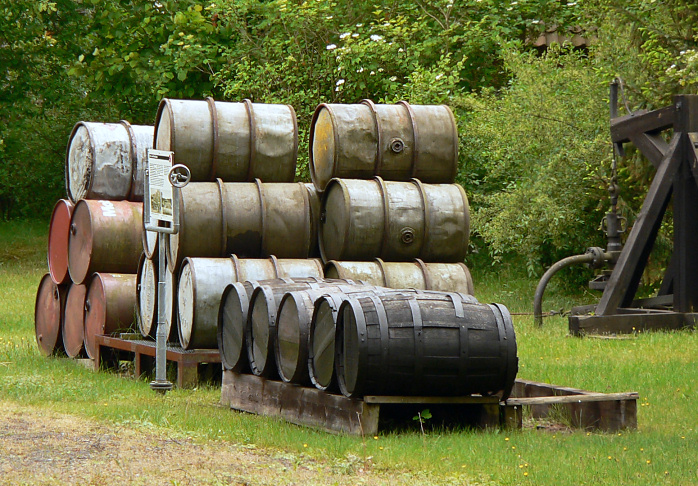
Oil barrels from different eras

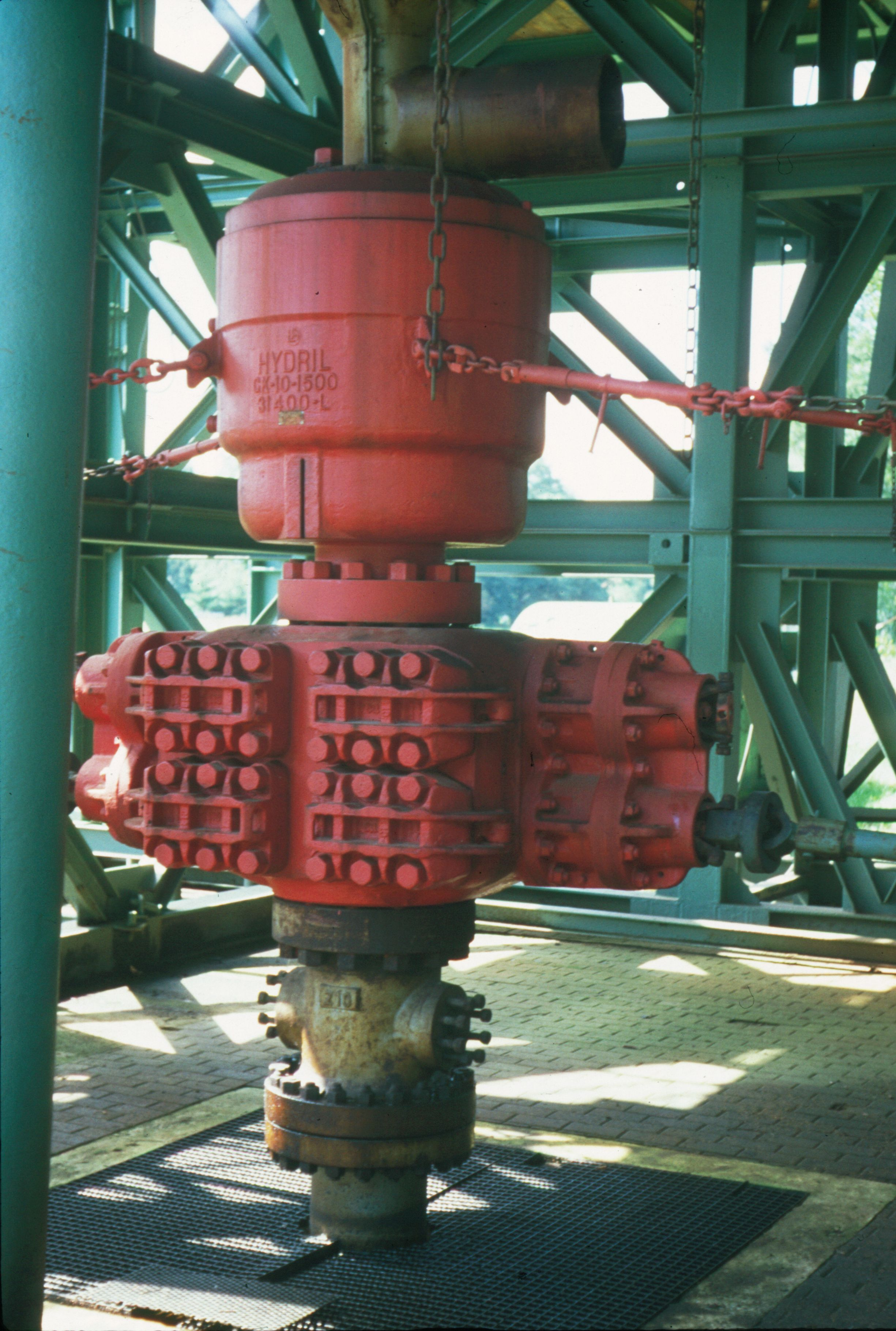
Blowout preventer on an oil drilling tower

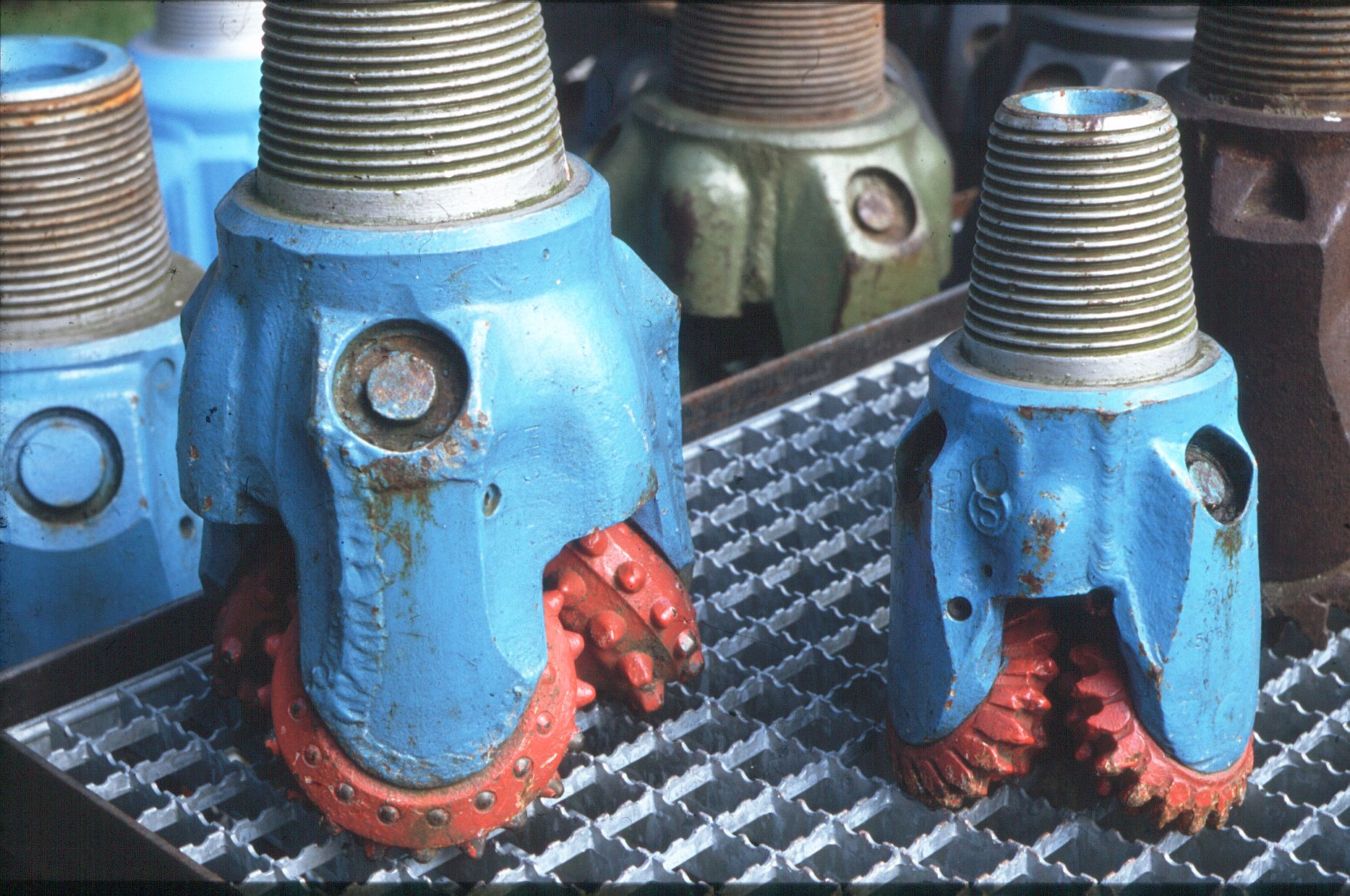
Drilling bit

== See also ==
- List of petroleum museums
