= Fisogni Museum =

Museum in Italy

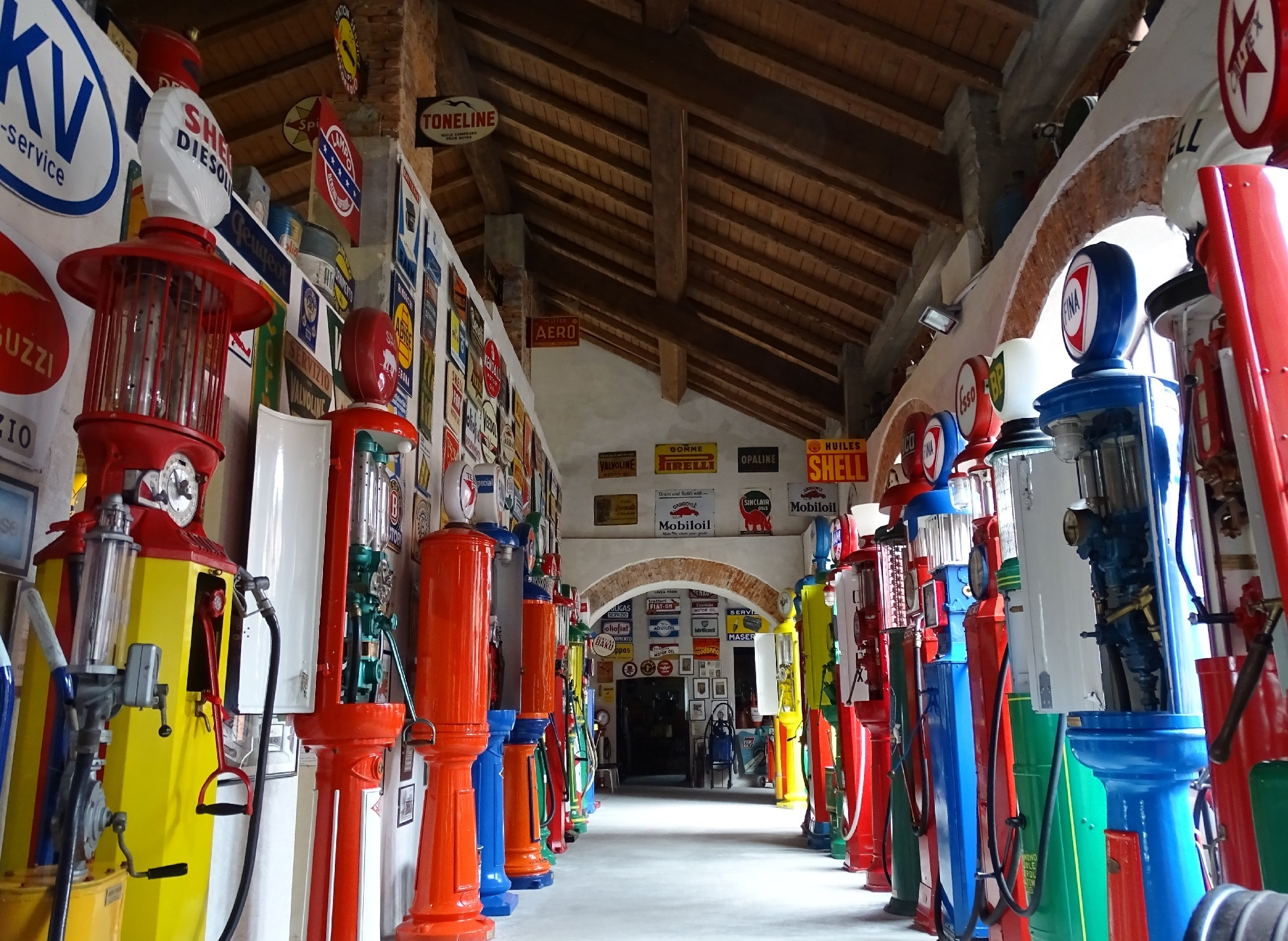
- Established: 1966; 60 years ago
- Location: Tradate (Varese), Italy
- Coordinates: 45°42′47″N 8°54′05″E
- Collection size: approx. 8.000 objects
- Founder: Guido Fisogni
- Website: www.museo-fisogni.org

The Fisogni Museum of the petrol station (in the past also SIRM Museum or Ormad Valseveso Museum), in Tradate, Italy, is a museum about gas pumps, gas stations and petroliana, founded by Guido Fisogni in 1966.

With its 8000 pieces, between gas pumps, signs and gadgets, the collection is the biggest in the world in its genre, certified by Guinness World Records in 2000. The Museum is also part of the "Lombard Circuit of Design Museum" and of the "Italian Design Network" by Triennale di Milano.

== History ==
The Museum was founded in 1966 in Palazzolo Milanese (Paderno Dugnano). The entrepreneur Guido Fisogni, son of Alpini General and nobleman Federico Fisogni and of countess Elisabetta Barbiano di Belgioioso, had a society that built gas stations in Italy and Europe, and in 1961 decided to collect old gas pumps and related objects, starting from an old Italian fuel pump by Bergomi, from the 1920s. From 1966 to 2000 the collection, example of Modern antique and industrial archeology, was enlarged with globes, gadgets, tools, graphics, toys and documents from different countries. The Museum now hosts more than 180 fuel dispensers (from 1892 to 2001) anche more than 8.000 objects.

In 1994 the Museum assumed its present name.

When Guido Fisogni sold his company, in 2000, the Museum remained closed for 15 years, before re-opening in 2015 in Tradate, in the ancient buildings of "Villa Castiglioni", previously home of Cesare Castiglioni, nobleman, soldier of Giuseppe Garibaldi and entrepreneur.

The collection of the museum includes many vintage graphics by important designers and illustrators (like Plinio Codognato or Lora Lamm) and among the most important pieces there are a gas pump designed by Marcello Nizzoli for Agip in 1960 and Benito Mussolini's private fuel pump, probably designed by Marcello Piacentini. The historical location is also used for private and corporate events, exhibitions and cultural events.

== Bergomi archive ==
The Museum preserves also part of the historical archive of Società Anonima Bergomi, an Italian company existed from 1906 to 1993, which built gas pumps in the 20th century, with ancient projects and photos from 1909 to the 1950s.

== Villa Castiglioni ==
The manor, belonging to Pusterla family, was bought by the Castiglionis in 1781, and then enlarged during the 19th century, mainly thanks to Cesare Castiglioni. The courtyard where the Museum is exposed dates back to 1840, while the residential area, in neo-Gothic style, assumed this shape around 1875 . The courtyard was abandoned until 2015, when it was restored to house the museum.

== Gallery ==
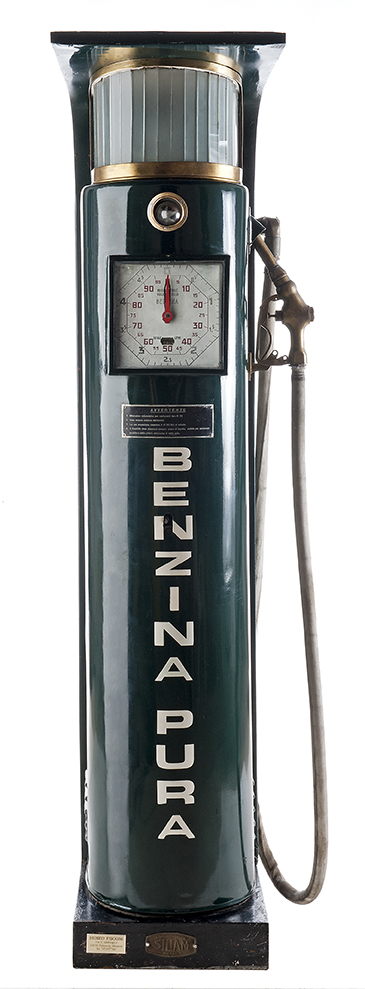
Benito Mussolini's gas pump

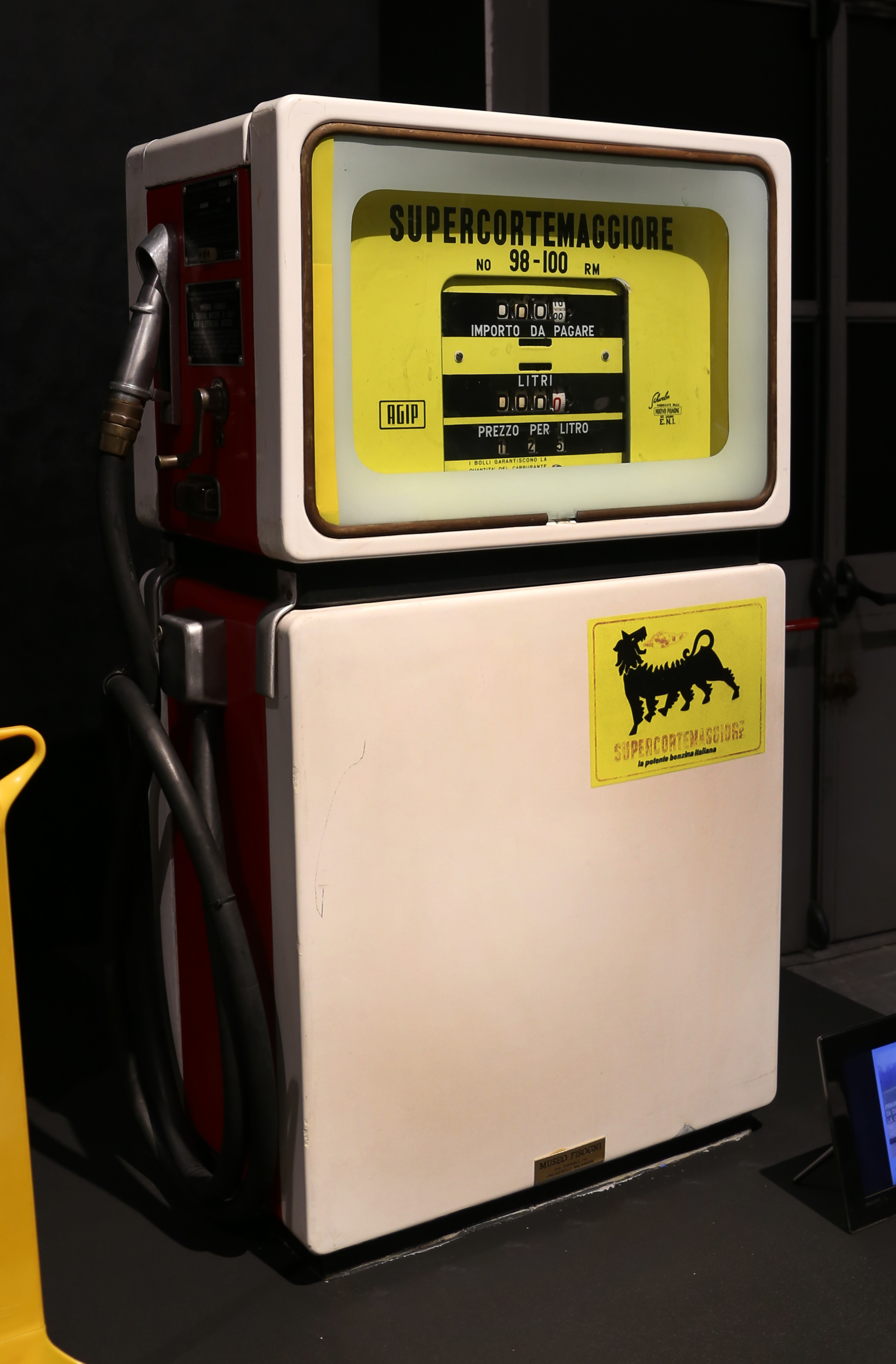
Marcello Nizzoli's gas pump

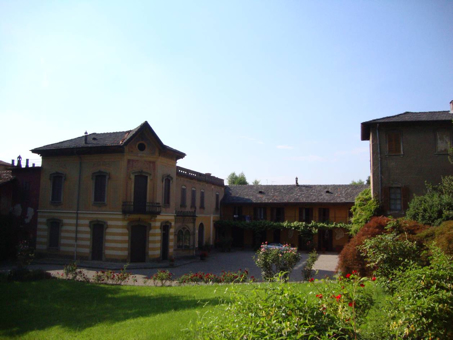
Villa Castiglioni

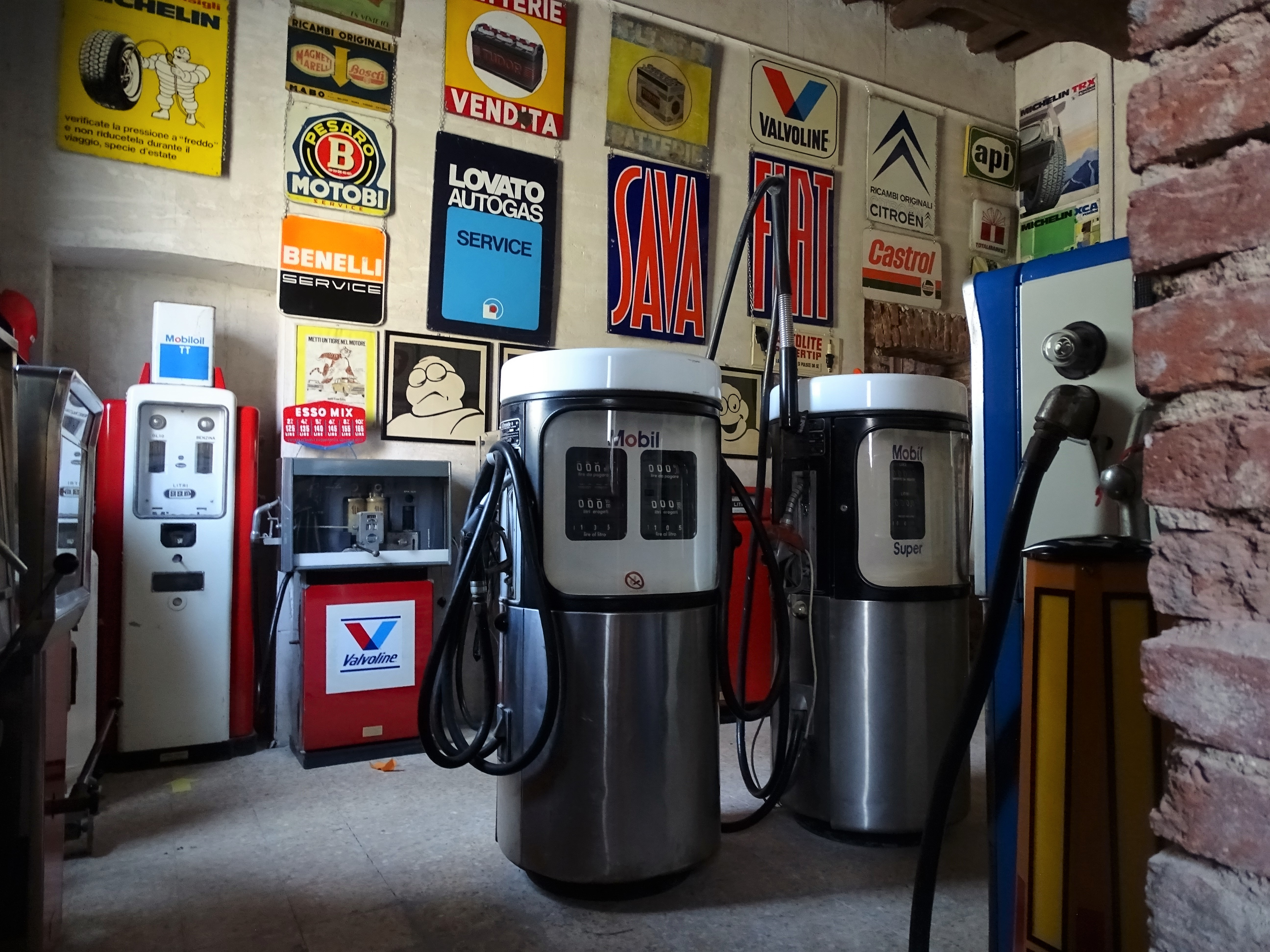
1970s gas pumps

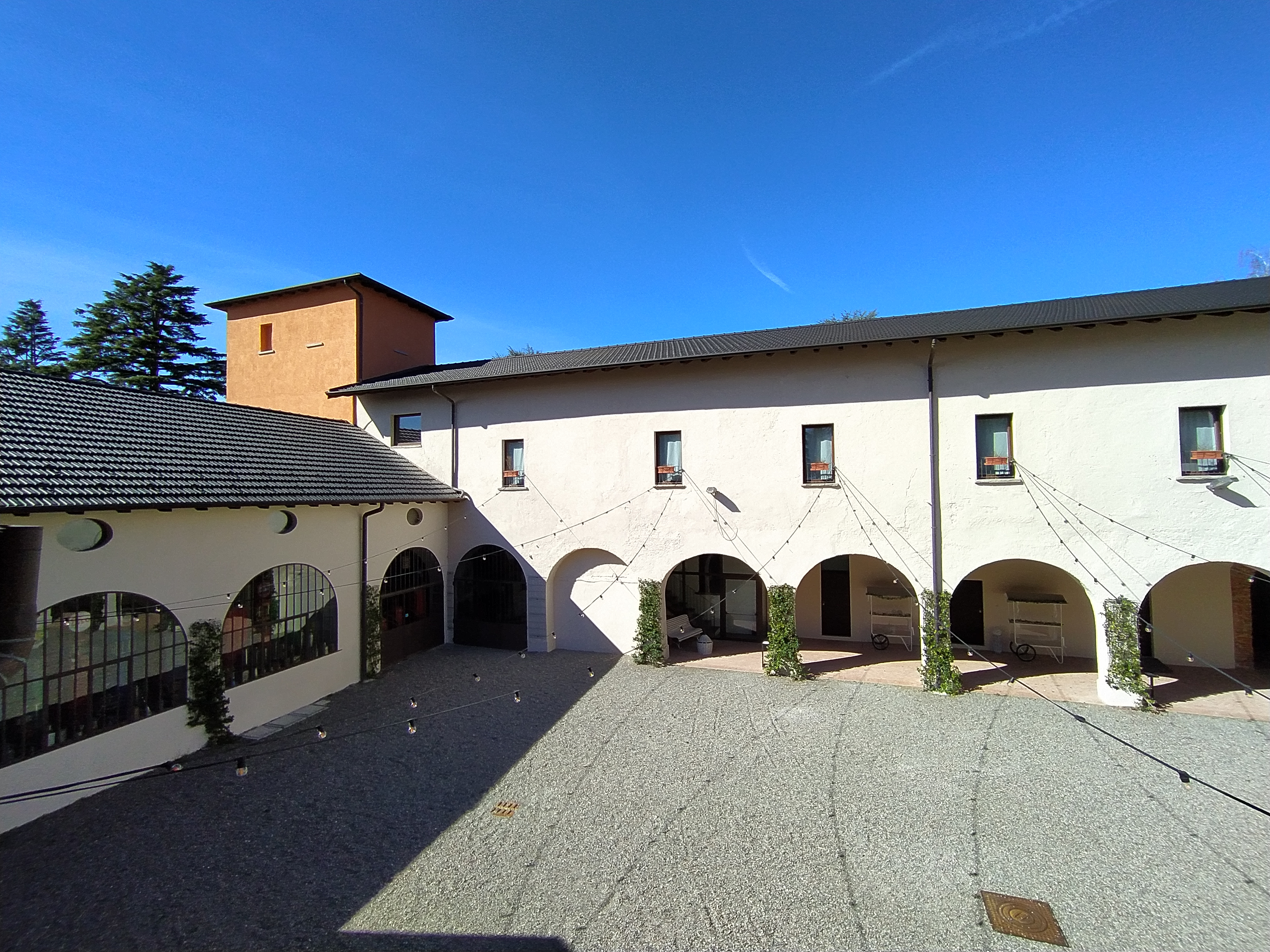
The 1840 courtyard

== See also ==
- List of petroleum and gas museums
