= Union Oil Company Building =

- Santa Paula Hardware Company Block—Union Oil Company
- U.S. National Register of Historic Places
- California Historical Landmark
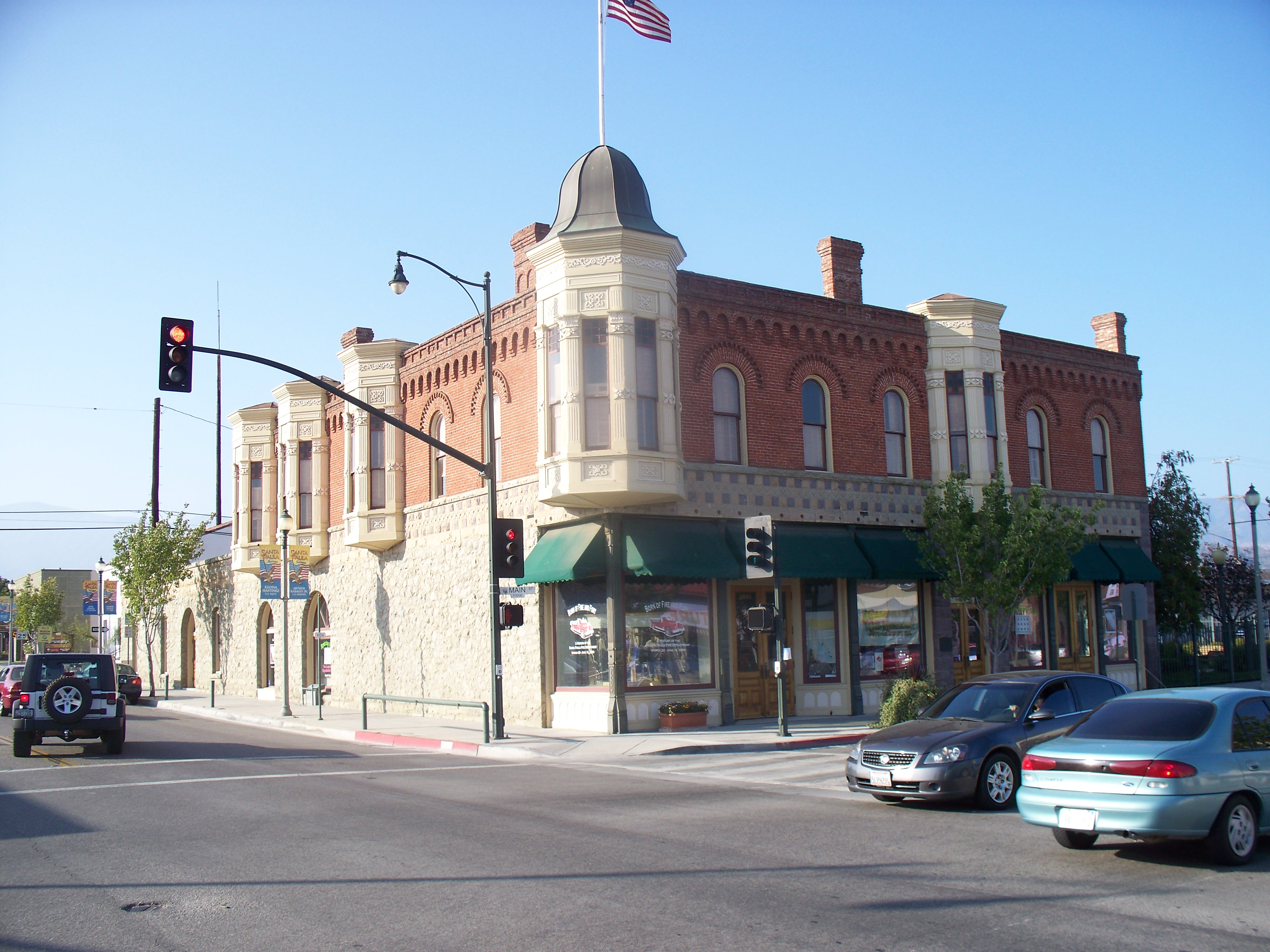

- Location within California Location within the United States
- Location: 1003 E. Main St. Santa Paula, California
- Coordinates: 34°21′15″N 119°3′32″W
- Area: 0.2 acres (0.081 ha)
- Built: 1889
- Architect: Burrows, C.W.
- Architectural style: Queen Anne style with Italianate influences
- NRHP reference No.: 86002619
- CHISL No.: 996

Significant dates
- Added to NRHP: August 14, 1986
- Designated CHISL: 1991

The Santa Paula Hardware Company Building, located in Santa Paula, California, and more commonly referred to as the Union Oil Company Building, is significant for its historical importance as the birthplace of the Union Oil Company on October 17, 1890. Originally, the Santa Paula Hardware and Post Office were downstairs, and the Union Oil Company offices were upstairs. The building continued to serve as a field division office after the main headquarters moved to Los Angeles in 1900.

The Ventura County Cultural Heritage Board designated the building County Landmark #36 in December 1977. The building is a California Historical Landmark (#996) and is listed on the National Register of Historic Places (NPS-86002619).

== California Oil Museum ==
In 1950, the Union Oil Museum was established, and in 1990, for its Centennial Celebration, the building was restored to its original appearance and reopened as the California Oil Museum. The exhibits include oil and gas industry equipment, such as an 1890s iron and timber operating drilling rig, historic gas pumps and product containers, a recreated 1890s period Union Oil Company corporate headquarters office, and a 1930s period apartment. The building and artifacts were donated to the city of Santa Paula through an agreement with Chevron Corporation in 2024 that included a $2 million grant to maintain and preserve the structure.

== See also ==
- Los Angeles Center Studios, formerly the Union Oil Center
- List of petroleum museums
- List of Registered Historic Places in Ventura County, California
- Ventura County Historic Landmarks & Points of Interest
