= List of petroleum and gas museums =

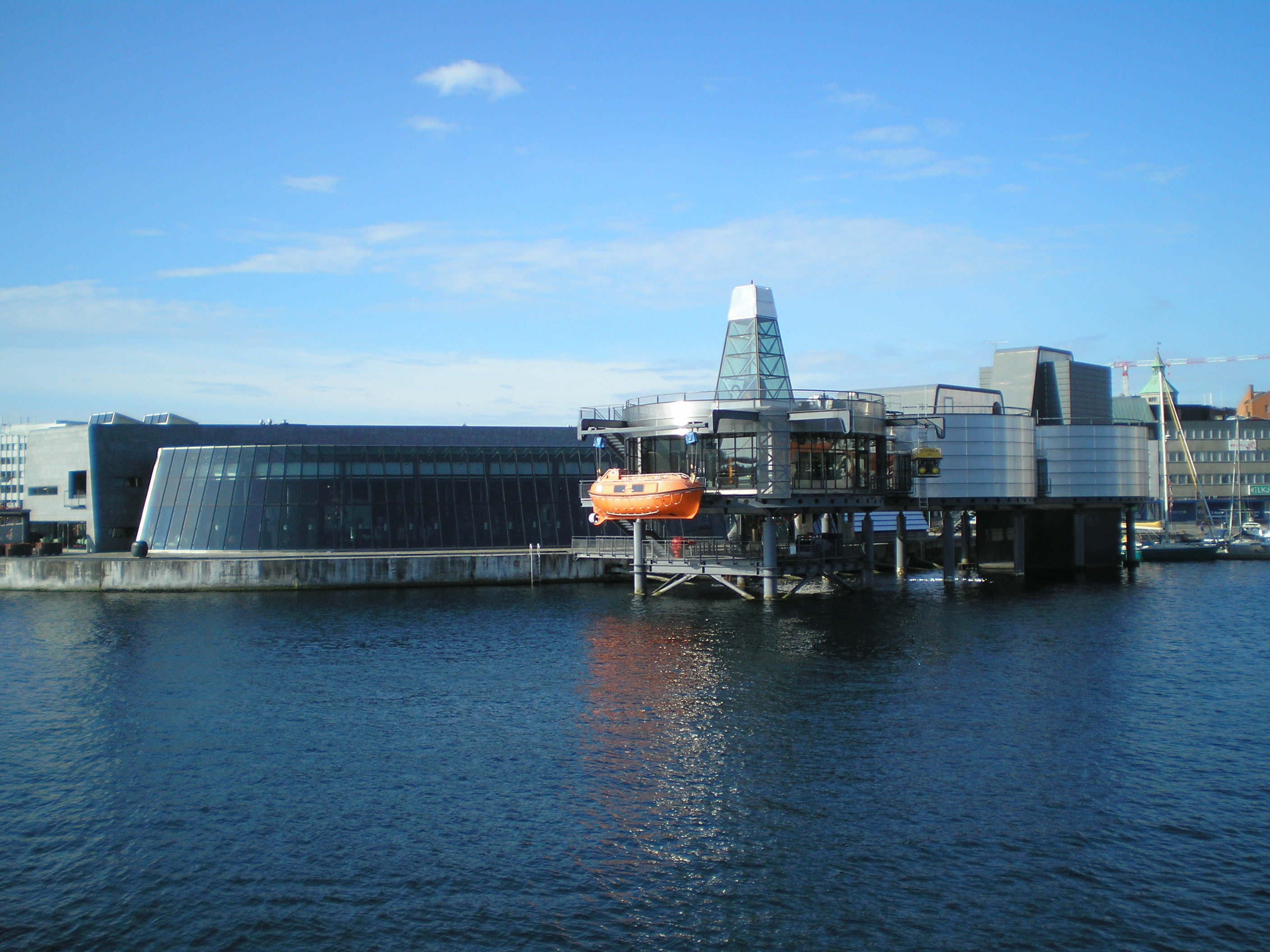
The Norwegian Petroleum Museum is a civic landmark in Stavanger, Norway. This museum focuses mainly on petroleum exploration and production in the North Sea.

This is a list of petroleum, gas, and related museums around the world.

== Asia ==
- Oman Oil and Gas Exhibition Centre, Al-Qurum
- Petroleum Museum, Malaysia
- Taiwan Oil Field Exhibition Hall, Taiwan
- KOC Ahmed Al Jaber Oil and Gas Exhibition, Kuwait
- Digboi Oil Centenary Museum, Digboi, Assam, India
- Petroleum Museums And Documents Center, Tehran, Iran

== Europe ==
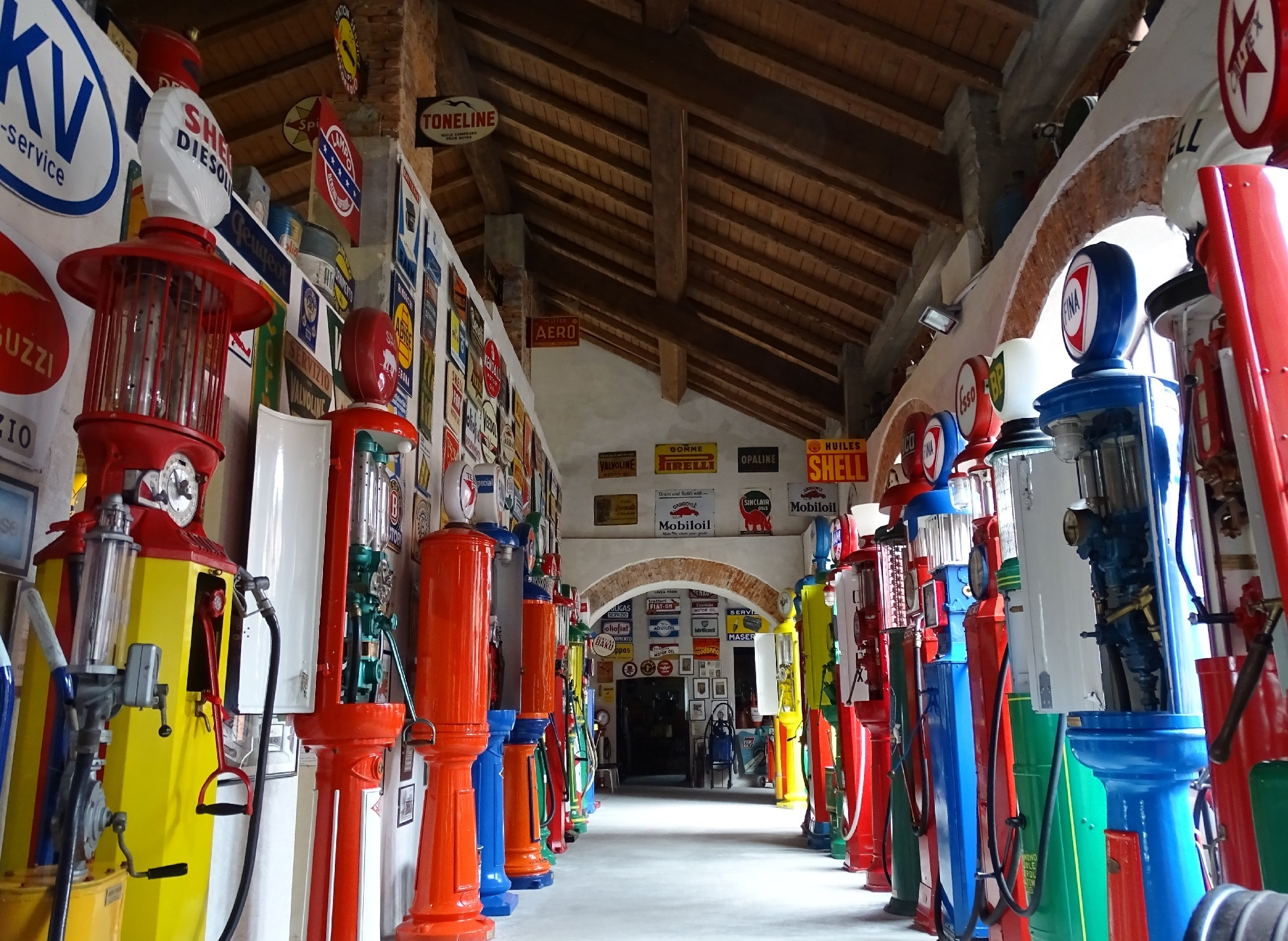
A photo of Museo Fisogni, in Italy. It's the largest collection in the world, certified by Guinness World Record

- Erdöl-Erdgas-Museum Twist, Twist, Germany
- Erdölmuseum Osterwald, Osterwald, Germany
- German Oil Museum, Lower Saxony, Germany
- Muzeul Național al Petrolului, Ploiesti, Romania
- Musée du pétrole de Merkwiller-Pechelbronn, Merkwiller-Pechelbronn, France
- Norwegian Petroleum Museum, Stavanger, Norway
- Engelsbergs Oljefabrik, Ängelsberg, Sweden
- Technopolis (Gazi), Athens, Greece
- GASmuseet, The Danish GAS Museum, Hobro, Denmark
- Ignacy Łukasiewicz Oil and Gas Industry Museum, Bobrka, Poland
- Warsaw Gasworks Museum, Warsaw, Poland
- Project Parco Museo del Petrolio Vallezza, Fornovo di Taro (Parma), Italy
- Fisogni Museum, Tradate (Varese), Italy (largest gas pumps and petroliana collection, certified by Guinness World Records)
- Museum of Oil Mining and geology, Hodonín, Czech republic
- Magyar Olajipari Múzeum, Zalaegerszeg, Hungary

=== United Kingdom ===
- Dukes Wood Oil Museum, Nottinghamshire
- Flame: the Gasworks Museum of Ireland (formerly Carrickfergus Gas Works Museum), Belfast
- Museum of the Scottish Shale Oil Industry, Livingston
- National Gas Museum, Leicester

== North America ==
=== Canada ===
- Leduc #1 Energy Discovery Centre, Leduc, Alberta
- Cold Lake Museums, Cold Lake, Alberta
- Oil Museum of Canada, Oil Springs, Ontario; situated within the First Commercial Oil Fields National Historic Site of Canada

=== United States ===
California

- Antique Gas and Steam Engine Museum, Vista, California
- West Kern Oil Museum, Taft, California
- Olinda Oil Museum & Trail, Brea, California
- Hathaway Ranch Museum, Santa Fe Springs, California
- California Oil Museum, Santa Paula, California

Louisiana

- International Petroleum Museum, Morgan City, Louisiana
- Louisiana State Oil and Gas Museum, Oil City

Oklahoma

- Healdton Oil Museum, Healdton, Oklahoma
- Phillips 66 Museum, Bartlesville, Oklahoma

Pennsylvania

- Drake Well Museum, Titusville, Pennsylvania
- Penn-Brad Oil Museum, Bradford, PA
- Pithole Museum, Pleasantville, Pennsylvania

Texas

- Central Texas Oil Patch Museum, Luling, Texas
- East Texas Oil Museum, Kilgore, Texas
- Ocean Star Offshore Drilling Rig & Museum, Galveston, Texas
- Permian Basin Petroleum Museum, Midland, Texas
- Spindletop-Gladys City Boomtown Museum, Beaumont, Texas
- Texas Energy Museum, Beaumont, Texas

Other states

- Arkansas Museum of Natural Resources, Smackover, Arkansas
- Northwoods Petroleum Museum, Three Lakes, Wisconsin
- Past Gas & Ancient Oils Museum, Sumner, Maine
- Oil and Gas Museum, Parkersburg, West Virginia
- General Petroleum Museum, Seattle, Washington (1980s-2003)
- Kansas Oil Museum, El Dorado, Kansas

== Oceania ==
- Dunedin Gasworks Museum, Dunedin, New Zealand
- Gasworks, Brisbane, Australia

== South America ==
- Museo Nacional del Petróleo, Comodoro Rivadavia, Chubut, Argentina
- Museo del Petróleo Samuel Schneider Uribe, Barrancabermeja, Santander, Colombia

== Other ==
- National Gas Museum Trust, a United Kingdom charitable trust.

== Former Museums ==
- London Gas Museum, UK, definitely closed
- General Petroleum Museum, Seattle, Washington, USA, definitely closed. It is considered the first solely petroliana museum
