= National Gas Museum Trust =

United Kingdom charitable trust

The National Gas Museum Trust is a United Kingdom charitable trust, established in 1997 to take over the responsibility for the UK's two former gas museums.

== Formations and objectives ==
Originally incorporated on the 16 July 1997 as a private company limited by guarantee (Company Number 3404062), its two prime objectives as set out in its Memorandum and Articles of Association are:

- 1. To ensure that the artefacts held by the Museum at Bromley-by-Bow, London, (now closed), and held by the John Doran Gas Museum, Leicester, are preserved for future generations
- 2. To establish a ‘living collection’ by providing a mechanism that would ensure gas artefacts from the present and future are collected, maintained and displayed

It has the standard Charitable Trust powers, enabling the Trust to:

- Raise funds and invite and receive contributions
- Acquire, alter, improve and to charge or otherwise dispose of property
- Employ staff
- Establish or support any charitable trusts, associations or institutions formed for all or any of the Objects
- Co-operate with other charities, voluntary bodies and statutory authorities operating in furtherance of the Objects or similar charitable

Sir Denis Rooke former Chairman of British Gas was a trustee until his death on 2 September 2008.

== Collection ==
After closure of the London museum, the entire collection was moved to the Gas Museum in Aylestone Road, Leicester. Some of collection is now on display there, and after a grant from the Heritage Lottery Fund, the entire collection has been catalogued.

== References and notes ==
- "Far from the sodding crowd" Robin Halstead et al., Penguin ISBN 978-0-7181-4966-6
