= Wietze =

Municipality in Celle district, Lower Saxony, Germany

- Municipality
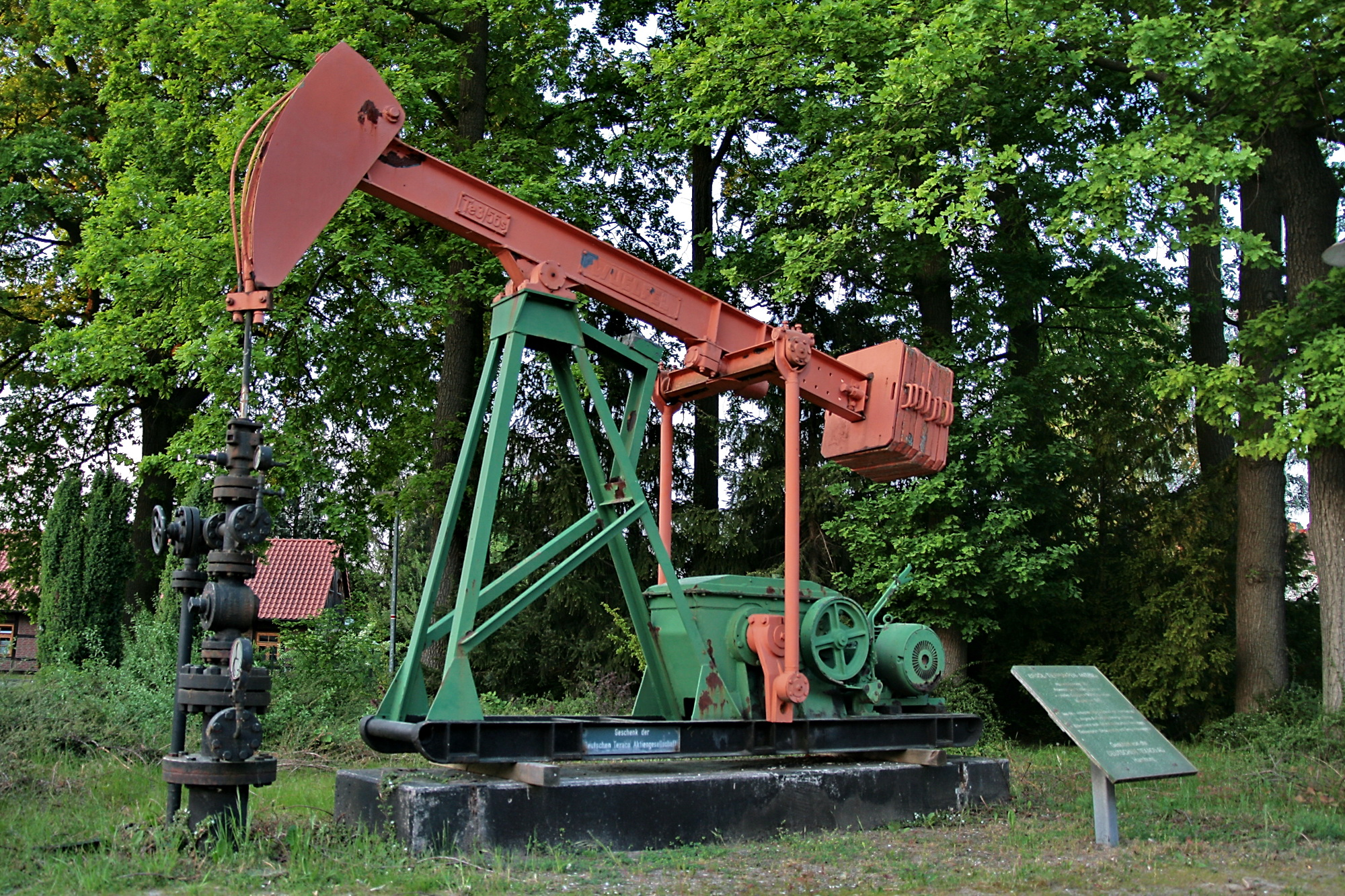
- A pumpjack at the German Oil Museum

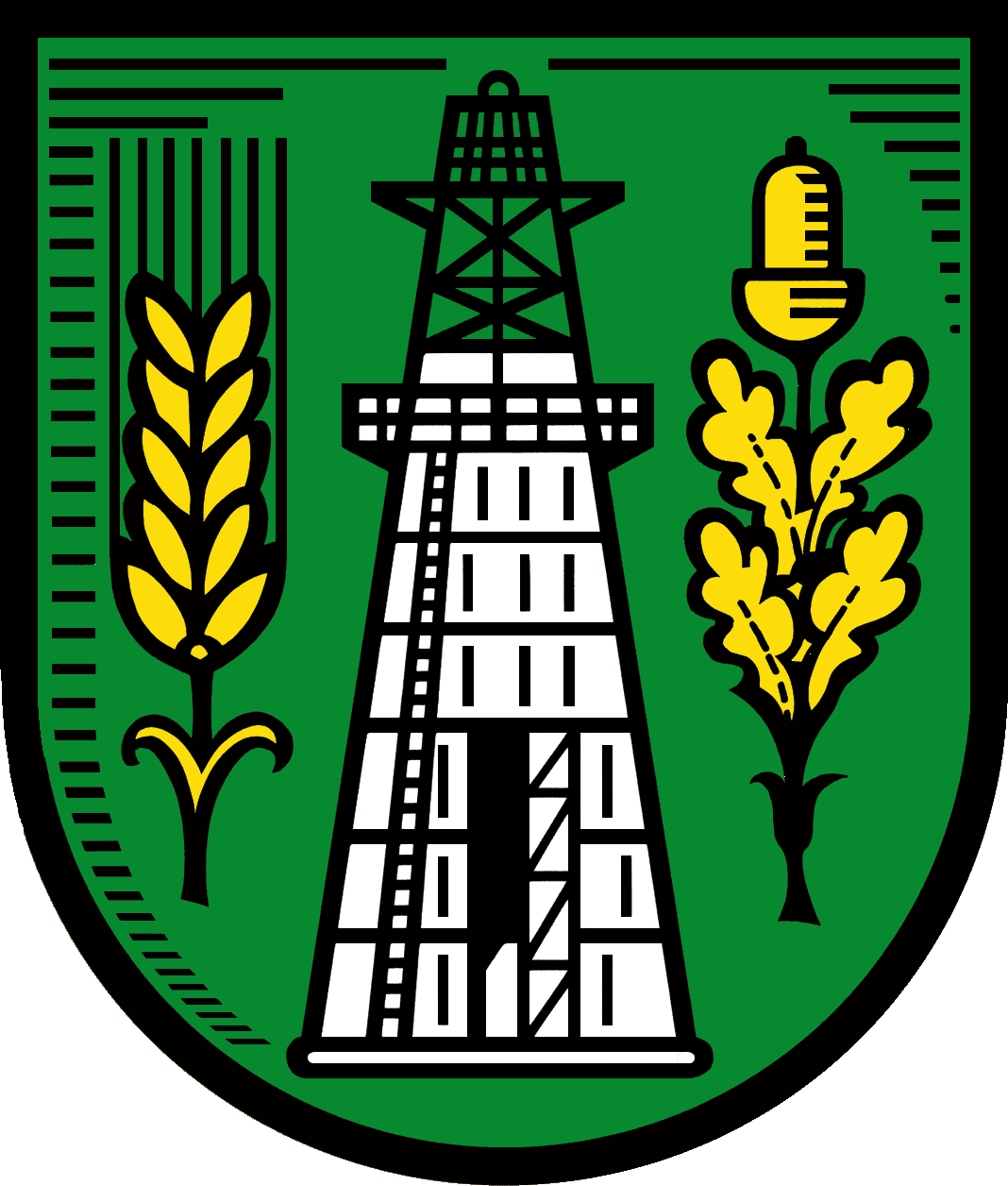
- Coat of arms

- Location of Wietze within Celle district
- Interactive map of Wietze
- Location within Germany Location within Lower Saxony
- Coordinates: 52°39′N 09°50′E
- Country: Germany
- State: Lower Saxony
- District: Celle

Government
  - Mayor (2019–24): Wolfgang Klußmann (CDU)

Area
  - Total: 63.26 km^{2} (24.42 sq mi)
- Elevation: 32 m (105 ft)

Population (2025-12-31)
  - Total: 7,363
  - Density: 116.4/km^{2} (301.5/sq mi)
- Time zone: UTC+01:00 (CET)
  - Summer (DST): UTC+02:00 (CEST)
- Postal codes: 29323
- Dialling codes: 05146
- Vehicle registration: CE
- Website: www.wietze.de

Wietze (German pronunciation: [ˈviːtsə]) is a municipality in the district of Celle, in Lower Saxony, Germany. It lies at the confluence of the Aller River and its tributary, the Wietze, approximately 15 kilometers (9.3 mi) west of Celle. It is the site of the German Oil Museum.
