= London Gas Museum =

Former museum in Bromley-by-Bow, London

Coordinates: 51°31′20″N 0°0′18″W

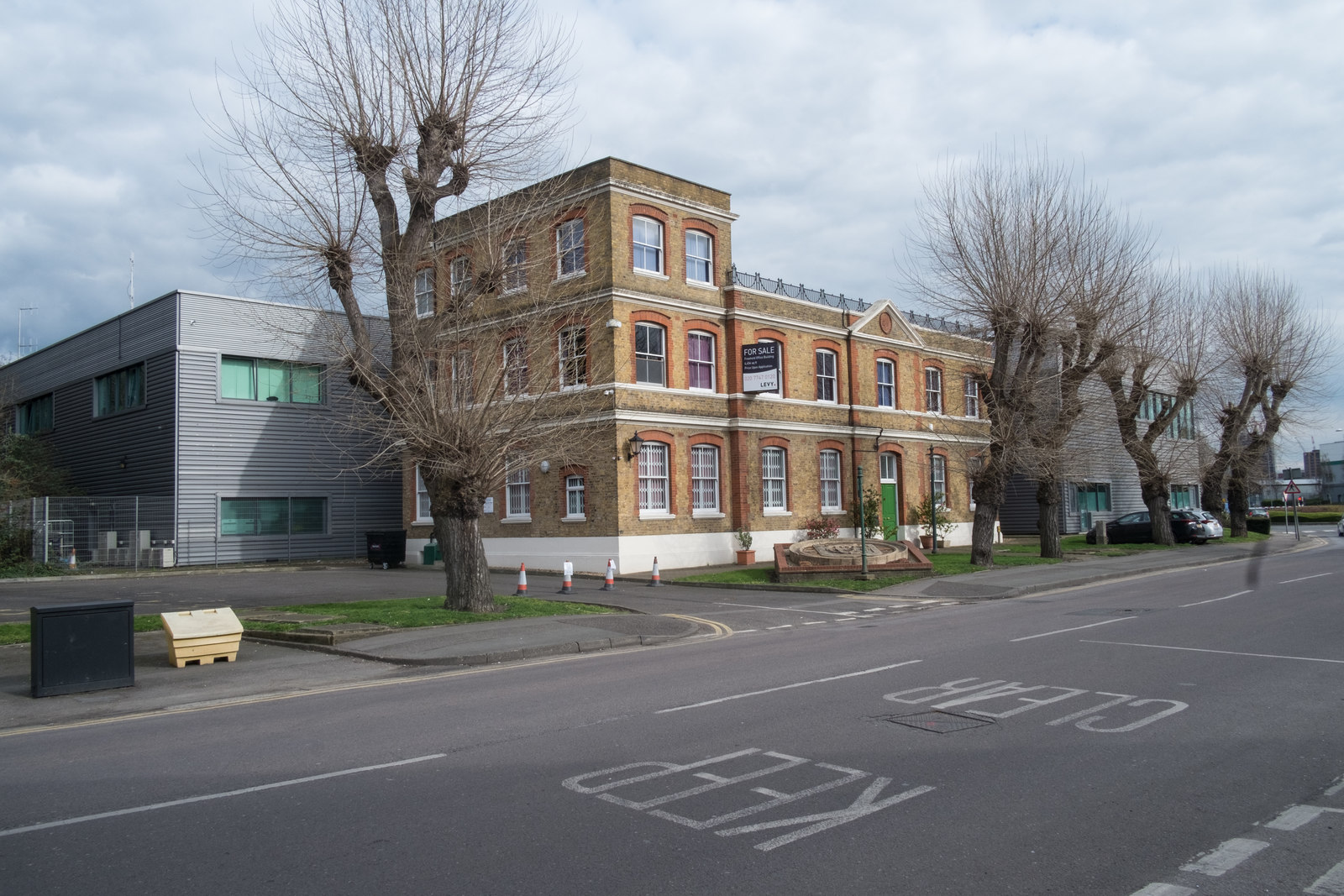
The museum building in 2018

The London Gas Museum was a museum in West Ham in east London, England.

It was situated on Twelvetrees Crescent, in the London Borough of Newham, on the eastern side of the River Lea and near to Bromley-by-Bow tube station. The building dates from 1905 when it was part of a gas works and is still known as the London Gas Museum for post. Amongst other exhibits, it held a gas-powered radio, and an assortment of survey maps for gas companies.

== Closure ==
In 1998, the museum started preparing to close, and distributed its collections to various entities. The former contents were merged with the collection in the Leicester Gas Museum.

The building is now occupied by offices.
