= Findley =

Findley may refer to:

- Findley (surname)
- Findley Burns Jr. (1917–2003), American diplomat
- Findley Lake (disambiguation)
- Findley payments
- Findley Township, Mercer County, Pennsylvania
- Lake Findley
- Mrs. Findley Braden, pen name of Anna Braden (1858–1939)

== See also ==
- Findlay (disambiguation)
- Finlay (disambiguation)
