= Findley (surname) =

Findley is a surname of Irish and Scottish origin. Spellings include, but are not limited to, Findley, Findlay, Finley, and Finlay. The name is an Anglicized form of the Old Gaelic name Fionnlagh or Fionnlugh which is composed of the elements fionn and lagh: fionn means fair, fair complected or beautiful; lagh from laogh means hero. It has its root in the old Celtic deity Lugh (Lugus).

People with the surname include:

- Chuck Findley (born 1947), American session musician
- Craig J. Findley (born 1948), American newspaper editor, photographer, and politician
- Edward Findley (1864–1947), Australian politician
- Edwina Findley (born 1980), American actress
- Ferguson Findley (1910–1963), American novelist
- Gbehzohngar Milton Findley (born 1960), Liberian government official
- Kelly Findley (born 1970), American soccer coach
- Lynn Findley (born 1952), American politician
- Nigel Findley (1959–1995), game designer and science fiction novelist
- Paul Findley (1921–2019), American politician
- Rick Findley (born 1950), Canadian air force commander
- Robbie Findley (born 1985), American soccer player
- Rowe Findley (1925–2003), American journalist
- Timothy Findley (1930–2002), Canadian novelist
- Trent Findley (born 1980), American football player
- Troy Findley (born 1964), American politician from Kansas
- William Findley (1741–1821), American politician

== See also ==
- Lake Findley
- Fendley
- Findley Lake, New York
