= Feneley =

Feneley is a surname. Notable people with the surname include:

- Dustin Feneley (born 1982), Australian film director and screenwriter
- Jack Feneley (1858–1944), Australian businessman
- Michael Feneley, Australian cardiologist
- Roger Feneley (1933–2018), English urologist
- Will Feneley (born 1999), British freestyle skier

== See also ==
- Fendley
