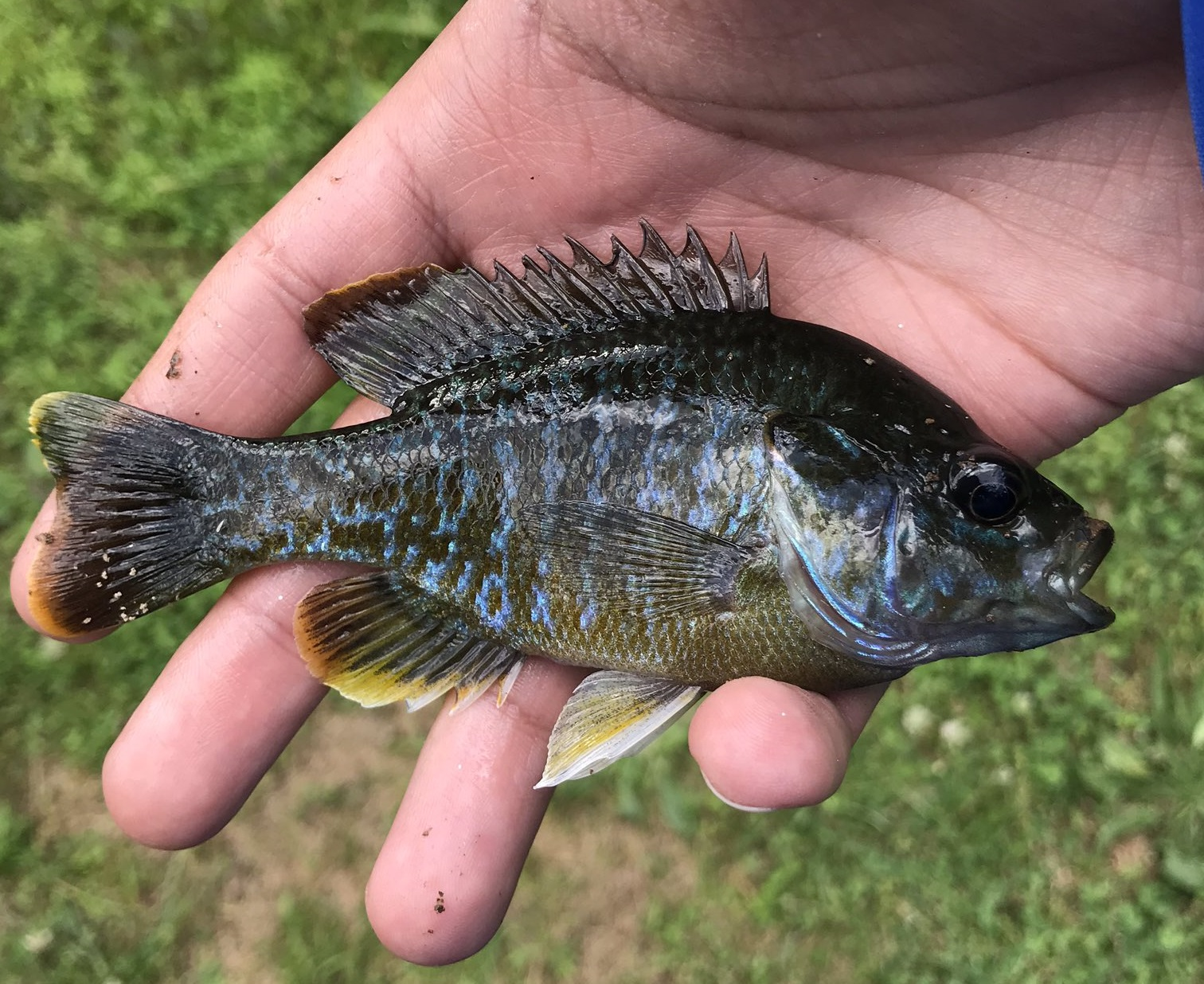

Scientific classification
- Kingdom: Animalia
- Phylum: Chordata
- Class: Actinopterygii
- Order: Centrarchiformes
- Family: Centrarchidae
- Subfamily: Lepominae
- Genus: Lepomis
- Species: L. macrochirus × L. cyanellus

= Greengill sunfish =

Hybrid fish

The greengill sunfish (Lepomis macrochirus × cyanellus) is sometimes referred to as hybrid sunfish or bluegill x green sunfish hybrid. It is a hybrid between a bluegill (Lepomis macrochirus) and green sunfish (Lepomis cyanellus). They can sometimes be found in ponds, lakes, or streams where there is both bluegill and green sunfish. They are also stocked in some ponds as gamefish and as pets.

== Description ==
While the greengill's appearance can vary from individual, they usually have certain morphological traits that are common throughout this hybrid.

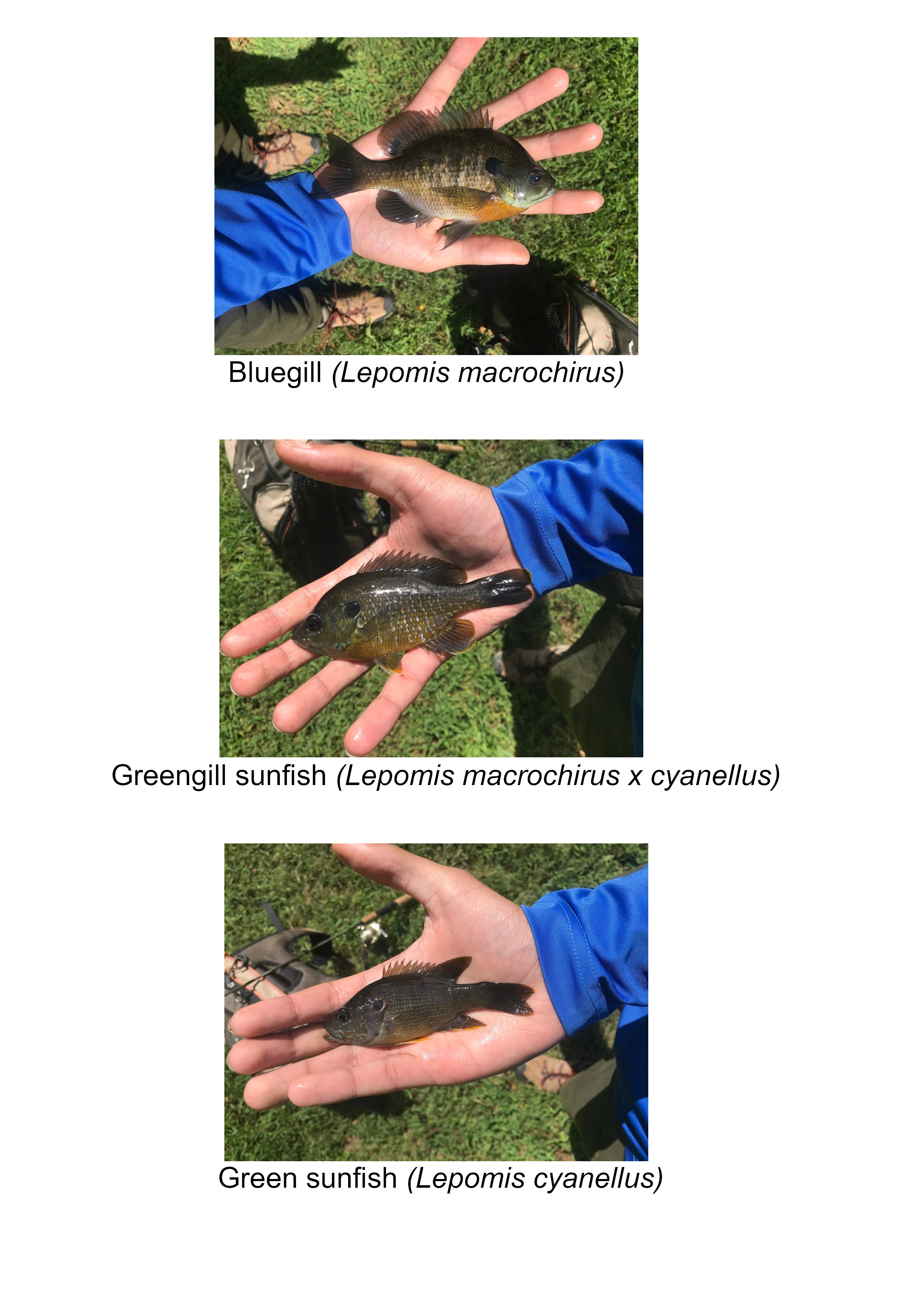
Here is chart showing the parent species of the greengill along with the hybrid itself. Species shown are bluegill (top), greengill sunfish (middle), and green sunfish (bottom).

=== Size ===
In aquaculture greengill can reach sizes up to 12 in (32 cm) and weigh around 2 pounds (965 grams). They can reach these sizes in captivity more regularly in part due a faster growth rate than both parent species. Though specimens found in the wild tend to be smaller, around 5 in (13 cm), though some can get to 6 in (16 cm).

=== Body shape ===
The body shape of greengill tend to be intermediate between both parent species. Though sometimes the body can be more elongate, like a green sunfish, or more deep, like a bluegill. The caudal fin, like most other lepomids, is emarginate in shape.

=== Coloration ===
Though the coloration and patterns on a greengill can vary due to its hybrid nature, they usually have a background color of blue that can resemble chain-like spots and stripes. The foreground coloration covering most of the body is usually dark green, brown, or black. The ventral side of the fish is often yellow or orange, though it can sometimes be darker. The coloration on the rim of the opercular flap is often orange or red with hints of white. There are usually thick iridescent blue streaks and blotches below the eye as well as on the jaw and operculum.

The greengill will normally have a dark blotch on their soft dorsal fin. This spot on the soft dorsal can be barely noticeable on some individuals. The rims of the soft dorsal, caudal, and anal fins will usually have a thin orange ridge running along them. The pelvic fins are often orange with a white coloration on the rims.

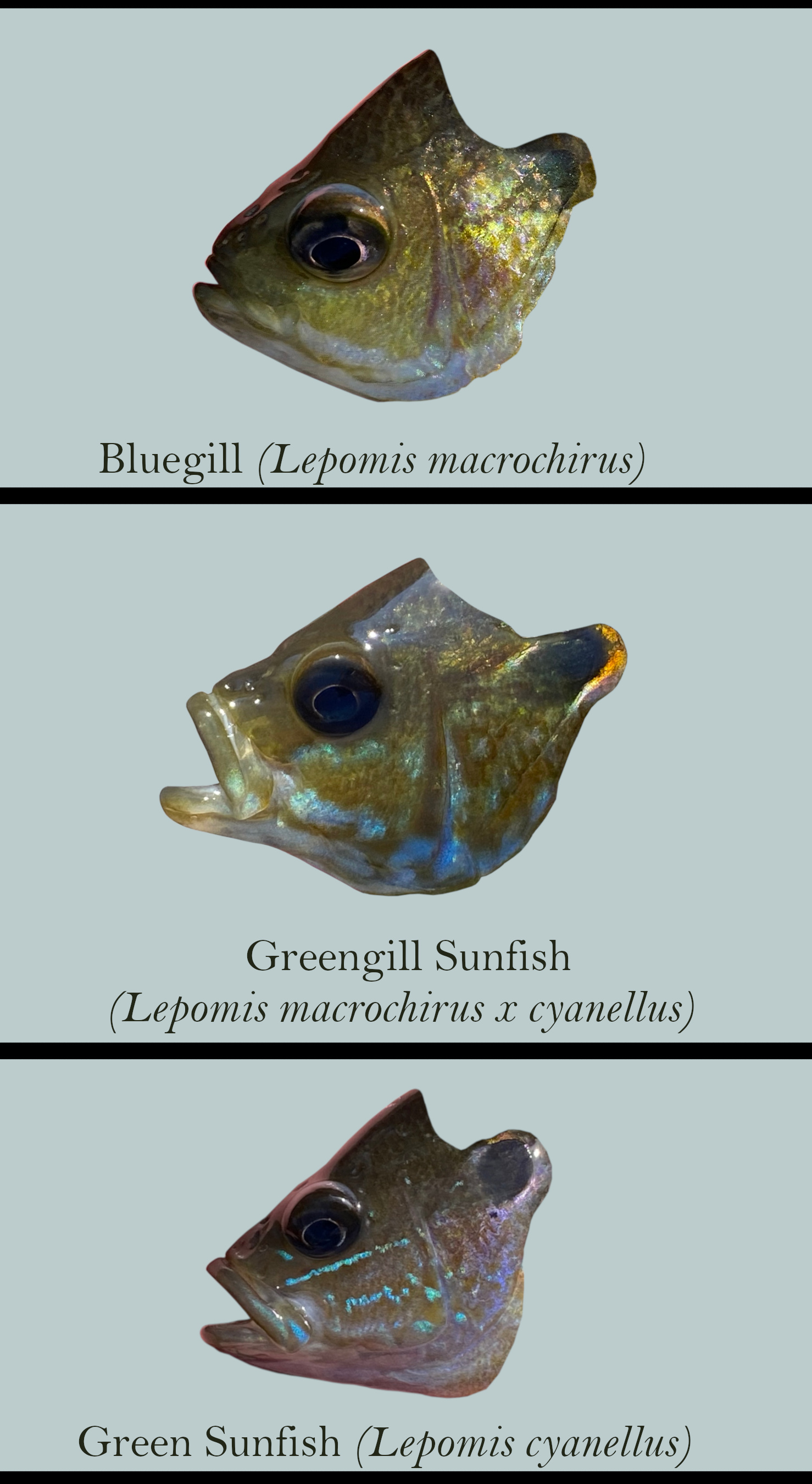
A chart displaying the heads of a greengill sunfish and its parent species. Displayed from top to bottom: Bluegill (Lepomis macrochirus), Greengill sunfish (Lepomis macrochirus x cyanellus), and Green sunfish (Lepomis cyanellus).

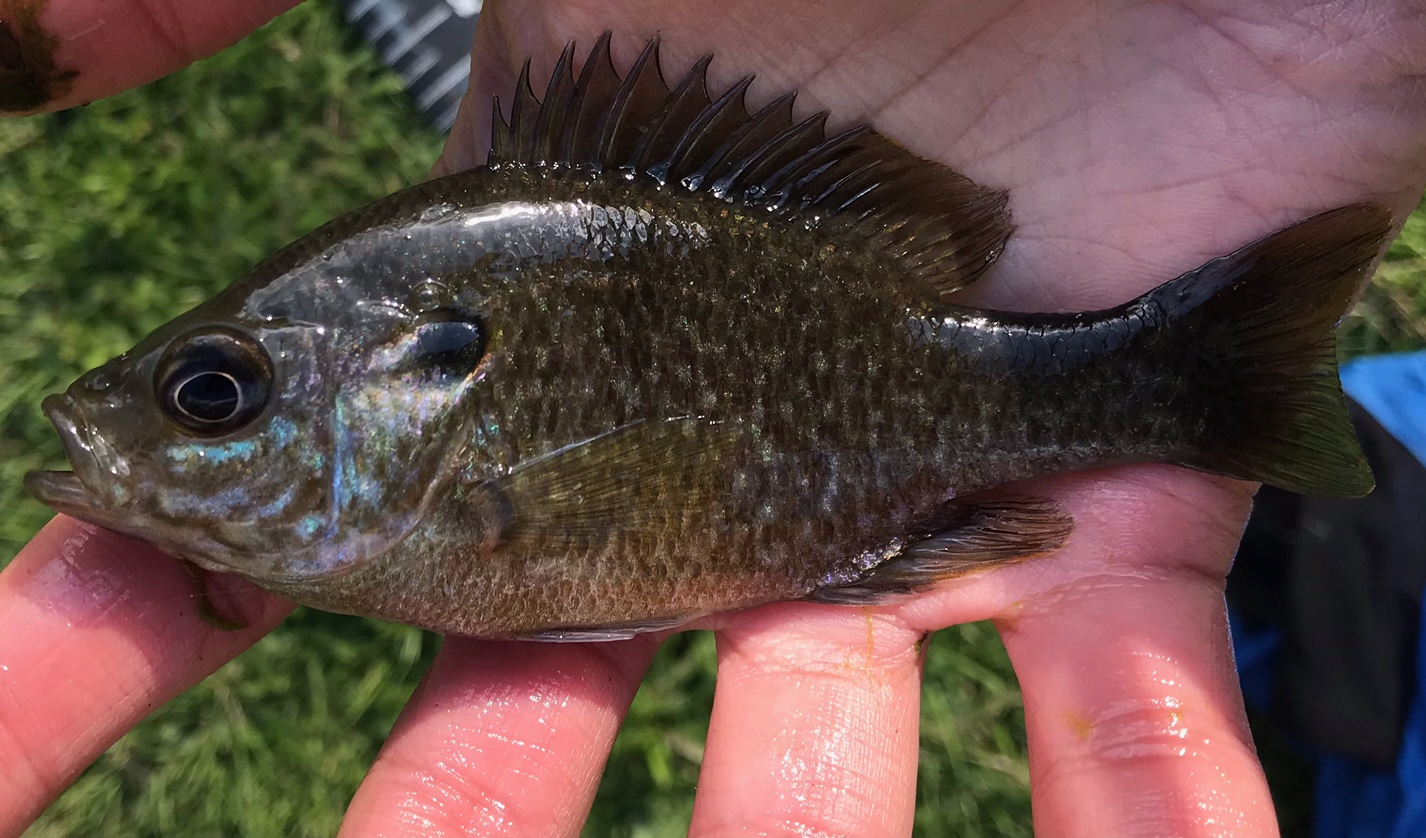
A greengill sunfish with muted colors.

== Diet ==
The greengill diet mostly consists of what the parent species ate. This includes creatures such as insects, arachnids, crayfish, and small fish. They can even be fed floating catfish pellets.
