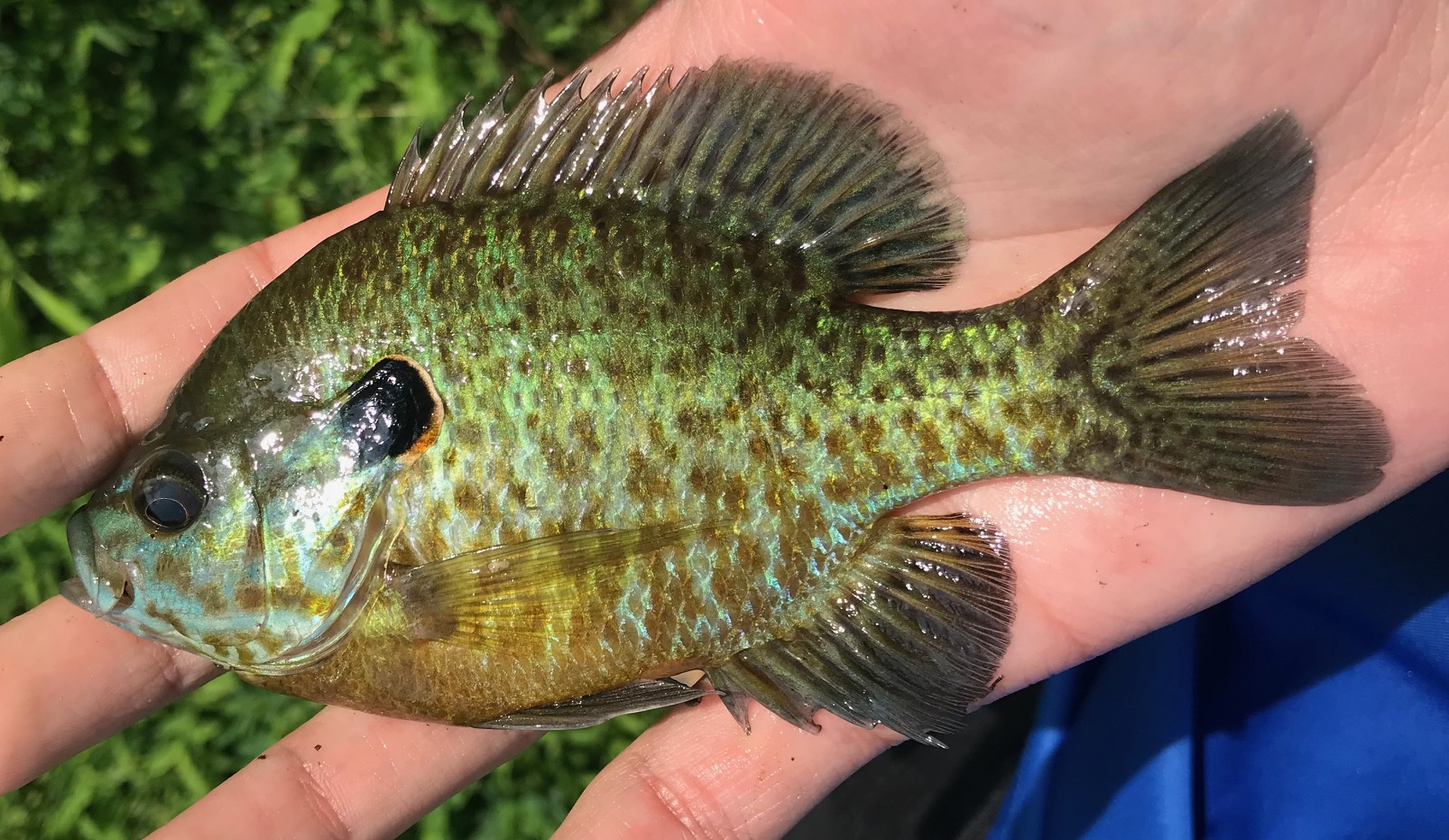

Scientific classification
- Kingdom: Animalia
- Phylum: Chordata
- Class: Actinopterygii
- Order: Centrarchiformes
- Family: Centrarchidae
- Subfamily: Lepominae
- Genus: Lepomis
- Species: L. gibbosus × L. macrochirus

= Pumpkinseed × bluegill sunfish =

Pumpkinseed x bluegill sunfish

Hybrid fish species

The pumpkinseed x bluegill sunfish (Lepomis gibbosus x macrochirus), sometimes colloquially referred to as hybrid sunfish or pumpkingill, is a hybrid between a pumpkinseed (Lepomis gibbosus) and a bluegill (Lepomis macrochirus). They are sometimes found in lakes and ponds where both parent species are present.

== Description ==
While the appearance of a pumpkinseed x bluegill sunfish can vary between individuals, they usually share a combination of traits from both parent species.

=== Coloration ===
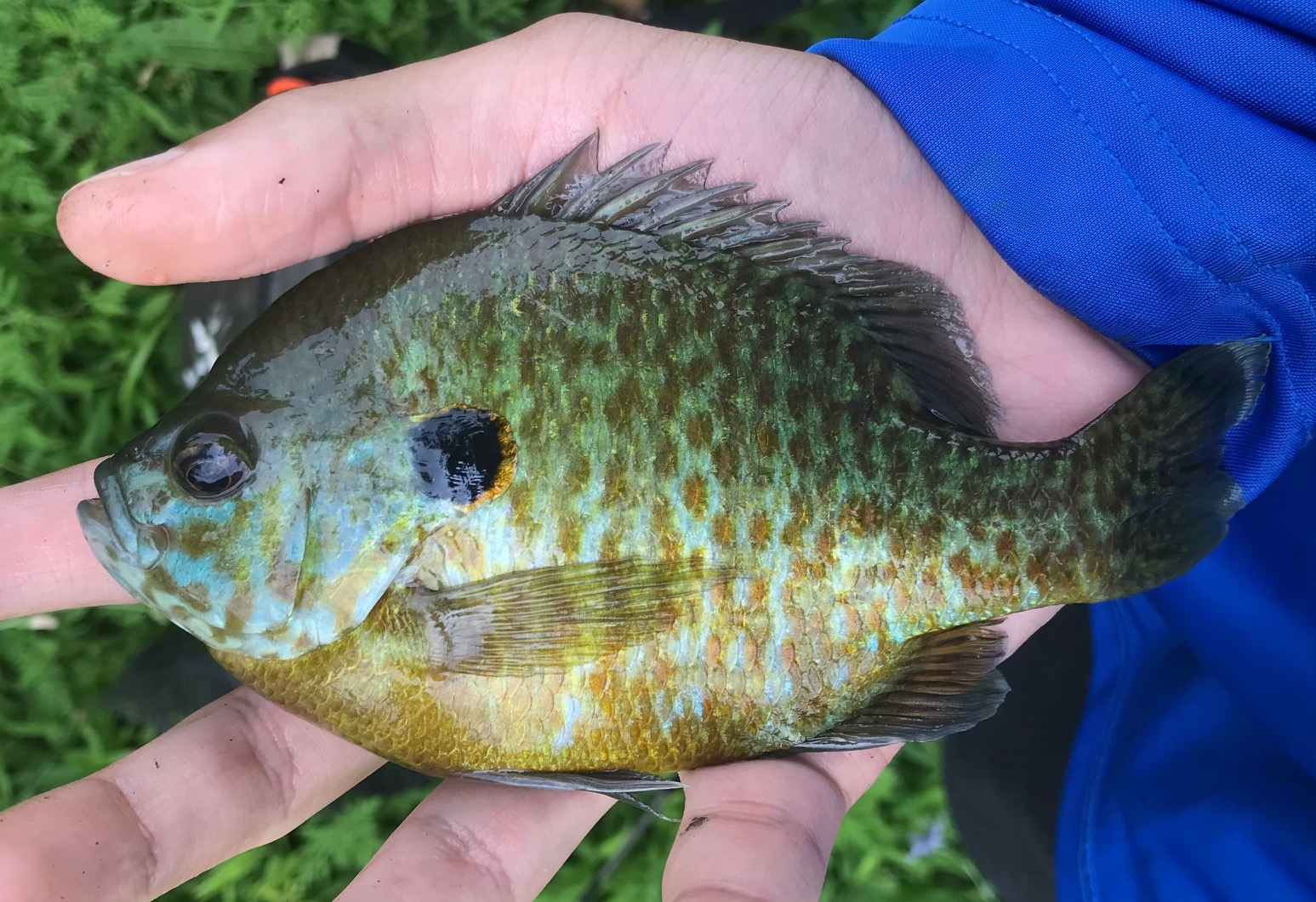
A pumpkinseed x bluegill sunfish that nicely displays the chain-like striping of a bluegill mixed with the orange spots of a pumpkinseed.

The colors can differ from bright greens and oranges to darker greens and browns. They usually have dark orange or brown spots, chain-like stripes, or most often a combination of both. The ventral side of this hybrid ranges from yellow to dark orange. The main body color is often a combination green and light blue. The blue fades into green dorsally. The opercular flap has a black spot on it with and orange rim running along its edge. The orange rim can sometimes be light and even pinkish in color. Though in some cases it can be more red like a pumpkinseed. The face of pumpkingills have faded and less prominent blue streaking on its head compared to its pumpkinseed parent.

The median fins are usually mottled. The fins on this fish are usually dark in color with faint white rims on the median fins.

== Range ==
These hybrids have been found mostly in the North Eastern and great lakes region of the United States. In states such as Connecticut they are the most common type of lepomid hybrid.

== Diet ==
They mostly eat things the parent species eat. That includes stuff such as worms, insects, small crayfish, and small fish.
