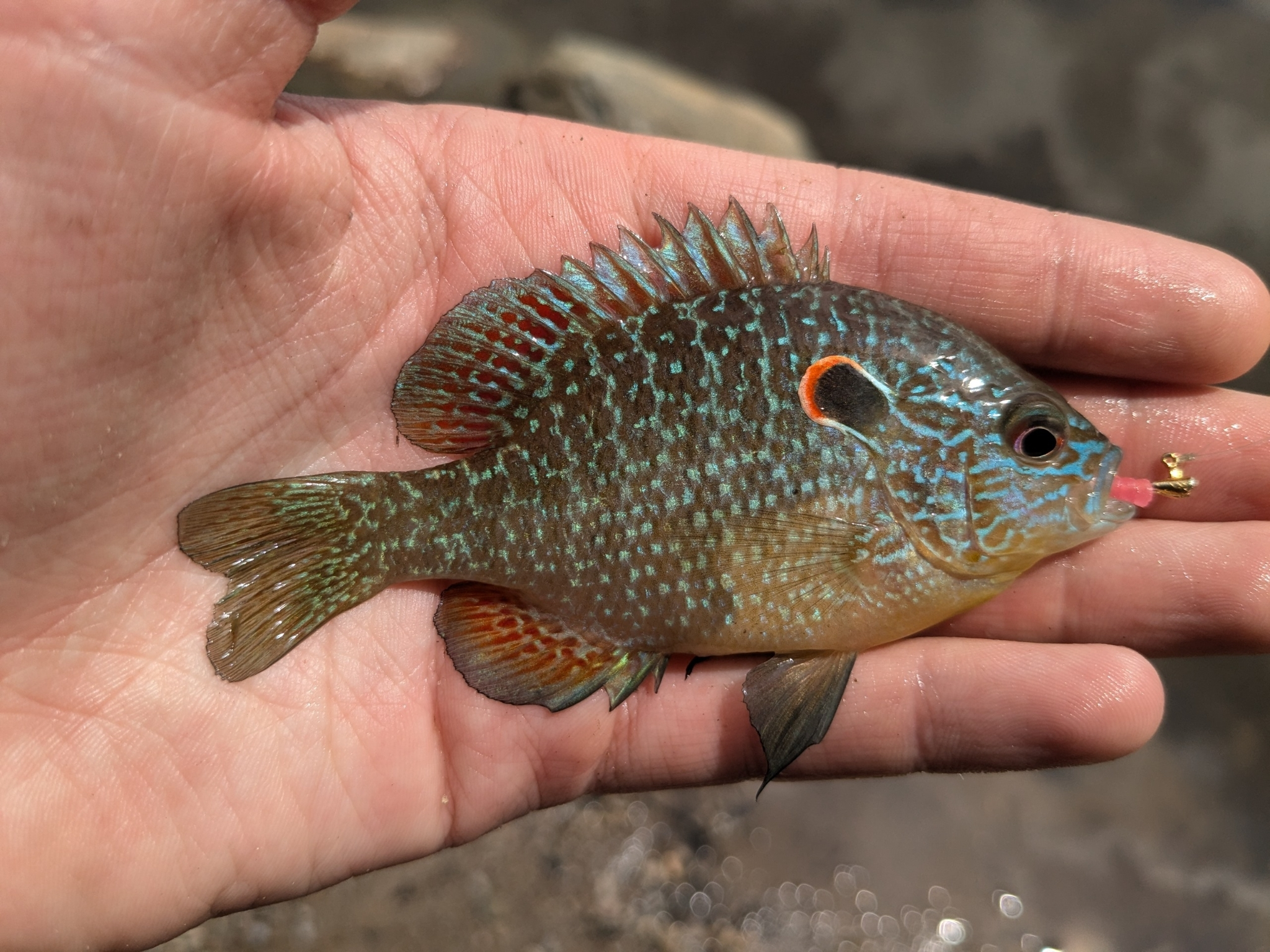

Conservation status
- Secure (NatureServe)

Scientific classification
- Kingdom: Animalia
- Phylum: Chordata
- Class: Actinopterygii
- Order: Centrarchiformes
- Family: Centrarchidae
- Genus: Lepomis
- Species: L. peltastes

Binomial name
- Lepomis peltastes Cope, 1870

= Northern sunfish =

Species of fish

The northern sunfish (Lepomis peltastes) is a freshwater fish in the centrachid family. It is endemic to the northern United States and southern Canada. Lepomis peltastes was previously recognized as a subspecies of longear sunfish (Lepomis megalotis), but is now widely considered a distinct species.

== Taxonomy ==
Due to observed phenotypic variation across the range of longear sunfish, Lepomis megalotis was described as having the following subspecies: L. m. megalotis, L. m. peltastes, L. m. aquilensis, L. m. breviceps, and L. m. occidentalis. Unlike the other four subspecies, L. m. peltastes was elevated to species without formal justification decades after its description. Despite this discrepancy, the use of L. peltastes as a valid scientific name was widely accepted. More recent phylogenomic analyses now support the separation of L. peltastes as a distinct species.

The species name peltases references the ancient Greek soldier known as a peltast. Although not explained, the allusion likely refers to the relatively large scales that E.D. Cope noted in his description of the species.

== Distribution and habitat ==
Northern sunfish inhabit the northernmost portions of North America, such as the Saint Lawrence River and Great Lakes basins, as well as Hudson Bay, the upper Mississippi River, and portions of Ontario, Canada. Populations tend to be scattered within these areas. This fish is generally found in small, quiet, temperate streams or rivers. This species prefers vegetation and back bays where they can avoid strong currents. The northern sunfish is also found in the littoral zone of clear lakes.

The simplest way to determine whether a longear sunfish is L. peltastes or L. megalotis is by range, although there is substantial overlap and introgression between these two species.

== Description ==
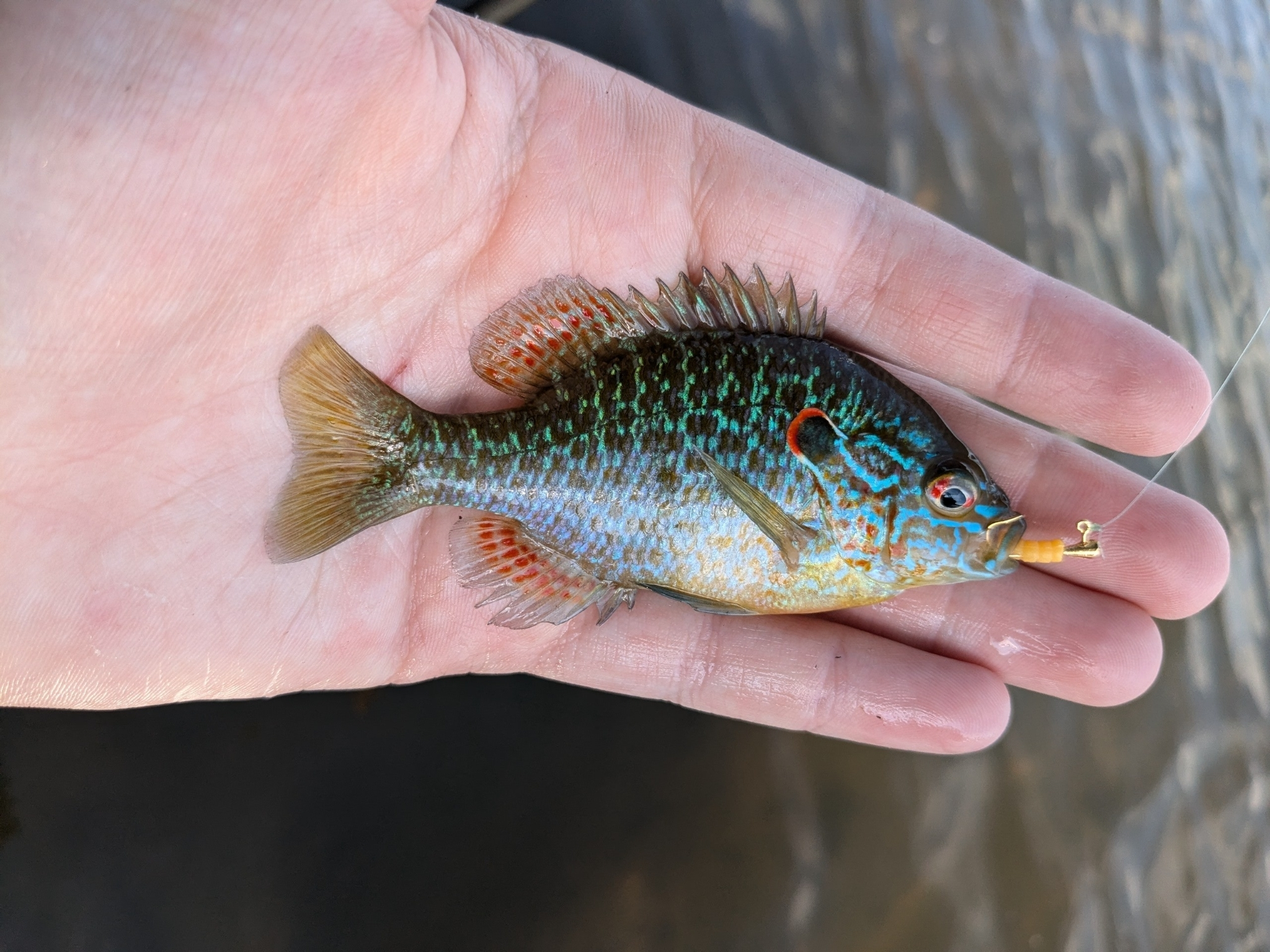
In Michigan

Northern sunfish have 34–38 ctenoid scales along their lateral line. The pectoral fin of this species is much shorter and rounded than other sunfishes.

The northern sunfish and longear sunfish are similar in appearance. Both are vibrantly-colored fish with distinct opercles. The opercle of L. peltastes tends to be steeply angled and stout, while those on L. megalotis are straighter and longer in comparison. Although each species display similar coloration, the patterns which form from these colors are different. The northern sunfish tends to have more distinct turquoise vertical barring than longear sunfish, the latter of which contains turquoise speckling or accents across the body. Some forms of longear sunfish appear much more red and orange than northern sunfish. Additionally, adult northern sunfish are typically smaller than longear sunfish, reaching a maximum total length around 12.7 cm (5.0 in). Age estimation with scales suggested the average maximum lifespan was four years, although a nine year old specimen was observed in Michigan.

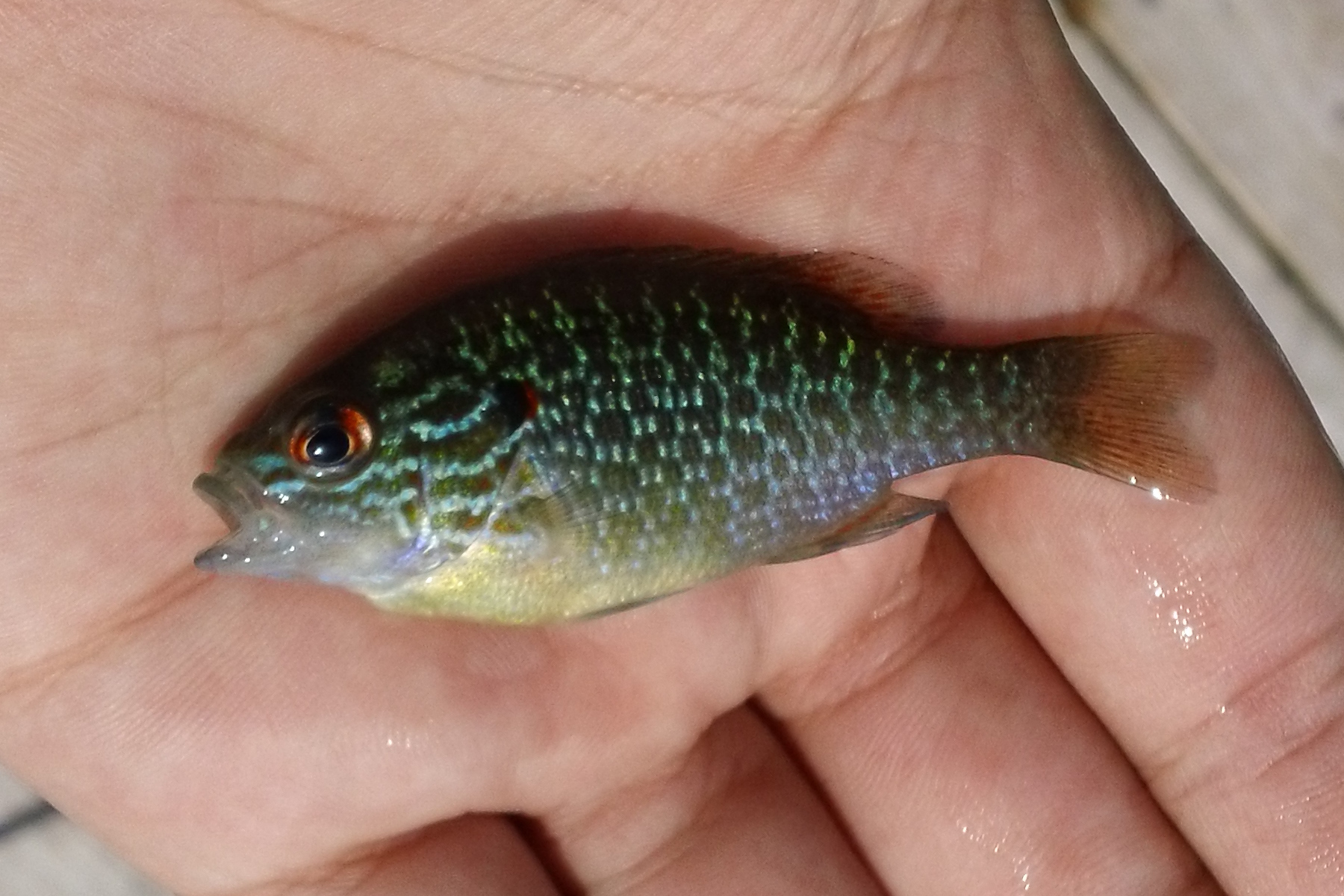
Juvenile caught at Lake Leelanau, MI.

== Diet ==
Much like longear sunfish, northern sunfish are omnivorous. They feed on aquatic and terrestrial insects, as well as other invertebrates such as mollusks and crustaceans. Stomach contents analyzed in Minnesota contained Gammarus spp., Trichoptera larvae, and Chironomidae larvae.

== Management ==
Northern sunfish are not considered a gamefish; however, population declines have occurred across much of its range over the last century. The northern sunfish is listed as threatened in Wisconsin (under the species name L. megalotis) and New York. Additionally, it is listed as a species of special concern in Minnesota and within Canada. Populations appear stable in Michigan, Illinois, and Ohio but this sunfish is presumed extirpated in Iowa and Pennsylvania. Declines in northern sunfish are speculated to be caused by siltation and water quality deterioration although competitive interactions with round goby and green sunfish have been implicated as well.
