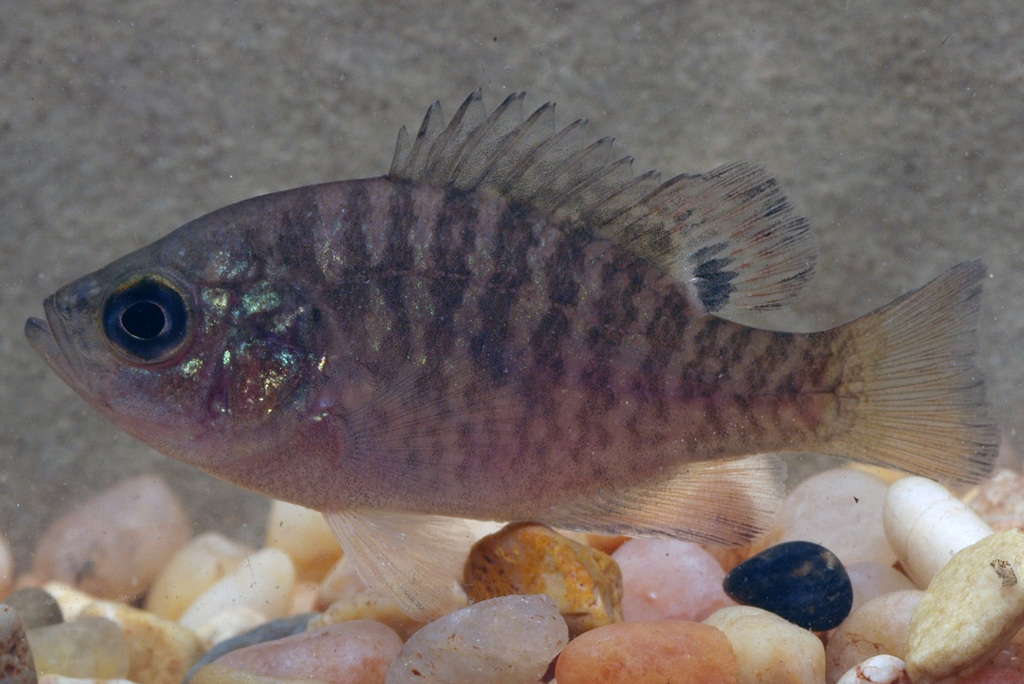

Conservation status
- Least Concern (IUCN 3.1)

Scientific classification
- Kingdom: Animalia
- Phylum: Chordata
- Class: Actinopterygii
- Order: Centrarchiformes
- Family: Centrarchidae
- Genus: Lepomis
- Species: L. symmetricus

Binomial name
- Lepomis symmetricus S. A. Forbes, 1883

= Bantam sunfish =

Species of fish

The bantam sunfish (Lepomis symmetricus) is a species of freshwater fish in the genus Lepomis common throughout Louisiana, in extreme southeastern Texas, in southern Arkansas, and in a few places in western Kentucky and western Tennessee.

== Description ==
The bantam sunfish is dark in color with around ten vertical stripes visible along each flank. The lower jaw protrudes noticeably beyond the upper.

== Distribution and habitat ==
The northern and southern boundaries for the bantam sunfish coincide fairly heavily with the former Mississippi Embayment from southern Illinois to the Gulf of Mexico. As for the eastern and western boundaries, the bantam sunfish occurs along the Gulf Coast from Eagle Lake (in the Colorado River drainage) in Texas east through the Biloxi River system in Mississippi. The species is common only in a few states. These states include Louisiana where the fish resides statewide, extreme southeastern Texas, southern Arkansas, and a few places in western Kentucky and western Tennessee. The bantam sunfish is also known to occur, less commonly, in parts of extreme southwestern Illinois, the Bootheel of Missouri, McCurtain County in Oklahoma, and some Mississippi and Gulf Coast drainages of the State of Mississippi.

Historically, isolated populations of the bantam sunfish occurred above the Fall Line in the Illinois River at Pekin, in backwater ponds and sloughs of the Wabash River drainage in White County, Illinois, and the Pine Hills. In Illinois, the range of the bantam sunfish is considered to be limited to the Wolf Lake region of Union County. Newer records extend the Illinois range of the bantam sunfish south through the Clear Creek drainage to Horseshoe Lake, Alexander County, and through the Cache River drainage in Buttonland Swamp, Limekiln Slough, and Grassy Slough. Previous collections in the Cache River drainage failed to produce any bantam sunfish.

== Ecology ==
One study of the gut contents of wild-caught bantam sunfish revealed a diverse diet dominated by gastropods, odonate larvae, and micro-crustaceans. Bantam sunfish individuals of less than 21mm in length fed primarily upon aquatic Hemiptera, micro-crustaceans, and chironomids, while individuals of more than 40 mm in length commonly ate gastropods, amphipods, and larger dipteran larvae. Bantam sunfish of all size classes regularly consumed dragonfly larvae.

The bantam sunfish has no known predators. Many predatory fish coexist in the habitat of bantam sunfish; however, predation has not been documented in literature reports. One extensive study at Wolf Lake, Illinois found no evidence of predation on the bantam sunfish. Gut analysis of potential predators, including largemouth bass, black crappie, white crappie, warmouth, bluegill, and yellow bullhead revealed a lack of predation on bantam sunfish.

The bantam sunfish typically inhabits sloughs, oxbows, ponds, backwaters, lakes, and swamps. The vegetated margins of these environments are dominated by spatterdock, American lotus, broadleaf arrowhead, coontail (Ceratophyllum demersum), and duckweed (Lemna spp.) and are the preferred habitat for this fish. Substrates commonly consist of detritus, mud, and silt, with some sand.

Environmental degradation caused by anthropogenic disturbance, particularly drainage of wetlands, is probably the greatest threat to the persistence of bantam sunfish in the wild. Wetlands and swamps have been channelized, dredged, drained, and converted to croplands. Rapid population growth in the southern portions of the United States poses multiple threats to aquatic biota as the development of land and water resources continues to accelerate. Over-collection for scientific research and educational purposes could become a problem given the bantam sunfish's short lifespan.

== Life history ==
The typical spawning period for the species throughout its range is from mid-April to early June. Only large males at least one year and 40 mm in length appear to be sexually mature and do most of the spawning. Females become sexually mature at one year of age; these individuals may be as short as 34 mm in length. However, the largest females develop the earliest mature ova and probably contribute most to the spawning effort.

There is little published data on the nest associates, nest sites and nesting behavior of the bantam sunfish in the wild. One of the few accounts is from Robinson; observations were made in a roadside pool in Saline County, Arkansas, where bantam sunfish had recently spawned in depressions in the mud and leaf litter substrate.

== Conservation ==
Environmental degradation caused by anthropogenic disturbance, particularly drainage of wetlands, is probably the greatest threat to the bantam sunfish. "We are not aware of any current management activities being employed in any states focusing on populations of L. symmetricus, except that Illinois is apparently planning possible introduction of the species back into its historic range on the Illinois River (probably backwaters or oxbow lakes) near Pekin...We are not aware of any past or current conservation activities being employed in any states focusing on populations of L. symmetricus, except for its inclusion on State lists of endangered/threatened or special concern species". Limited information on the spawning and nesting habits of bantam sunfish in the wild make it near impossible to determine if populations are reproducing at a sustainable level.
