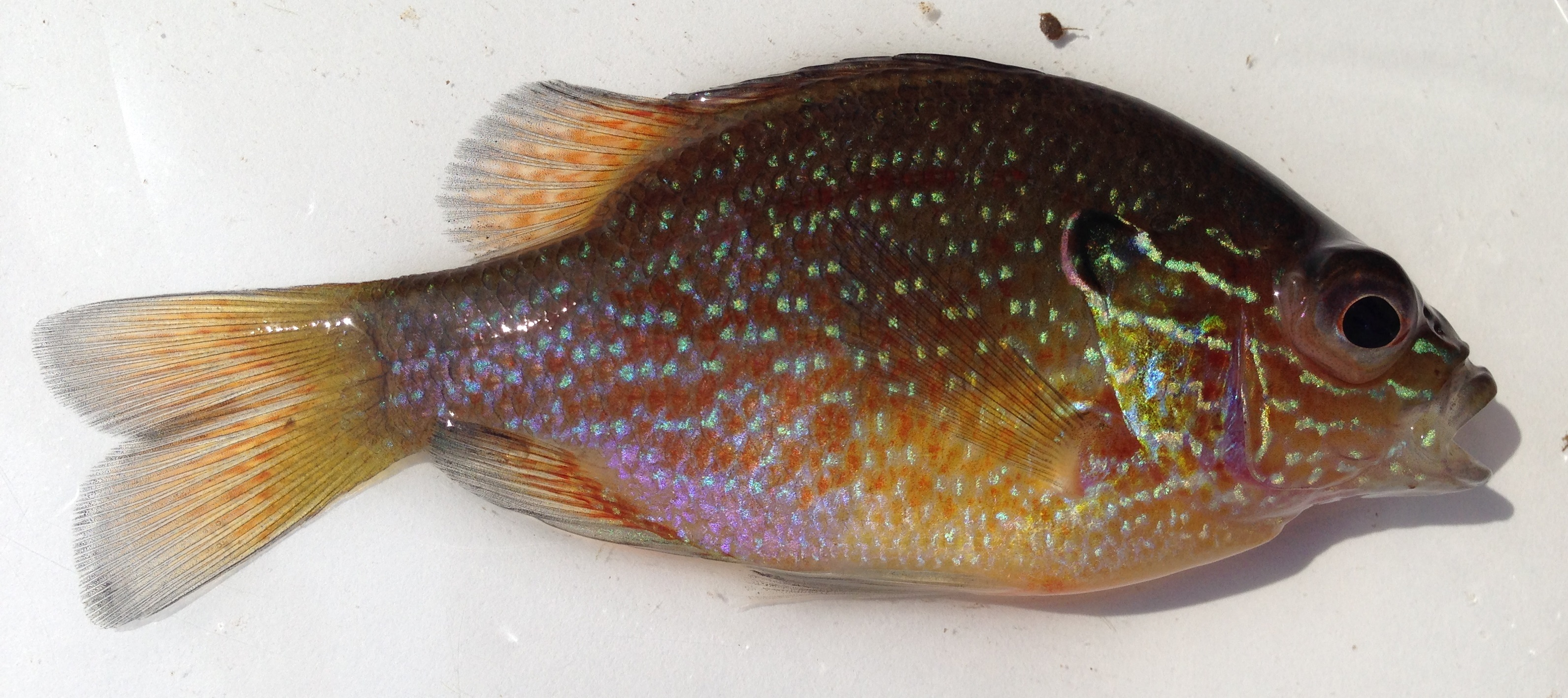

Conservation status
- Least Concern (IUCN 3.1)

Scientific classification
- Kingdom: Animalia
- Phylum: Chordata
- Class: Actinopterygii
- Division: Teleostei
- Order: Centrarchiformes
- Family: Centrarchidae
- Genus: Lepomis
- Species: L. marginatus

Binomial name
- Lepomis marginatus (Holbrook, 1855)

Synonyms
- Pomotis marginatus Holbrook, 1855

= Dollar sunfish =

Species of fish

The dollar sunfish (Lepomis marginatus) is a species of freshwater fish in the sunfish family (family Centrarchidae) of order Centrarchiformes. It is categorized as a warm-water panfish. Early settlers said that this species of sunfish resembled a European species they called "bream". Historically it has been found along the Southern Atlantic coastal drainages from North Carolina to Florida, and west to Texas. Lepomis marginatus mainly feeds on detritus and filamentous algae as well as a few terrestrial insects (Homoptera, Hymenoptera). The juvenile and mature fish do not have many predators, but the eggs in the nest are in danger of predation from a few different species of fish.

The dollar sunfish can have different breeding seasons depending on where it is located geographically. On average the dollar sunfish breeds from April to September, and in some states such as North Carolina, it breeds from May to August. They always finish breeding before the weather turns cold. These fish breed mainly on sandy substrates. "Bourgeois" males build and tend nests, court females, and care for eggs and young. The average lifespan is around six years, and it can grow up to a maximum of 100 mm.

Currently there are very well-managed creel limits for the sunfish species. The creel limits help to protect the species from being over-harvested. Other species of sunfish have been stocked in Tennessee lakes; however, the dollar sunfish has yet to be stocked in any of the river drainages of Tennessee.

== Geographic distribution ==
Historically, the dollar sunfish has been found along Southern Atlantic coastal drainages from North Carolina to Florida, and extending west to Texas. The species is most common in the southeastern United States, becoming increasingly uncommon in the western part of its range Its current range in North America is the Tar River in North Carolina to Brazos River in Texas in the US; the former Mississippi Embayment in the US from western Kentucky and eastern Arkansas south to Gulf of Mexico. There have been a few records of the dollar sunfish in the Tennessee and Mississippi river drainage. However, due to its great similarity in appearance to younger specimens of the longear sunfish, L. megalotis, the distribution of L. marginatus has not been well understood in certain portions of its range.

== Description ==
The dollar sunfish is a small sunfish species, achieving a length of 4–5 inches (10–13 cm) as an adult. Like longear sunfish, the dark ear flap on the operculum is outlined in white. There are bright blue lines that start near the fish's mouth and extend, often discontinuously, through the operculum. The dollar sunfish typically has twelve rays on each of its pectoral fins. Its lateral line is often faintly outlined in red. The caudal fin has a shallow fork. During the spawning season, males will develop brighter coloration, with deep orange color appearing along the belly accompanied by ventral extension of the rows of iridescent scales found on the body.

== Ecology ==
The micro-distribution of the dollar sunfish is characterized by a pH of 7–7.8 and a temperature of 16–28 °C (61–82 °F).

== Life history ==
The spawning season of the dollar sunfish occurs in the spring, from April–October at water temperatures of 16.8–25.6 degrees Celsius; peak spawning activity during late spring and summer. Their nests are solitary, usually adjacent to logs or some other structure; nests range from 30–94 cm in diameter, are 15–20 cm deep at center, and are usually constructed over sand. Usually the males will make the nest on a hard sand substrate. Females produce an average of 3302 eggs, with a range of 322–9206, depending on their body size. Individuals in Carolina are mature at age two and have a life span of six years.

== Management ==
Laws and regulations exist to protect dollar sunfish populations. Most states enforce a creel limit, which is a limit on the maximum number of fish that a single person can catch in one day. However, there is no creel limit or size limit for the nongame pan fish in the state of Tennessee. The dollar sunfish is not federally or state listed as threatened or endangered. However, it is vulnerable to habitat destruction. State conservation and resource agencies, such as TWRA, are currently working to protect this species. There are also some areas set aside in the Mississippi and Ohio Valley plains to help conserve the populations.
