= Findley Lake =

Findley Lake or Lake Findley may refer to:

- Findley Lake (lake), Chautauqua County, New York
  - Findley Lake, New York, a hamlet on the lake
- Lake Findley, a lake in Texas
- Lake Findley, a man-made lake located within Findley State Park
