= Fendley =

Fendley is a surname. It is phonetically and etymologically similar to Findley and Findlay.

== List of people with the surname ==
- Furman Lester Fendley (1918–2005), American politician
- Jake Fendley (1929–2002), American basketball player
- John Fendley, British television presenter
- Paul Fendley, Canadian ice hockey player

== See also ==
- Fendley Glacier
- Bud Fendley House
