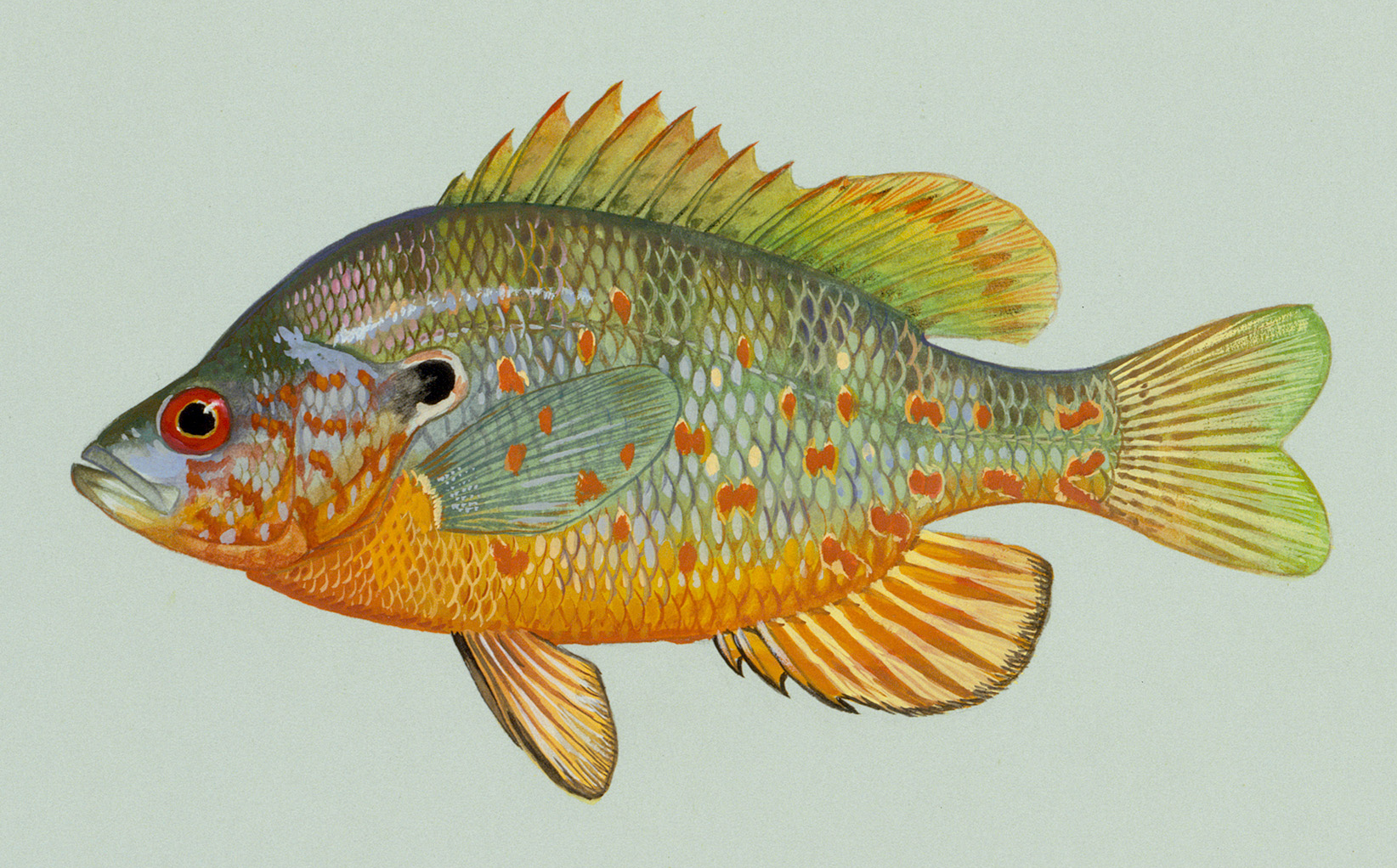

Conservation status
- Least Concern (IUCN 3.1)

- Secure (NatureServe)

Scientific classification
- Kingdom: Animalia
- Phylum: Chordata
- Class: Actinopterygii
- Order: Centrarchiformes
- Family: Centrarchidae
- Genus: Lepomis
- Species: L. humilis

Binomial name
- Lepomis humilis (Girard, 1858)

Synonyms
- Bryttus humilis Girard, 1858

= Orangespotted sunfish =

Species of fish

The orangespotted sunfish (Lepomis humilis) is a North American species of freshwater fish in the sunfish family (Centrarchidae) of order Centrarchiformes. These fish are widely distributed across the middle and eastern United States, from the Rocky Mountains to the east, from the Great Lakes south into the Gulf Coast. The orangespotted sunfish is ecologically unique and thrives in turbid, shallow systems that have few predators and low oxygen contents. The species prefers vegetated areas in sluggish backwaters or lakes, and can also be found in turbid rivers. The orangespotted sunfish can extend its range in lower-quality waters, which is not characteristic of other sunfish. Orangespotted sunfish vary in total length and age for different river basin originations, but can be found to live four to seven years, and recorded lengths are up to 15 cm (5.9 in).

Males make grunting noises to attract females to mate, and are known to nest in 'colonies' or aggregations. Spawning patterns are similar to those of other sunfish. Due to the wide distribution of this fish, the species is not endangered and management plans are almost nonexistent presently. The orangespotted sunfish has been introduced to many habitats, such as rivers in Florida, Alabama, Texas, Colorado, Michigan, and Canada.

== Geographic distribution ==
In North America, this species is common in many places; it ranges from the Great Lakes to Hudson Bay, from the Mississippi River down to the Gulf Coast and in the Colorado River from Alabama to Texas. Some studies find that, in general, orangespotted sunfish tend to live in turbid, long, large lakes, which is evident by its geographic distribution. The orangespotted sunfish is found in the Canard River near Ontario, Canada, though it is an introduced species. In Texas, this species has been introduced in the past as far south as the Rio Grande basin.

== Ecology ==
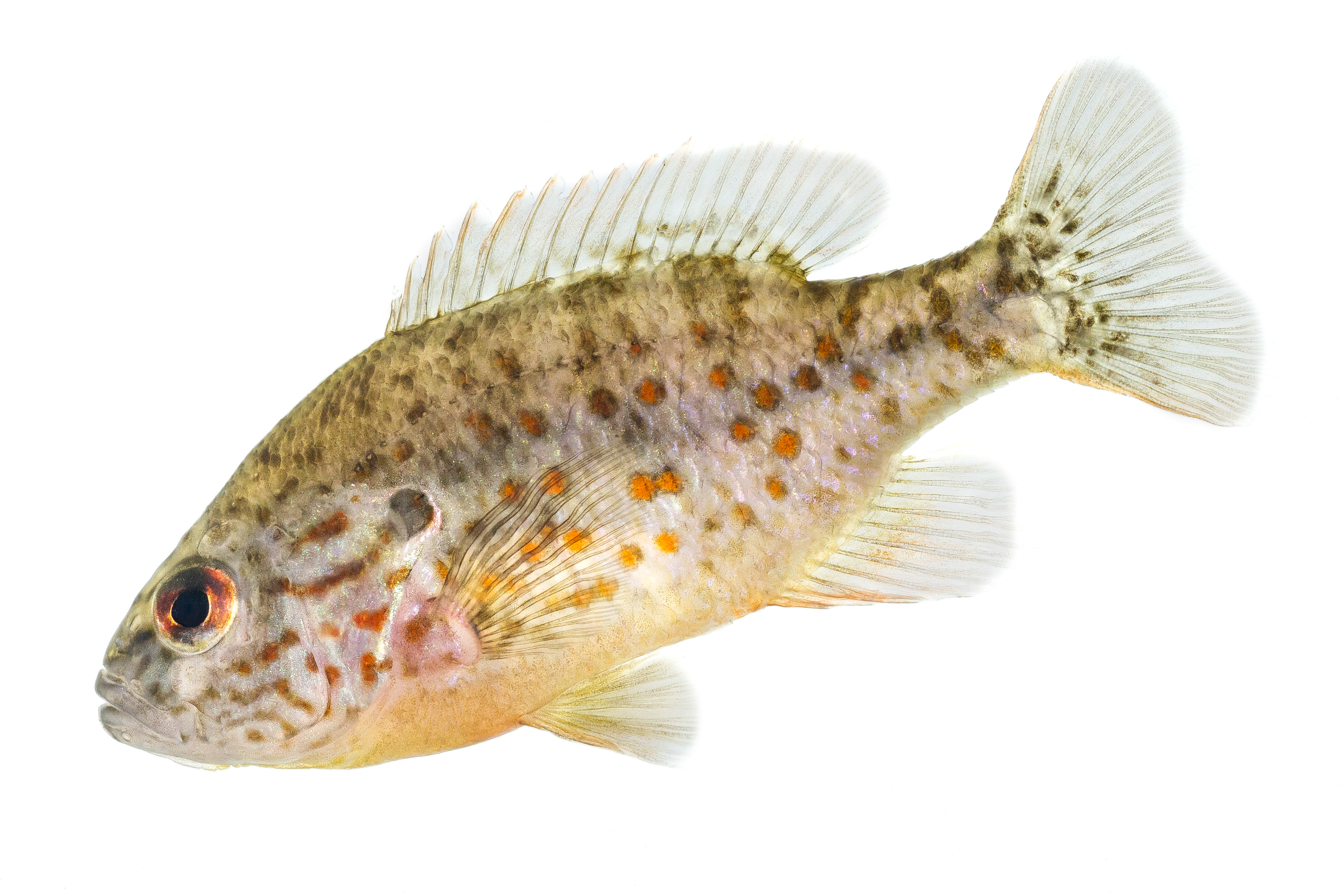
At Gavins Point National Fish Hatchery

The orangespotted sunfish prefers to reside in shallow, silt-laden waters such as floodplain pools, or waters with fine substrates such as sand. As species of the fish age and develop, they explore new territories and expand their ecological limits through migration. The dominant prey of orangespotted sunfish includes insects, such as corixids and chironomids, zooplankton, other small invertebrates that live in the water column, and fish. Though orangespotted sunfish can be found in different parts of a lake, their prey items do not vary much throughout the lake compared to other sunfish species. If reared in an environment with altered prey availability, the species has been found to show phenotypic plasticity or morphological differences in response to this changed environmental condition. Certain prey types require different methods of prey capture, so as the orangespotted sunfish develop, their body can be more elongated with an angled snout, or more deep-bodied with a blunt snout, depending on the prey type.

== Life history ==
Orangespotted sunfish breed once or twice in June and July, like most other sunfish, in colonies in shallow water near shore. Floodplain and backwater areas are known to include important spawning and nursery sites for orangespotted sunfish. Its reproductive classification is a lithopelagophil, which means the fish spawn on gravel and the embryos are pelagic. Orangespotted sunfish nesting areas are often geographically close by other species' areas and easily become crowded, which can increase the incidence of hybridization with other Lepomis. Other fish species, such as Topeka shiners (Notropis topeka), are said to be 'nest associates' of orangespotted and other sunfishes, meaning they establish spawning territories on the periphery of sunfish nests. This is because nesting sunfish have been known to expose suitable spawning sites for other species, like the Topeka shiner, by fanning the spot with their caudal fins to aerate the eggs.

Some sunfish species make courtship sounds to attract females. For instance, when nesting orangespotted sunfish males see a female, they make grunting sounds while rushing back and forth between the female and the nest repeatedly to try to win her. The amplitude and frequency of the courtship sounds of orangespotted sunfish are distinct to the species and can be differentiated by female listeners from the sounds of other sunfish species if they do not occur simultaneously. Orangespotted sunfish have a maximum age between four and seven years, an average length of 3 cm (1.2 in), and can reach a maximum recorded length of about 15 cm (5.9 in).

== Current management ==
The floodplain environment is easily subject to change, by natural or human activities. In many habitats that are natural homes to orangespotted sunfish, connectivity between rivers and lakes has been altered and flooding incidents have been reduced for agricultural gain. The orangespotted sunfish is one of many species that are characteristic to floodplain lakes and has been affected by the degradation of this system. The flat nature of floodplain lake areas makes agricultural runoff and runoff from manufacturers a distinct problem to water quality. Inputs from runoff can increase sedimentation, which has many detrimental effects to habitats, such as reduced oxygen concentration and lake eutrophication, a nutrient enrichment of lake water from runoff. Fortunately for orangespotted sunfish, a species that thrives in turbid, shallow systems with low oxygen content, increased sedimentation is not decreasing their habitat, though the changes may be fragmenting the habitat.

In Canada, according to the Fisheries Act, this and all fish species are required to be protected for spawning, nursery, and residence habitat through proper species management. Currently, studies have used many methods to assess orangespotted sunfish population assemblages such as traps of plastic netting, pulsed DC electrofishing, tandem fyke and mini-fyke nets.

== Management recommendations ==
This species is not as vulnerable to human-induced change as most freshwater fish. The orangespotted sunfish lives in lakes largely surrounded by agricultural areas, so collaboration between managers, farmers and other watershed managing organizations in the region is necessary. Watershed disorders, such as increased sedimentation and turbidity, must be addressed first by management planners when designing a plan for orangespotted sunfish. Not much information has been collected on the changes of floodplain waters, and more is needed to fully understand the needs of the orangespotted sunfish before management can be implemented. One solution to decrease lake sedimentation is through a process of 'lake drawdowns,' which are installed by managers to compact sediments and controlled by pumps. The drawdowns mimic pre-dam conditions that would naturally harden and compact sediment. This process can be expensive, but it has already been implemented by the United States Army Corps of Engineers in Swan Lake, Illinois through their habitat rehabilitation and enhancement project (HREP). Seasonal drawdowns can increase river connectivity and has been seen to increase habitat for orangespotted sunfish populations.

Water pollution by energy plants, such as the one monitored by TDEC, is a long-term problem that will have to be taken into account by managers for many years. More studies should be done in all documented locations of orangespotted sunfish to assess the current population assemblages, and to track any future changes that occur. Monitoring can be done through the use of nets or electrofishing to measure population densities. At present, no lands need to be protected for this non-endangered fish, but careful consideration should be taken if new dams are created that fragment the orangespotted sunfish's habitat.
