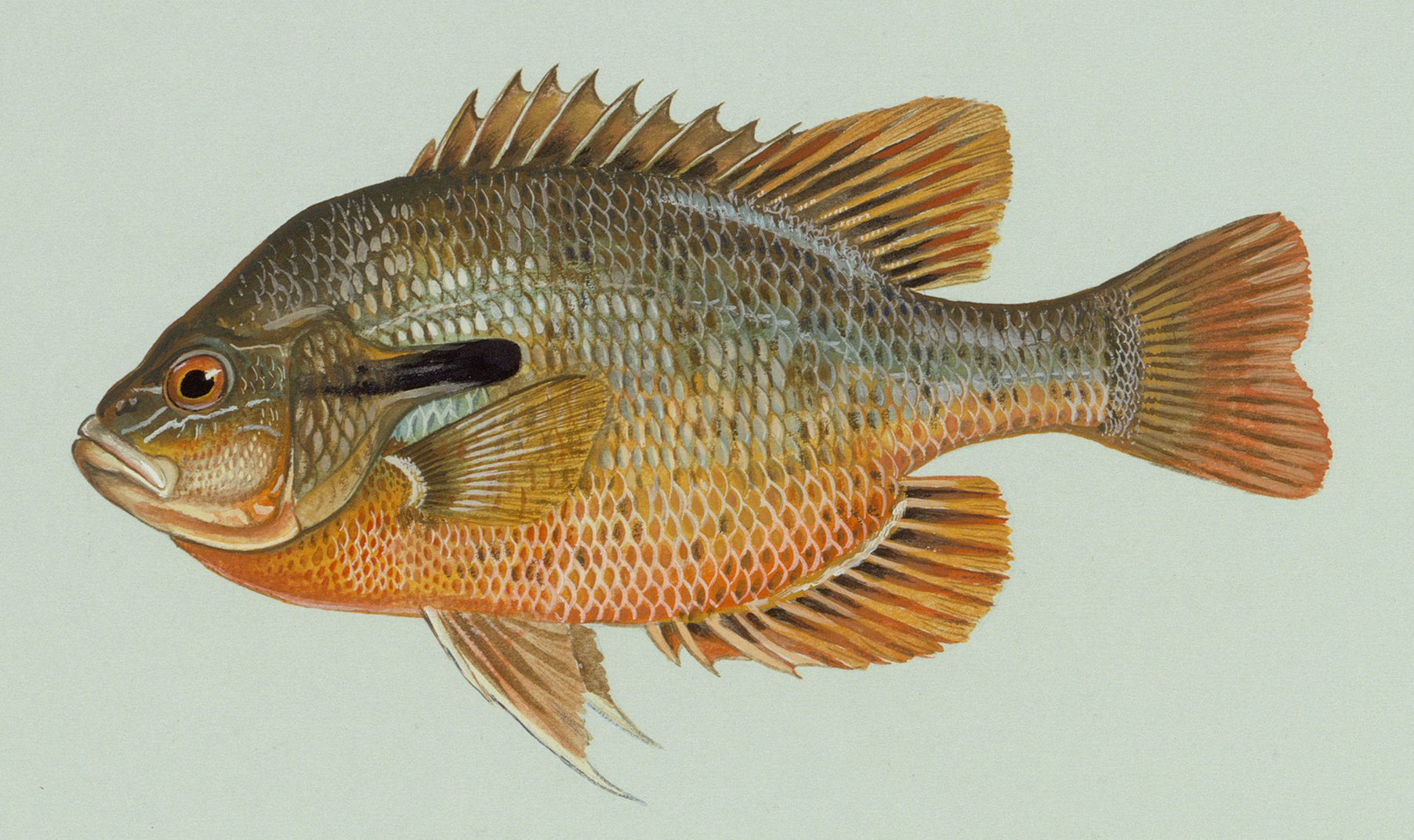
- Redbreast sunfish (L. auritus), the type species of the genus

Scientific classification
- Kingdom: Animalia
- Phylum: Chordata
- Class: Actinopterygii
- Division: Teleostei
- Order: Centrarchiformes
- Family: Centrarchidae
- Subfamily: Lepominae
- Genus: Lepomis; Rafinesque, 1819

Type species
- Lepomis auritus Linnaeus, 1758

Synonyms
- List: Allotis Hubbs, 1927; Apomotis Rafinesque, 1819; Bryttus Valenciennes, 1831; Chaenobryttus Gill, 1864; Erichaeta Jordan, 1877; Eupomotis Gill & Jordan, 1877; Glossoplites Jordan, 1876; Helioperca Jordan, 1877; Icthelis Rafinesque, 1820; Pomotis Cuvier, 1829; Pomotis Rafinesque, 1819; Sclerotis Hubbs, 1927; Telipomis Rafinesque, 1820; Xenotis Jordan, 1877; Xystroplites Jordan, 1877

= Lepomis =

Lepomis Temporal range: Middle Miocene to recent

Genus of fishes

Lepomis or true sunfish is a genus of North American freshwater fish from the family Centrarchidae in the order Centrarchiformes. The generic name Lepomis derives from the Greek λεπίς ("scale") and πῶμα ("cover", "plug", "operculum"). The genus' most recognizable species is perhaps the bluegill.

Some Lepomis species can grow to a maximum overall length of 41 cm (16 in), though most average around 10–20 cm (3.9–7.9 in). Many species are sought by anglers as popular panfishes, and large numbers are bred and stocked in lakes, rivers, ponds and wetlands. They are widely distributed throughout the freshwater lakes and river tributaries of the United States and Canada, and several species have been translocated and flourished around the world, even becoming pests. Aquarium trade in some Lepomis species is prohibited in Germany for this reason.

Lepomis species, among others, are sometimes referred to as bream, but the term is also used to refer explicitly to the unrelated European cypriniform fish of genus Abramis.

== Phylogeny ==
Phylogeny of all Lepomis species based on a partitioned mixed-model Bayesian analysis of a seven gene dataset of mitochondrial and nuclear gene DNA sequences by Near et al. (2005), expanded with fossil species. Subgenera in bold follow Bailey (1938):

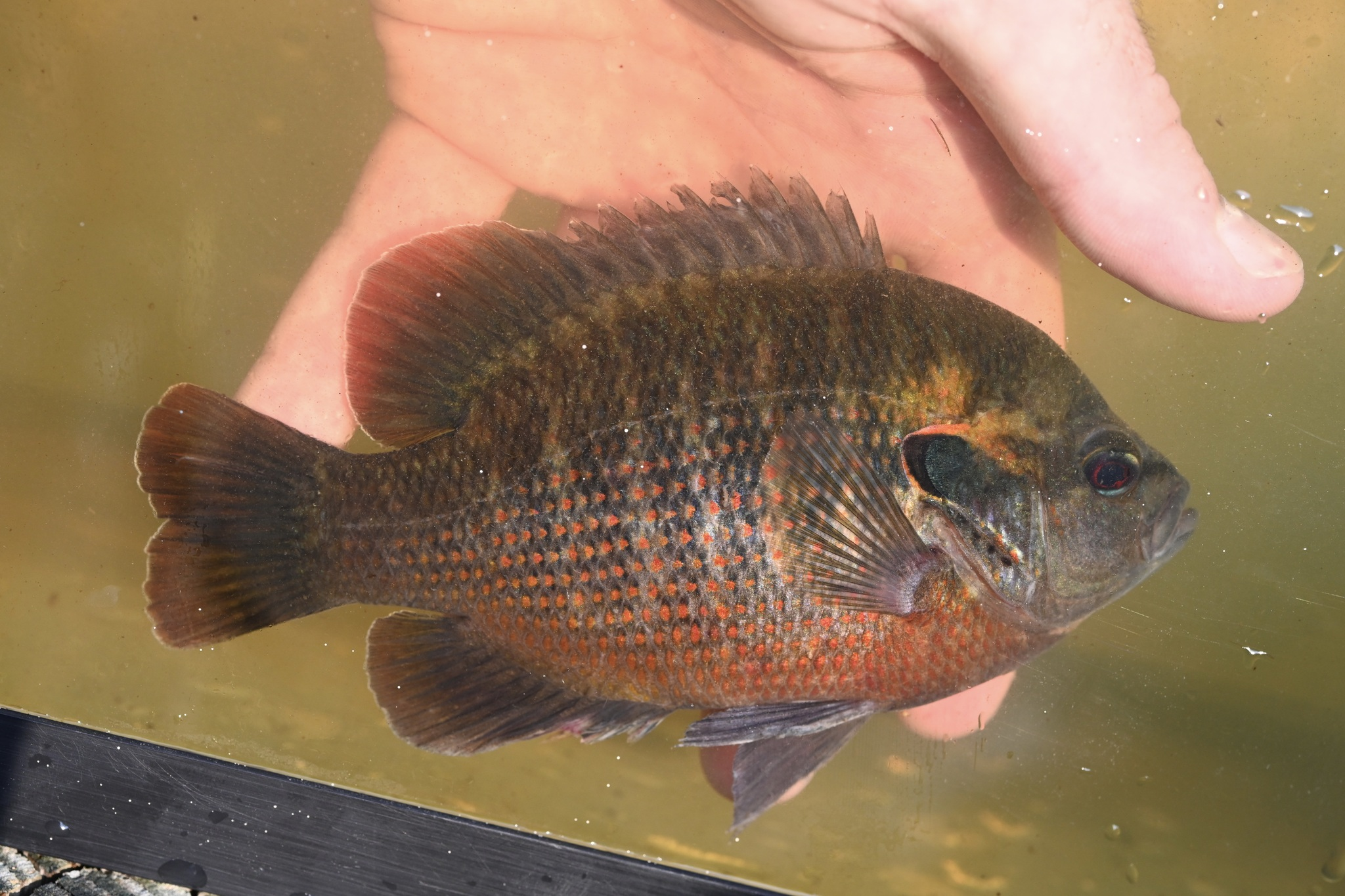
A redspotted sunfish observed in Anderson County, Texas

- - genus **Micropterus**
  - genus **Lepomis**
    - **clade I****
      - - L. humilis
        - L. macrochirus
      - - clade **Chaenobryttus**
          - L. gulosus
          - L. kansasensis^{†}
          - L. serratus^{†}
        - clade **Apomotis**
          - L. symmetricus
          - L. cyanellus
    - **clade II****
      - - subgen. **Lepomis**
          - L. auritus
          - clade **Icthelis**
            - L. marginatus
            - - L. peltastes*
              - L. megalotis
        - subgen. **Eupomotis**
          - L. gibbosus
          - - L. microlophus
            - clade **Bryttus**
              - L. punctatus
              - L. miniatus
      - L. sp. A ^{†}***

^{*)} L. peltastes was not originally included in the analysis by Near et al. (2005) and is included here based on commonly accepted sister relationship to L. megalotis.

^{**)} See section 'Evolutionary History' below for explanation.

^{***)} Phylogenetic position in clade II uncertain. See section 'Fossil record' for clarification.

== Evolutionary history ==
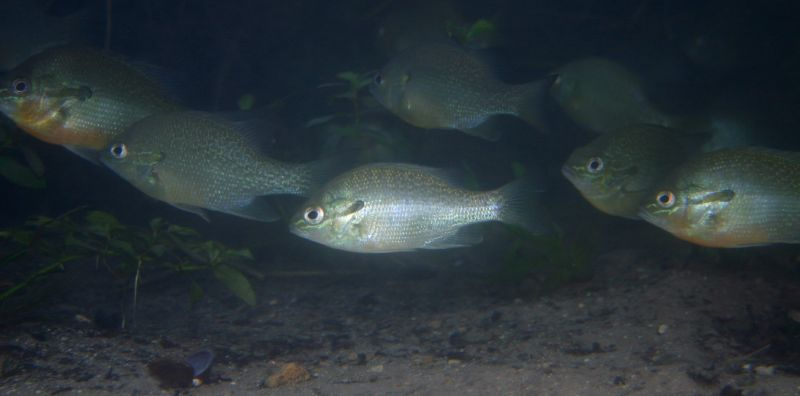
Longear sunfish (L. megalotis) schooling with redbreast sunfish (L. auritus), in Texas

Phylogenetic reconstructions using a combination of nuclear and mitochondrial DNA sequences calibrated with fossils to estimate ages of divergences suggests that the genus Lepomis diverged from the black bass in genus Micropterus, its sister taxon, about 25 million years ago. The deepest split among currently living species of Lepomis is dated to ~15 million years ago and separates genus Lepomis into two clades: clade I that leads to the modern bluegill, orange-spotted, green, and warmouth sunfish, and a clade II that includes the modern long-ear, red-breasted, pumpkinseed, redear, and red-spotted sunfish (see section 'Phylogeny' above). The timing of this speciation event roughly corresponds with the Middle Miocene disruption that resulted in increased aridity on the plains of North America and a transition from savannah to grasslands, although the relevance of these environmental changes to the evolution of Lepomis is unclear.

== Fossil record ==
No fossils unambiguously assigned to genus Lepomis are currently known from the putative stem-lineage that must have existed between 25 and 15 million years ago, spanning most of the early Miocene.

Currently, four extinct species of Lepomis are known from the fossil record:

There are at least two as yet undescribed fossil species of Lepomis that reach back to the middle Miocene:

- †Lepomis sp. A consists of fragmentary fossils of its lower jaw from the Valentine Formation of Nebraska, dated to 13.5 million years ago, and shows morphological similarities to the modern Lepomis microlophus, although its great age means that this species predates the divergence of any of the living species.
- †Lepomis sp. B was found in deposits from the Ogallala Formation of Kansas, dated to 12 million years ago.

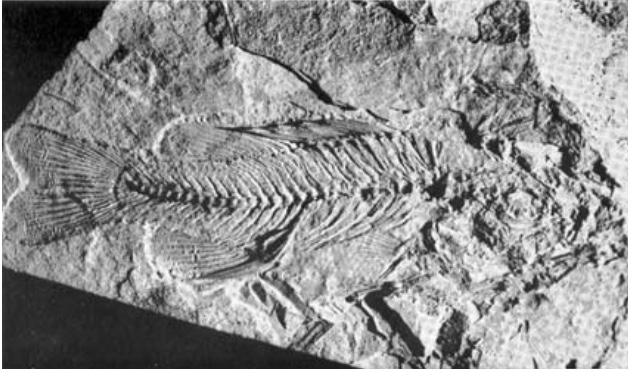
Fossil of †Lepomis kansasensis

Two other more recent fossil species appear to be closely allied to Lepomis gulosus, and indeed their earliest occurrence may be close to the divergence of the lineage leading to the modern warmouth from other species of Lepomis:

- †Lepomis kansasensis lived 6.6 million years ago in the Ogallala Formation of Kansas, and had pterygoid teeth, indicating a close relationship to the warmouth.
- †Lepomis serratus is known from 3.4 to 2.0 million year old deposits in the Keim Formation of Nebraska, and also appears to be closely related to or ancestral to the warmouth on the basis of its preopercle.

== Species ==
There are currently 13 recognized species in this genus:

Image	Species	Common name	Distribution
	Lepomis aquilensis (Baird & Girard, 1853)	plains longear sunfish	
	Lepomis auritus (Linnaeus, 1758)	redbreast sunfish	
	Lepomis cyanellus (Rafinesque, 1819)	green sunfish	
	Lepomis gibbosus (Linnaeus, 1758)	pumpkinseed	
	Lepomis gulosus (G. Cuvier, 1829)	warmouth	
	Lepomis humilis (Girard, 1858)	orangespotted sunfish	
	Lepomis macrochirus (Rafinesque, 1819)	bluegill	
	Lepomis marginatus (Holbrook, 1855)	dollar sunfish	
	Lepomis megalotis (Rafinesque, 1820)	longear sunfish	
	Lepomis microlophus (Günther, 1859)	redear sunfish	
	Lepomis miniatus (D. S. Jordan, 1877)	redspotted sunfish	
	Lepomis peltastes (Cope, 1870)	northern sunfish	
	Lepomis punctatus (Valenciennes, 1831)	spotted sunfish	
	Lepomis solis (Valenciennes, 1831)	swampland longear sunfish	
	Lepomis symmetricus (S. A. Forbes, 1883)	bantam sunfish	

== Hybridization ==
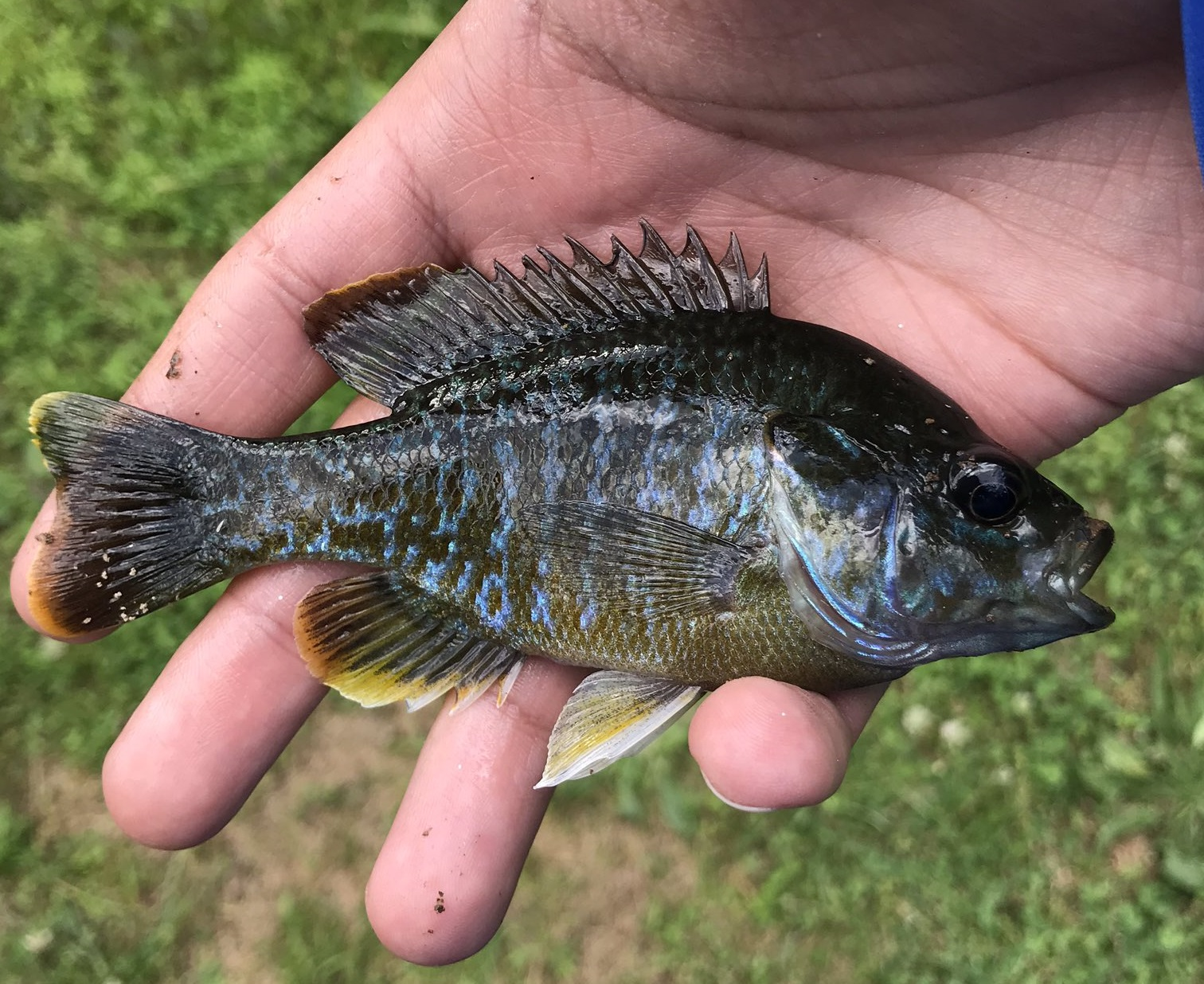
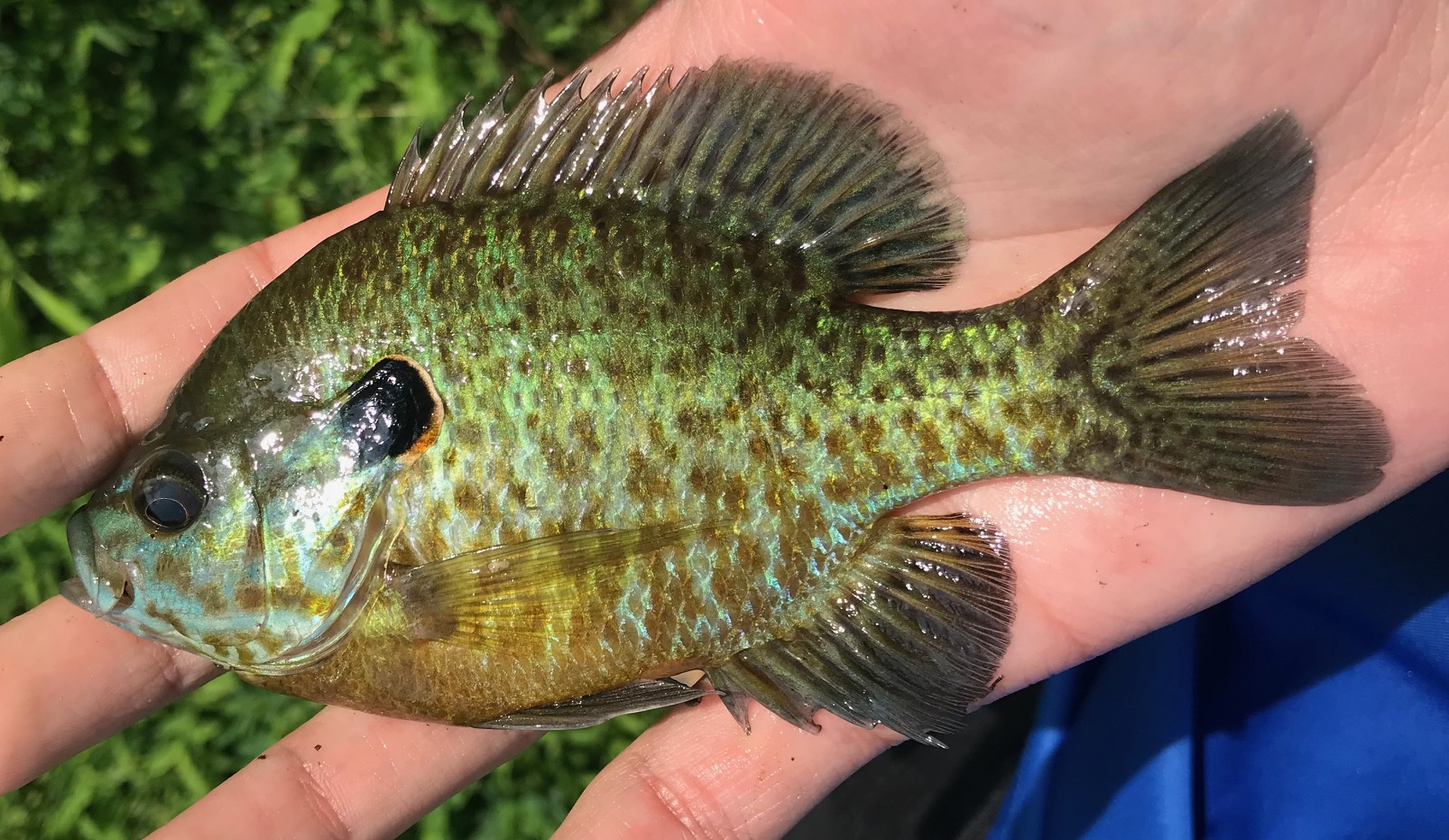
Greengill (top) and pumpkingill (bottom), in Howard County, Maryland

Lepomis frequently hybridize and many different hybrid combinations have been observed in the wild. Some of these hybrids include:

- Lepomis macrochirus × cyanellus (greengill sunfish)
- Lepomis macrochirus x microlophus (gillcracker)
- Lepomis cyanellus x gibbosus (pumpgreen sunfish)
- Lepomis cyanellus x gulosus (green sunfish x warmouth)
- Lepomis gulosus x macrochirus (warmouth x bluegill)
- Lepomis macrochirus x megalotis (bluegill x longear sunfish)
- Lepomis gibbosus x macrochirus (pumpkingill)
- Lepomis auritus x cyanellus (redbreast x green sunfish)
- Lepomis microlophus x cyanellus (redear x green sunfish)
- Lepomis auritus x microlophus (redbreast x redear sunfish)
- Lepomis macrochirus x punctatus (bluegill x spotted sunfish)
- Lepomis gibbosus x peltastes (pumpkinseed x northern sunfish)
- Lepomis megalotis x cyanellus (longear x green sunfish)
- Lepomis miniatus x punctatus (redspotted x spotted sunfish)
