= Furman Lester Fendley =

American politician

Member of the South Carolina House of Representatives
- In office 1965–???

Personal details
- Born: May 16, 1918 Westminster, South Carolina, U.S.
- Died: November 30, 2005 (aged 87)

Furman Lester Fendley (May 16, 1918 – November 30, 2005) was an American politician. He served as a member of the South Carolina House of Representatives.

== Life and career ==
Fendley was born in Westminster, South Carolina.

In 1965, Fendley was elected to the South Carolina House of Representatives, representing Union County, South Carolina.

Fendley died in November 2005, at the age of 87.
