= Trent Findley =

American football player (born 1980)

Trenton Findley (born October 19, 1980, in Louisville, Kentucky) is a former American football cornerback.

== Early years ==
Findley was a standout in football, basketball, and track and field at Louisville Male High School in Louisville, Kentucky, where he earned all-state honors in 1998. Findley was one of Gerry Ahrens' favorite receivers helping the Bulldogs to a Class 4A State Championship in 1998 while piling up 56 receptions for 867 yards and 8 touchdowns, including a 15 pass-reception-performance in the annual Male-Manual rivalry game, the longest running, continuously played, high school football series in Kentucky.

Findley finished fifth in the Class 3A Boys 110 Meter High Hurdles with a time of 15.84 seconds.

Findley was also a participant in the 1999 Annual Kentucky-Tennessee All-Star Game.

== College career ==
Findley was a standout football player at the University of Tennessee at Martin who is a member of the NCAA FCS Division's Ohio Valley Conference. Findley had 9 career interceptions for 113 yards and 2 touchdowns, along with 2 fumble recoveries, and 46 punt and kick returns starting in 31 career games at cornerback.

Findley played in the 2003 Paradise Bowl, a post-season all star game, in St. George, Utah.

== Professional career ==
Though Findley was a highly touted NFL draft prospect in 2003, injuries caused him to go undrafted and unsigned in 2003. He would later sign a free agent contract with the Calgary Stampeders of the Canadian Football League. He was released later that year.
