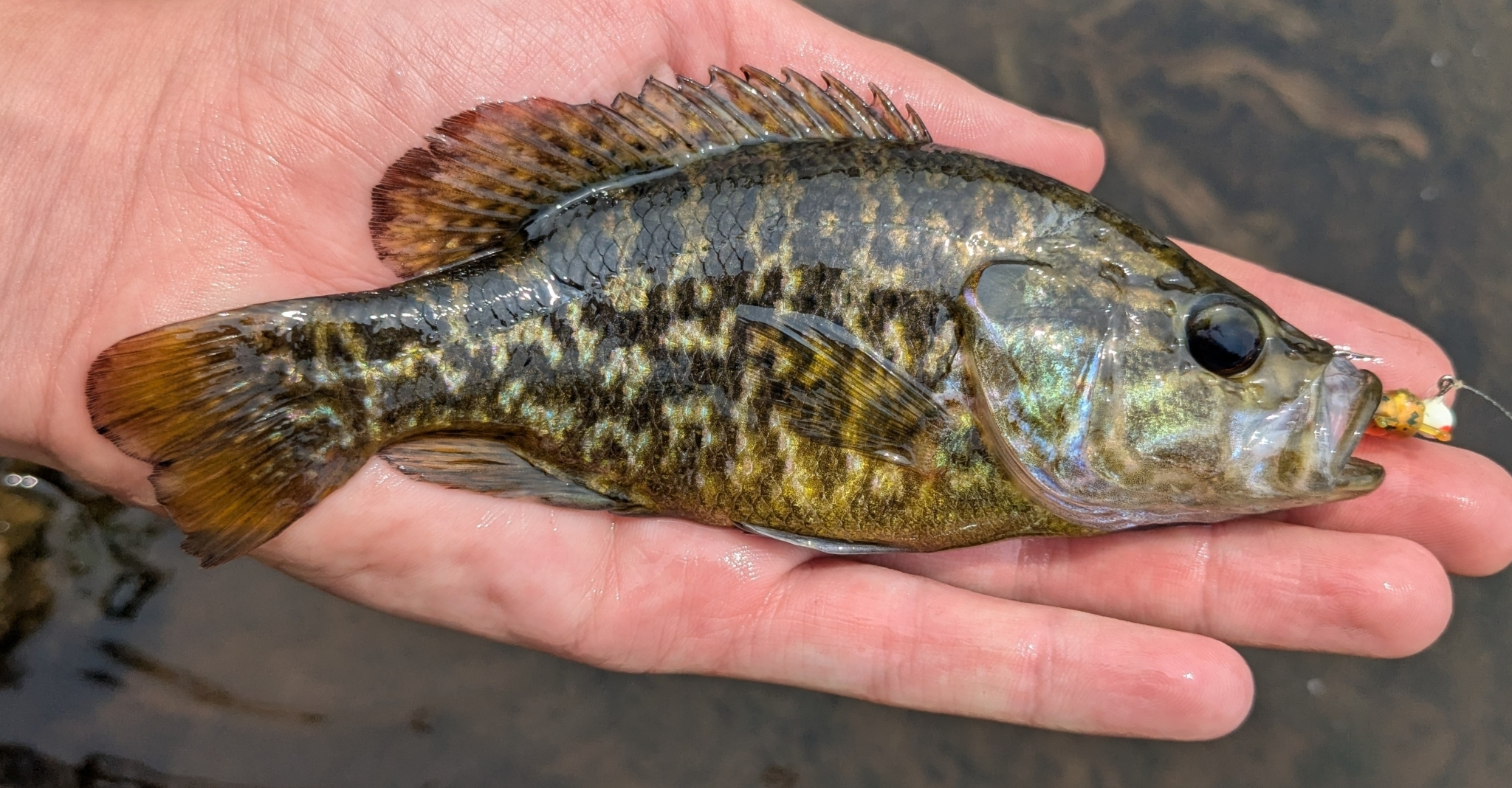

Conservation status
- Least Concern (IUCN 3.1)

- Secure (NatureServe)

Scientific classification
- Kingdom: Animalia
- Phylum: Chordata
- Class: Actinopterygii
- Division: Teleostei
- Order: Centrarchiformes
- Family: Centrarchidae
- Genus: Lepomis
- Species: L. gulosus

Binomial name
- Lepomis gulosus (G. Cuvier, 1829)

Synonyms
- Pomotis gulosus Cuvier, 1829; Chaenobryttus gulosus (Cuvier, 1829); Chaenobryttus coronarius (Bartram, 1791)

= Warmouth =

Species of fish

The warmouth (Lepomis gulosus) is a freshwater fish of the sunfish family (Centrarchidae) that is found throughout the eastern United States. Other local names include molly, redeye, goggle-eye, red-eyed bream, and strawberry perch.

== Description ==
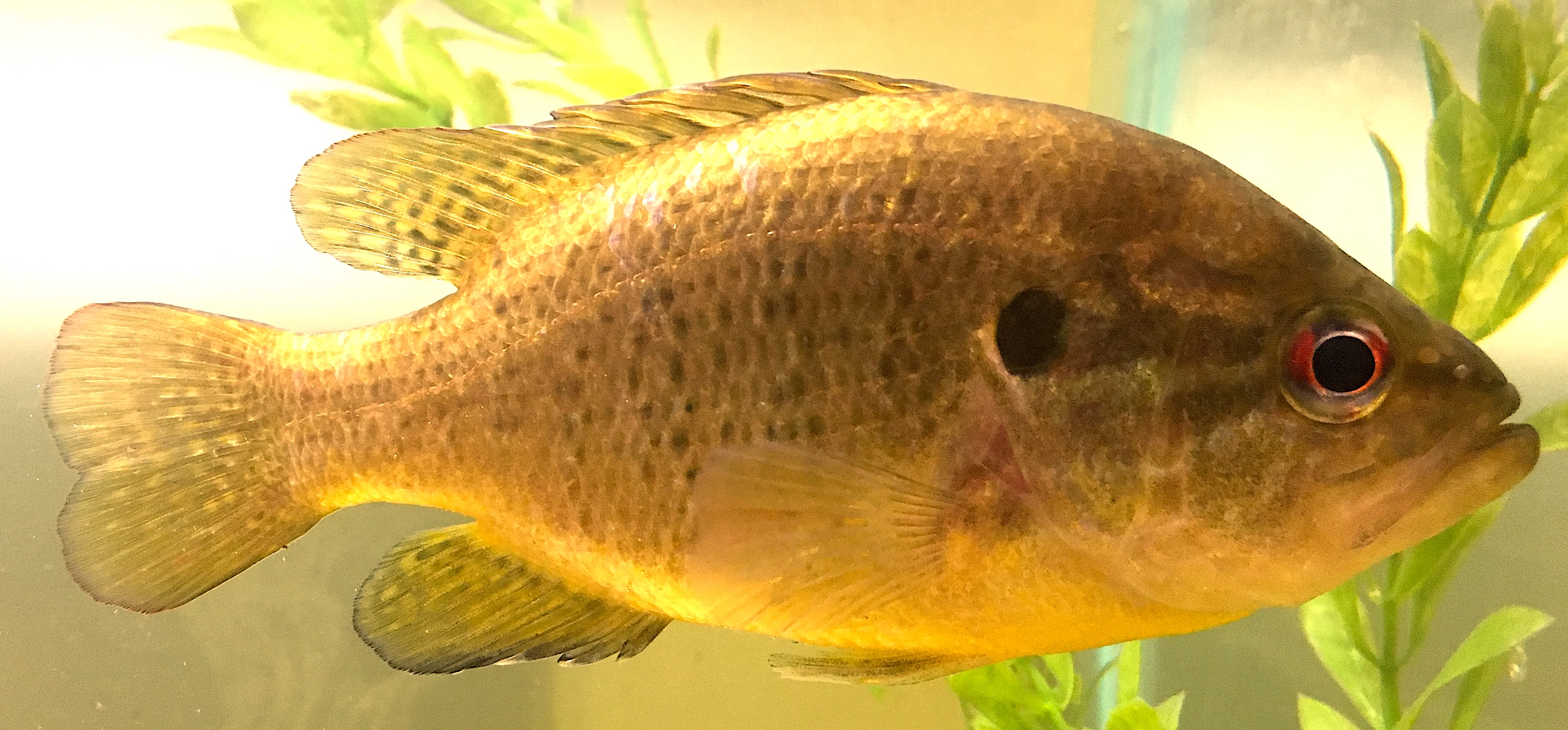
Adult warmouth from Kickapoo State Park, Illinois

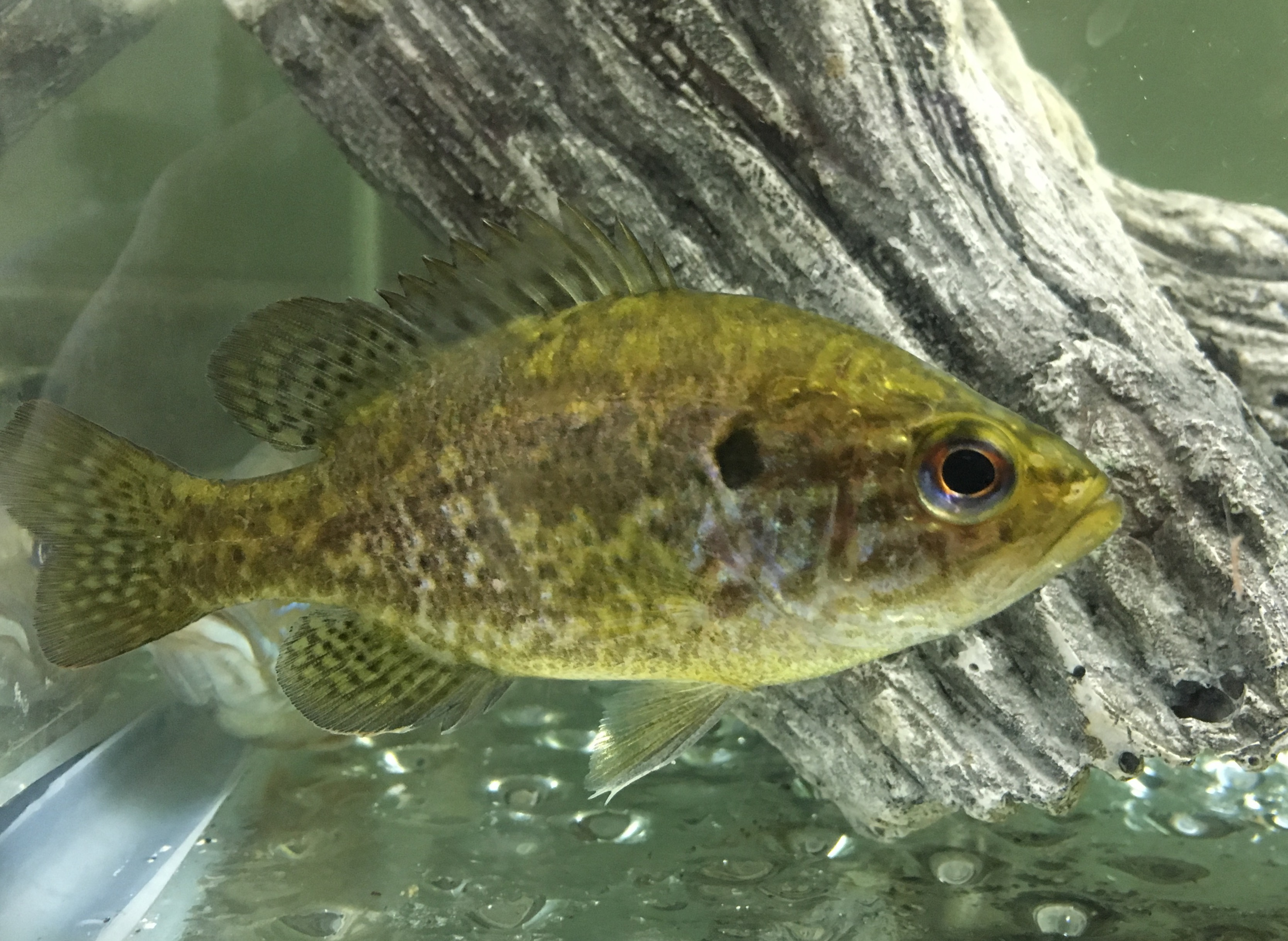
A juvenile specimen of Lepomis gulosus from Kickapoo State Park, east-central Illinois

Adult warmouth appear dusky, with a mottled brown, somewhat purplish coloration. The ventral surfaces are yellow, and the breeding male has a bright-orange spot at the base of the dorsal fin. Three to five reddish-brown streaks extend from the eyes, whose irises are reddish, a feature most pronounced in breeding males, with a red dot present on the otherwise black opercular flaps, outlined in yellow. It most commonly has three spines in the anal fin and 6 to 13 spines in the dorsal fin, with small teeth present on the tongue and palatine bones. These fish are typically 4 to 10 inches (10 to 25 centimetres) long, but can grow to over one foot (30 cm) in length, and reach 2.25 pounds (1.02 kg). The warmouth is occasionally confused with the rock bass (Ambloplites rupestris) or green sunfish (Lepomis cyanellus), both of which share its relatively large mouth and heavy body. However, the green sunfish generally has a greenish-blue vermiculate pattern on its cheeks, a black spot near the base of the dorsal and anal fins, fins that are bordered in yellowish-white and no teeth on the tongue. The rock bass has five or six spines in its anal fin as opposed to the three in the warmouth.

== Distribution ==
Warmouth are found throughout much of the south in the Mississippi River drainage, from the Gulf and Atlantic coasts and northward to the Chesapeake Bay, and westward throughout Texas to the Rio Grande, and northward into the Great Lakes Basin area. The warmouth is a highly aggressive and hardy fish, and they can live in ponds, lakes, rivers, and backwater streams and can often survive in streams with low oxygen levels where other species of sunfish cannot. The species exists with breeding populations in southern portions of Canada, and likely has existed there for many years prior to being detected.

== Ecology ==
The primary diet of the warmouth consists of insects, crayfish, and other fish. They are sight feeders, and can survive in polluted, low-oxygenated waters where other sunfish cannot, like rock bass. The largest factor affecting warmouth density and biomass in Florida's lakes is the availability of aquatic macrophytes, which allows the fish to ambush prey and use as areas to spawn. The primary diet of young warmouth is microcrustaceans and aquatic insect larvae, whereas larger specimens tend to mainly consume crayfish, freshwater shrimp, isopods, and other small fish. Their predators include larger fish, snakes, turtles, alligators, and birds. The primary habitats the warmouth occupies are areas with ample vegetation as cover with slower-moving water, often around stumps, brush piles, and other dense entanglements that allow the warmouth the ability to ambush prey, yet escape larger predators that may threaten them.

== Life history ==
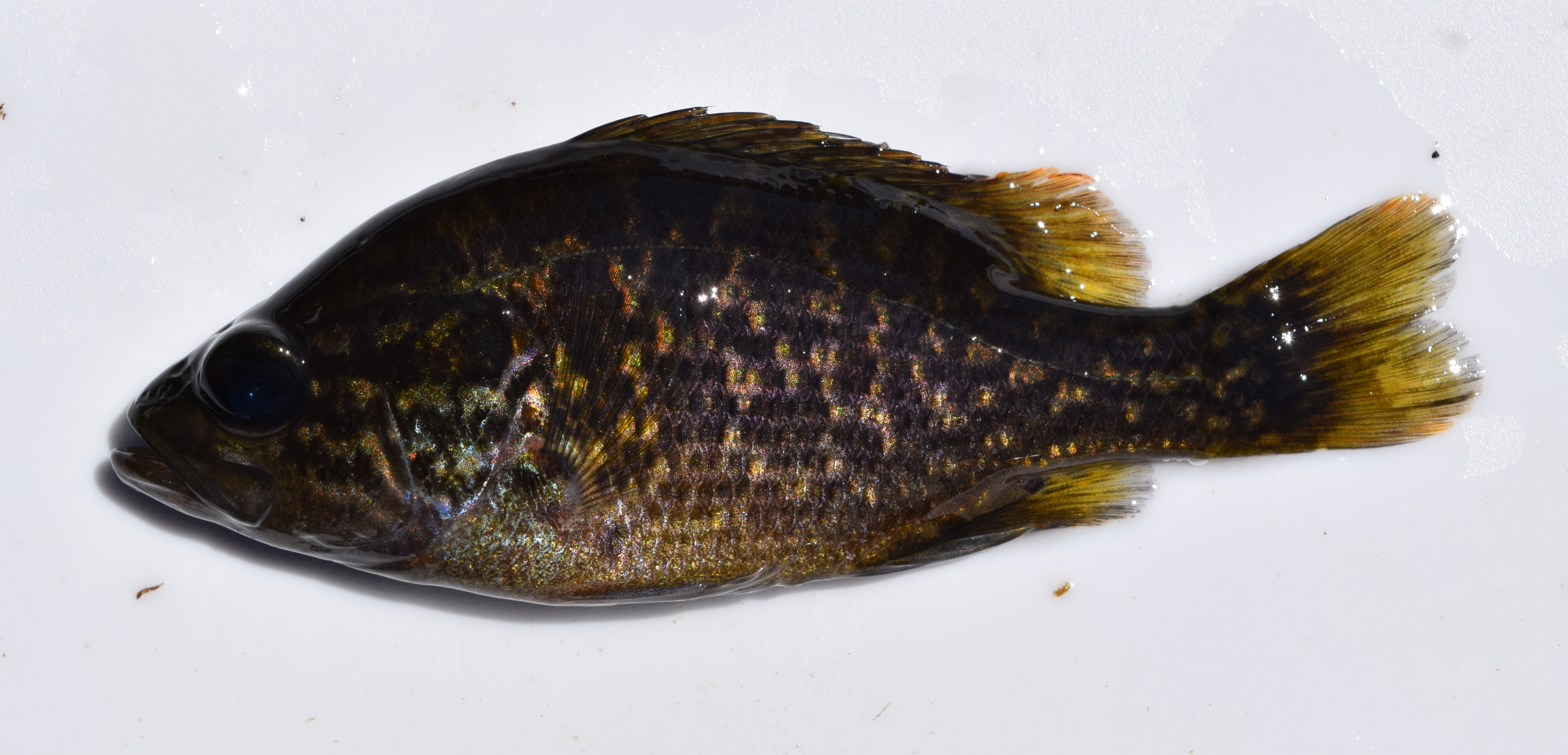
A warmouth in Mississippi

Spawning for the warmouth begins usually begins when water temperatures reach 21.1 °C (70.0 °F). Their spawning often begins in May and lasts until July. Nests are primarily constructed on rock or gravel substrates, usually located in or near to some type of structure in the water column. Unlike most other Lepomis species, the warmouth does not nest in a colony unless ideal nesting habitat is limited. When in breeding condition, the males' eyes turn red. After the female lays her eggs, the male fertilizes the eggs and aggressively defends the nest, eggs and fry from any intruder-including other females. Males are most commonly found defending the nest for up to five days later until the fry have hatched. Young warmouth spend most of their time hiding under benthic substrate available to avoid predators. Most are considered sexually mature after one year, but often the size of a fish indicates its maturity rather than time. Males usually grow faster than females. Different habitat conditions also reflect the lifespan of the warmouth, which varies from three to eight years.

The warmouth is an extremely adaptable species that can survive in many different conditions, in many river systems east of the Rocky Mountains. Often, the warmouth prefers habitats where there is slower-moving water. The most common cause of concern for the warmouth is hybridization with other Lepomis spp. that often inhabit the same areas as the warmouth. The species known to hybridize with it are the green sunfish (L. cyanellus) and the bluegill (L. macrochirus), as well as the largemouth bass (Micropterus salmoides) and the black crappie (Pomoxis nigromaculatus). This does not seem to affect the overall health or longevity of the species.

Since warmouths are not migratory fish, their populations should be relatively easily monitored throughout much of their existing ranges. According to Warren, there is no threat or current concern for the warmouth.

== IGFA records ==
The International Game Fish Association (IGFA) all tackle world record for the species stands at 1.10 kg (2 lb 7 oz) caught in Holt, Florida, in 1985.
