= Roger Feneley =

English urologist

Roger Feneley FRCS (19 October 1933 – 6 June 2018) was an English urologist who pioneered the development of new types of catheter.

Feneley published over 100 peer-reviewed articles in medical journals, including four after the age of 80.
