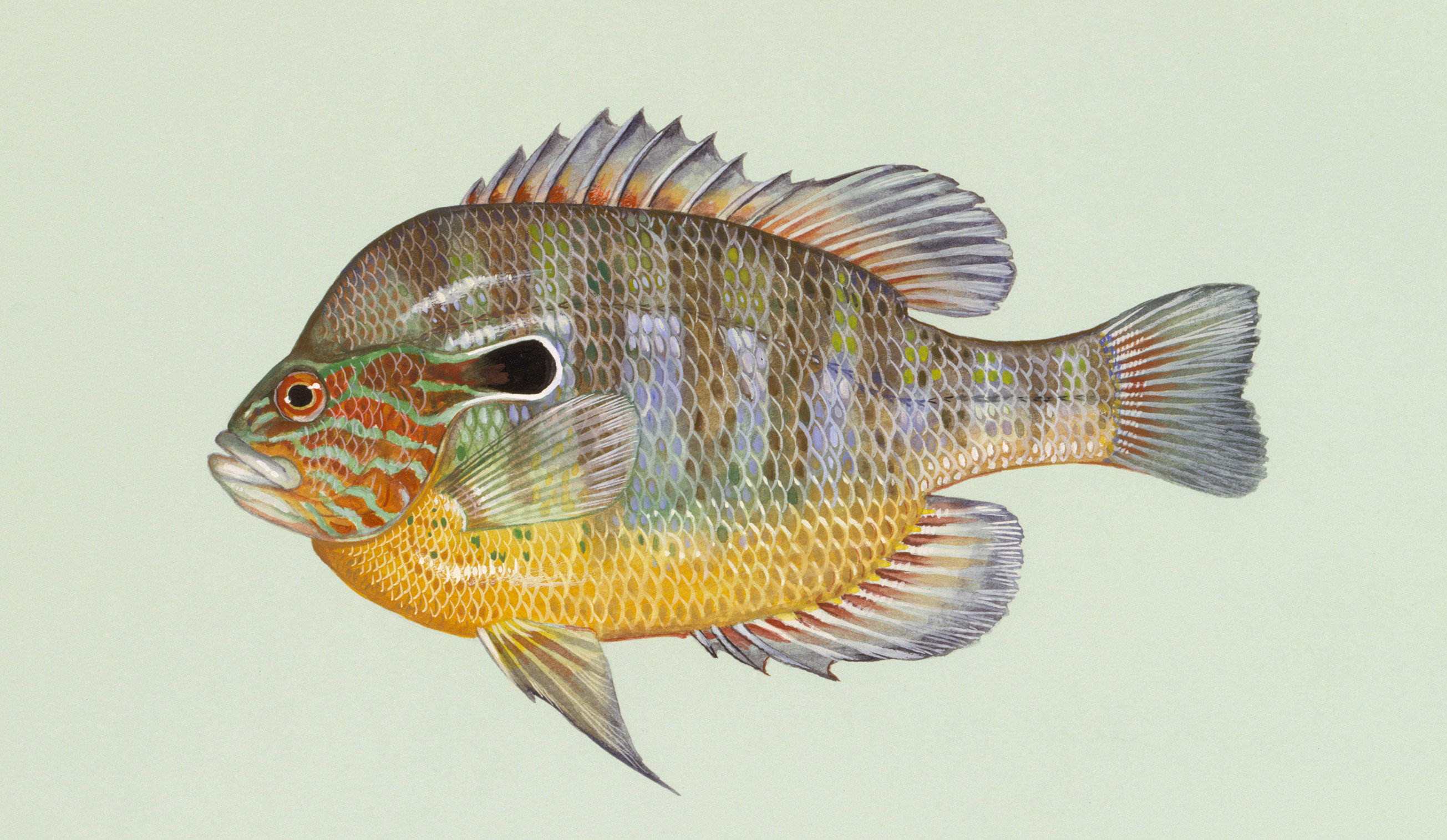

Conservation status
- Least Concern (IUCN 3.1)

Scientific classification
- Kingdom: Animalia
- Phylum: Chordata
- Class: Actinopterygii
- Order: Centrarchiformes
- Family: Centrarchidae
- Genus: Lepomis
- Species: L. megalotis

Binomial name
- Lepomis megalotis (Rafinesque, 1820)
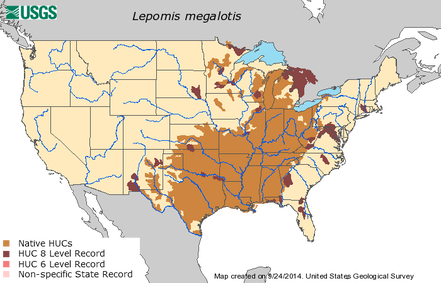

Synonyms
- Icthelis megalotis Rafinesque, 1820

= Longear sunfish =

Species of fish

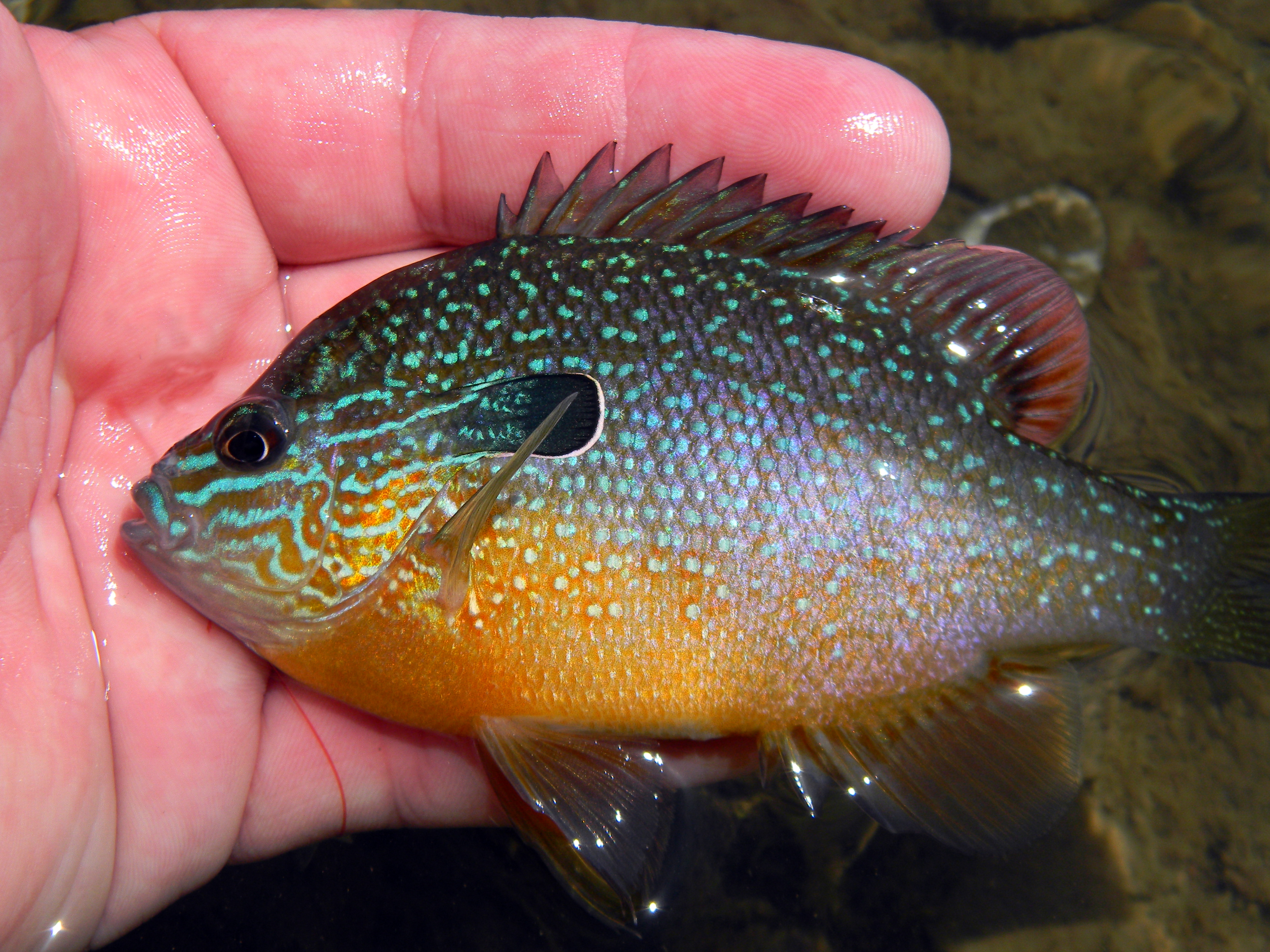
Male longear sunfish

The longear sunfish (Lepomis megalotis) is a freshwater fish in the sunfish family, Centrarchidae, of order Centrarchiformes. It is native to the area of eastern North America stretching from the Great Lakes down to northeastern Mexico. The longear sunfish reaches a maximum recorded length of about 24 cm (9.4 in), with a maximum recorded weight of 790 g (1.74 lb). Most do not live beyond six years. The longear sunfish is quite colorful, with an olive to rusty-brown back, bright orange belly and vermiculate blue-green bars on the sides of its head, the latter two features most pronounced in breeding males. A unique characteristic of longear sunfish is their elongated operculum flap, giving an appearance of a "long ear". It is black and often has a white margin. The pectoral fin is relatively short and would not reach the snout if it were reflected anteriorly. In breeding males, iridescent blue spots develop on the dorsum and sides and the fin membranes turn orange in all fins except the ventral ones, which may be blue to black, and the pectoral ones. Lepomis megalotis can be distinguished from closely related dollar sunfish L. marginatus by a greater number of cheek scale rows, by having one to two additional pectoral fin rays and by the slope of the opercular flap, which is distinctly upward in L. marginatus but is closer to horizontal in males of L. megalotis, although female and subadult L. megalotis may have upward slanting opercular flaps.

The species prefers densely vegetated, shallow waters in lakes, ponds, and sluggish streams. Its diet can include insects, aquatic invertebrates, and small fish. Avoiding strong currents, longear sunfish are usually present in small to moderate flowing streams, rivers, and reservoirs. The genus Lepomis has a well-characterized mating behavior where parental care is done by the male. The male makes and defends the nest, and fans the eggs to remove silt and other debris until the larvae hatch. Some longear females produce 4,000 eggs. They spawn in groups but do not form large colonies.

Longear sunfish are better at getting food in moving waters than still waters; this may explain why they are more abundant in streams than lakes. For the most part, longear sunfish are active during the day and inactive at night. There are very few conservation acts currently being performed in order to maintain the distribution and abundance of this species.

== Geographic distribution ==
Longear sunfish are found in North America, primarily in the Mississippi and Great Lakes regions. Longear sunfish are mostly found in freshwater areas west of the Appalachian Mountains. Some Lepomis populations are located as far north and west as southern Quebec and Minnesota. The species has also been spotted in places as far south and west as central Mexico and New Mexico. The species has been introduced to stream ecosystems along the eastern coast of the United States. The distribution of the longear sunfish throughout North America has not been affected since the species has been followed. This may be due to the species' ability to travel throughout large bodies of water, thus avoiding dams and man-made interferences along smaller streams. They are also able to occupy different body of water types, thus making them more resilient to a decrease in their range distribution.

== Ecology ==
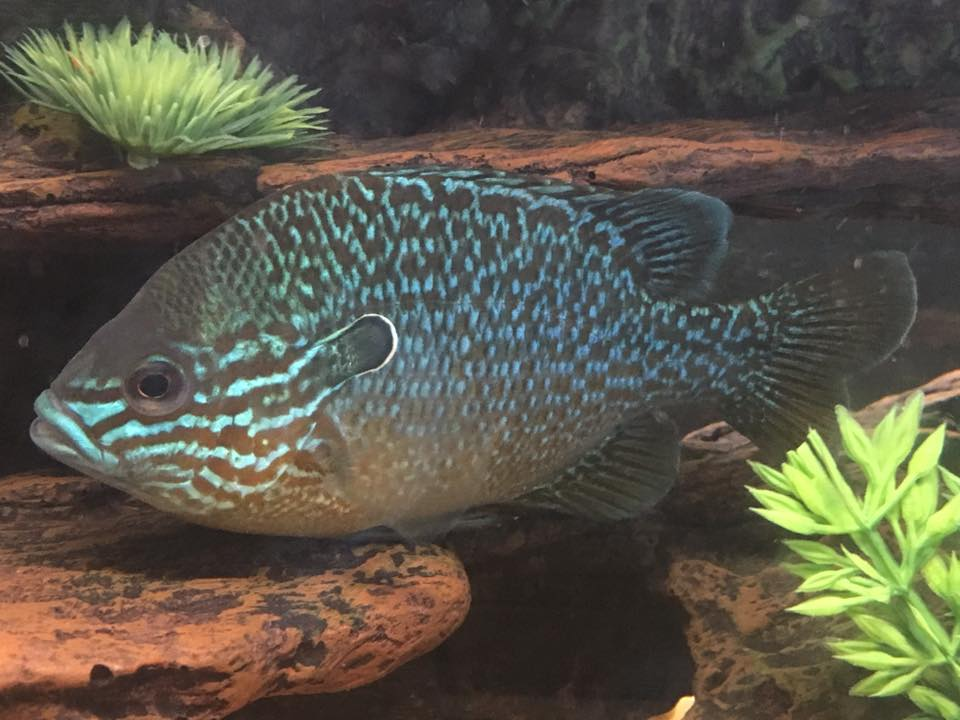
Longear sunfish from Lake Glendale, southern Illinois

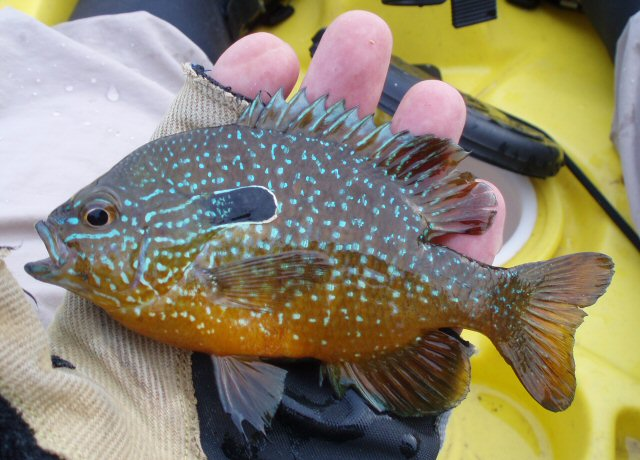
Longear sunfish from the Coosa River, Alabama

Longear sunfish feed more extensively near the surface of the water than other sunfish species. Lepomis megalotis is mostly a carnivorous fish that eats aquatic insects, small crustaceans, fish eggs, young bass, and even young sunfish. They have also been observed eating dragonflies and other insects which travel over the surface of the water. Other observed prey have been detritus, gnat larvae, snails, day flies and leeches. The diets of adult longear (longer than 102 mm) are composed of terrestrial insects (37%), fish (31%), aquatic insects (21%), and fish eggs (7%). Largemouth bass, smallmouth bass and wading birds are all natural predators to the longear sunfish. Smaller species of longear can be preyed on by larger sunfish populations. Sunfish are an important link in the food chain. They act as both predator and prey within their ecosystems. Other sunfish species and larger predatory fishes compete with the longear for food and resources.

Longear sunfish, like additional members of the family Centrarchidae, are freshwater fish. They prefer streams with a firm clay bottom or gravel with clear waters and they typically stay nearby aquatic vegetation. Although more abundant near the sources of streams, sunfish can be found in water sources of all sizes and are also found in lakes. Longear sunfish usually reside in shallower, warmer headwaters of streams with a steady flow. They spend most of their time near aquatic vegetation, or other forms of cover such as roots, brush piles, and undercut banks. This allows for them to hide from potential predators. Sunfish species are especially intolerant to turbid waters. Human-induced changes to stream ecosystems could potentially disrupt the sunfish distribution. Destruction of aquatic vegetation from human runoff could destroy aquatic plants that are essential for the protection and cover of this species against predators. Chemical runoff into large rivers could also disturb the pH of the longear's natural ecosystem.

== Life history ==
Longear sunfish tend to breed during the late spring and early summer (late May to late August). During breeding seasons they are generally found in shallower, warmer waters near the sources of streams which have pools. Like most other members of Lepomis, longear sunfish are colonial nesters. Male longear sunfish build the nests without assistance from the females. Preferred substrate for nesting is gravel, if available, but they will build in sand or hard mud if necessary. A male longear will guard the nest territory during all phases of reproduction. The clutch size can be anywhere from 140 to 2800 eggs per reproductive cycle. After hatching, it only takes the longear sunfish two to three years to reach sexual maturity. The average life-span of the Lepomis megalotis in the wild is usually four to six years, but there have been cases where individuals have lived up to nine years. Longear sunfish cannot tolerate cloudy or mucky water. Throughout the 20th century their populations have been reduced in areas where their native streams have suffered increased cloudiness. This cloudiness could potentially be a result of human induced erosion for agriculture or industry purposes. Increased human disturbance along streams and rivers could continue to increase the reduction of longear populations due to the murkiness of rivers and streams.

== Relationship with humans ==
=== Current management ===
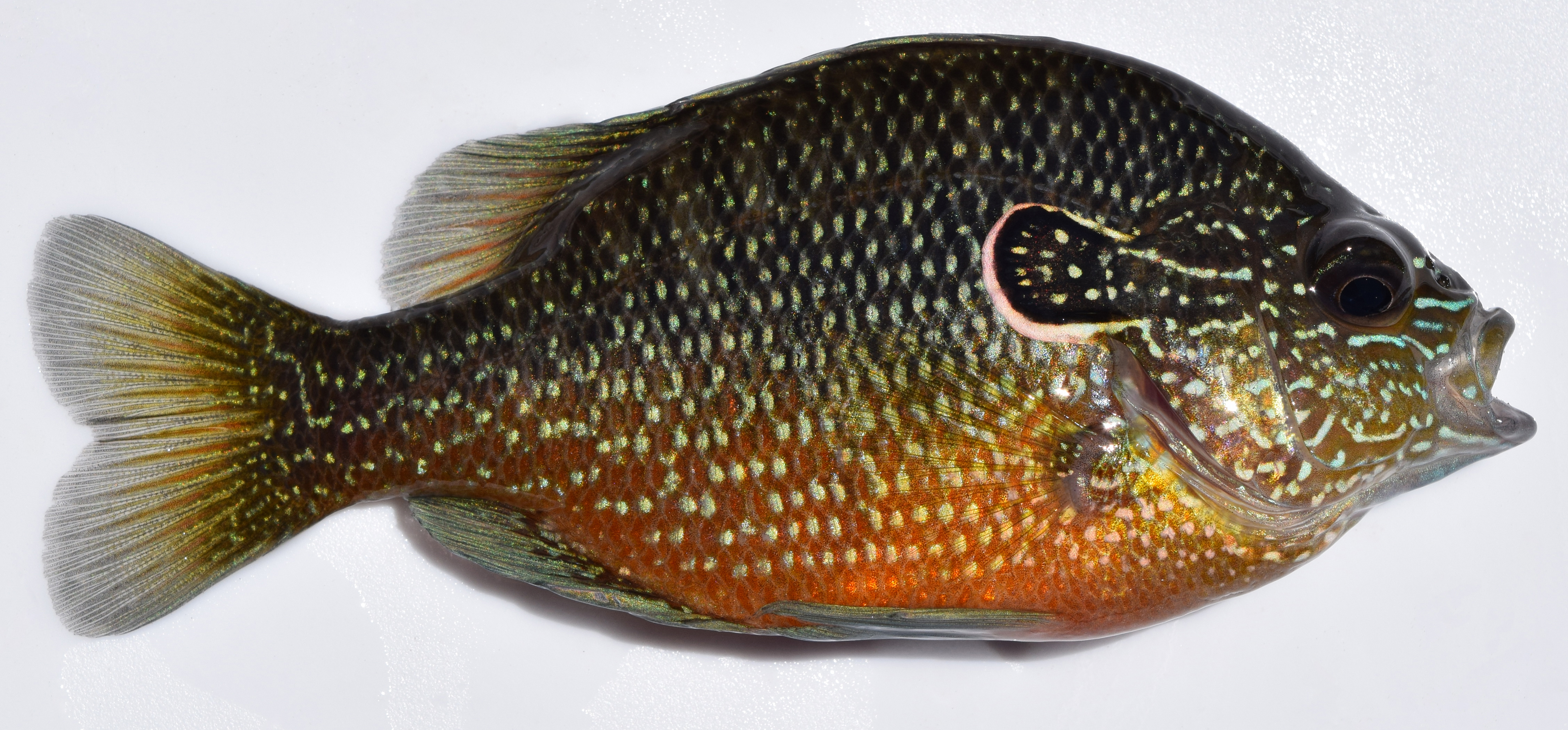
At the University of Mississippi Field Station

Longear sunfish are not currently endangered in any of their native habitats. They are not listed federally or internationally as threatened or endangered, but efforts are still being conducted in order to protect the species. Small conservation actions are taking place all over the US. Control of non-point source pollution from urbanization and agricultural practices is needed for this species, which is intolerant of turbidity. Habitat degradation and loss from shoreline and watershed agriculture threatens this species which prefers clear, shallow streams with aquatic vegetation. Sedimentation and agricultural runoff also threatens this species which is believed to have been lost from many locations because of the effects of soil erosion. The longear sunfish is not in danger of overfishing, because it is not considered a sport fish, and because the sunfish is not especially good for eating. The longear sunfish is currently threatened in states such as Wisconsin and New York. Refuge areas in these two states are being created along lakes and streams in order to protect the few, disjunct locations where this species live. Since this species has a fairly large distribution nationally and its abundance is still quite high, there are not many conservation groups taking serious action in preserving this species. The longear sunfish tends to do well in rivers and streams that do not undergo much disturbance. If man-made disturbances continue to disrupt shorelines then agencies may begin to see an increased reduction in the Lepomis megalotis abundance nationwide.

=== Angling ===
The IGFA all tackle world record for the species stands at 0.79 kg (1 lb 12 oz) caught from Elephant Butte Lake in New Mexico in 1985.

== Further references ==
- Froese, Rainer; Pauly, Daniel (eds.). "Lepomis megalotis". FishBase.
- "Lepomis megalotis". Integrated Taxonomic Information System.
- Sezen, Uzay. "Sinister Cannibals or Nurturing Fathers?". Nature Documentaries, 2012.
- Ellis, Jack (1993). The Sunfishes-A Fly Fishing Journey of Discovery. Bennington, VT: Abenaki Publishers, Inc. ISBN 978-0-936644-17-2.
- Rice, F. Philip (1964). America's Favorite Fishing-A Complete Guide to Angling for Panfish. New York: Harper Row.
- Rice, F. Philip (1984). Panfishing. New York: Stackpole Books. ISBN 978-0-943822-25-9.
- Malo, John (1981). Fly-Fishing for Panfish. Minneapolis, Minnesota: Dillon Press Inc. ISBN 978-0-87518-208-7.
- Mullaney M (2003) "Lepomis megalotis" Animal Diversity Web. Accessed 24 November 2013
