= Rowe Findley =

American journalist (1925–2003)

Cecil Rowe Findley (1925 – April 9, 2003) was an American freelance journalist best known for his work as writer and assistant editor for National Geographic magazine.

== Career ==
After graduating from the University of Missouri with a degree in journalism and serving in the United States Air Force during World War II for 36 months, Findley joined the National Geographic Society in 1959 and worked for the magazine for 31 years. He traveled more than 25,000 miles for assignments such as retracing the routes of historical photographer William Henry Jackson and the routes of the Pony Express. His article on the 1980 eruption of Mount St. Helens was voted by its readers as the most popular ever published. Findley also wrote for Missouri newspapers and the Kansas City Star for ten years. During his time at the Society, Findley wrote 18 articles and one book.

== Personal ==
He resided in Falls Church, VA, with his wife Mary Virginia until his death in April 2003. He is survived by his wife and his sons David, Stephen, and John, all of whom live in Northern Virginia.

== Bibliography ==
- Findley, Rowe; Jaeger, Edmund (1972). Great American Deserts. Washington, D.C.: National Geographic Society. ISBN 978-0-87044-107-3.
