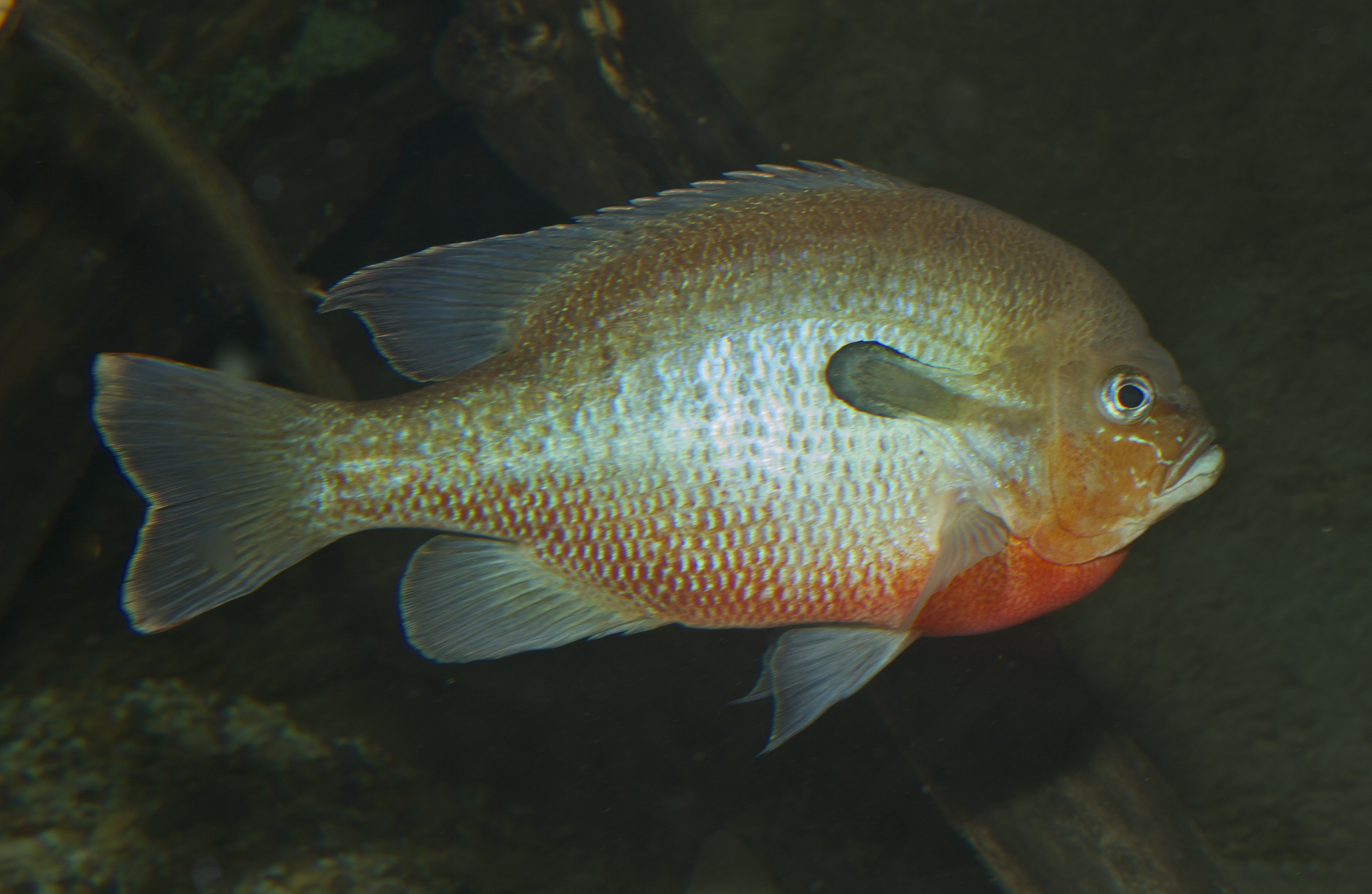
- Lepomis auritus
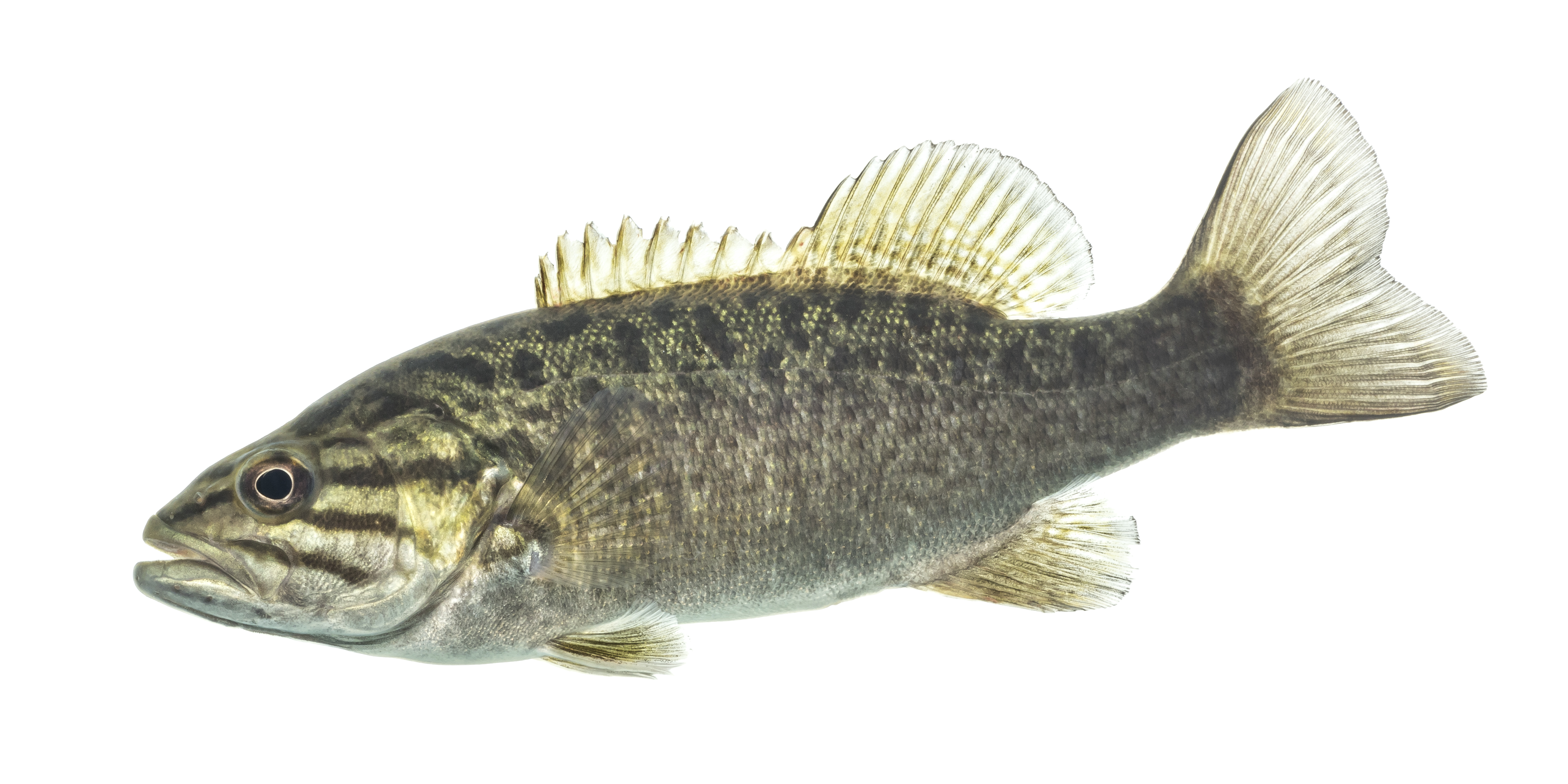
- Micropterus dolomieu

Scientific classification
- Kingdom: Animalia
- Phylum: Chordata
- Class: Actinopterygii
- Order: Centrarchiformes
- Family: Centrarchidae
- Subfamily: Lepominae; Gill, 1846

= Lepominae =

Lepominae Temporal range: Middle Miocene–present

Subfamily of ray-finned fishes

Lepominae is a subfamily of freshwater ray-finned fish, one of three subfamilies in the family Centrarchidae, the sunfishes.

== Genera ==
The following two genera are classified as being in the subfamily Lepominae:

- Lepomis Rafinesque, 1816
- Micropterus Lacépède, 1802 (Black basses)

The oldest fossils of this group are Micropterus and Lepomis specimens from the Middle Miocene. However, as centrarchine fossils are known dating back to the Early Oligocene, they likely diverged from that group much earlier.
