= Lake Findley =

- Location within Texas Location within the United States
- Location: Jim Wells County, near Alice, Texas
- Coordinates: 27°47.52′N 98°3.85′W
- Type: reservoir
- Primary inflows: Chiltipin Creek
- Primary outflows: Chiltipin Creek
- Basin countries: United States
- Surface area: 247 acres (100 ha)
- Max. depth: 12 ft (3.7 m)
- Surface elevation: 192 ft (59 m)

Lake Findley, also known as Lake Alice, is a reservoir on Chiltipin Creek about 1 mile (1.6 kilometers) north of the city of Alice, Texas. The reservoir was formed in 1965 by the construction of a dam across the creek. The dam and lake are managed by the City of Alice. Lake Findley serves as a venue for recreation, especially fishing.

== Fish and plant life ==
Lake Findley has been stocked with species of fish intended to improve the utility of the reservoir for recreational fishing. Fish present in Lake Findley include crappie, bluegill, catfish, sunfish, largemouth bass, and alligator gar.

== Recreational uses ==
The most popular recreational use of the lake is fishing.
