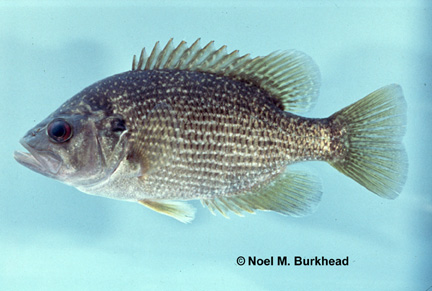

Conservation status
- Least Concern (IUCN 3.1)

- Vulnerable (NatureServe)

Scientific classification
- Kingdom: Animalia
- Phylum: Chordata
- Class: Actinopterygii
- Order: Centrarchiformes
- Family: Centrarchidae
- Genus: Ambloplites
- Species: A. cavifrons

Binomial name
- Ambloplites cavifrons Cope, 1868

= Roanoke bass =

Species of fish

The Roanoke bass (Ambloplites cavifrons) is a species of freshwater fish in the sunfish family (Centrarchidae) of order Centrarchiformes. This species is endemic to rivers in the eastern United States, where it is native only to the states of Virginia and North Carolina.

== Description ==
Roanoke bass have a robust, compressed body with a large, terminal mouth and a nearly scaleless cheek. The anal fin has a dark margin, the pectoral fin is rounded and the caudal fin is emarginate. The eye is large and red contrasting with the dark brown or olive colour of the body.

The Roanoke bass closely resembles the rock bass (Ambloplites rupestris) and the two are easily and often confused notwithstanding different coloring. The Roanoke bass is dark, olive green to olive brown on the back, fading to grayish on the flanks and white on the underside. The spots on its scales are smaller than those of rock bass and they have paler small whitish or yellowish spots on the upper body. The forehead is slightly concave and this and the paucity of scales on the cheek also distinguishes the Roanoke bass. The maximum published total length for this species is 36 centimeters (14 in) and the maximum weight is 620 grams (1.37 lb).

== Distribution ==
Roanoke bass are native to a few river systems in Virginia and North Carolina on the Atlantic seaboard of the United States. Its range covers the Chowan, Roanoke, Tar, Neuse, and Cape Fear drainage systems but it has seemingly been extirpated from the extreme upper reaches of the Roanoke system. Historical introductions into the middle New River and upper and lower James River drainages for sportfishing did not produce viable populations.

== Habitat and biology ==
Roanoke bass are found in large creeks, streams and small rivers where they prefer clear waters, although some turbidity may be tolerated, as well as in darker stained waters originating from swamps found in rivers such as the Nottoway and Blackwater. They are most frequently recorded in quite deep, fast flowing runs and around rocks and gravel, or at the heads of pools. They are predatory fish which feed in a wide variety of animals such as insects, worms, leeches and crayfish, as well as smaller fish like fathead minnows, golden shiners and gizzard shad. In captivity, the males built and guarded nests in shallow water on gravel, sandy and muddy substrates were avoided.

== Conservation ==
Roanoke bass have been assessed by the IUCN as being of least concern but NatureServe assesses the species as vulnerable and states that due to habitat degradation together with hybridization and competition from introduced rock bass the species has declined.

Ambloplites cavifrons is a species of special concern in Virginia and is listed by the North Carolina Natural Heritage Program as "significantly rare".

== Relationship with humans ==
The IGFA all-tackle world record for the species stands at 2 lb 5 oz (1.05 kg) caught in the Dan River in Virginia in 2024.
