= Panfish =

Pan-sized freshwater fish

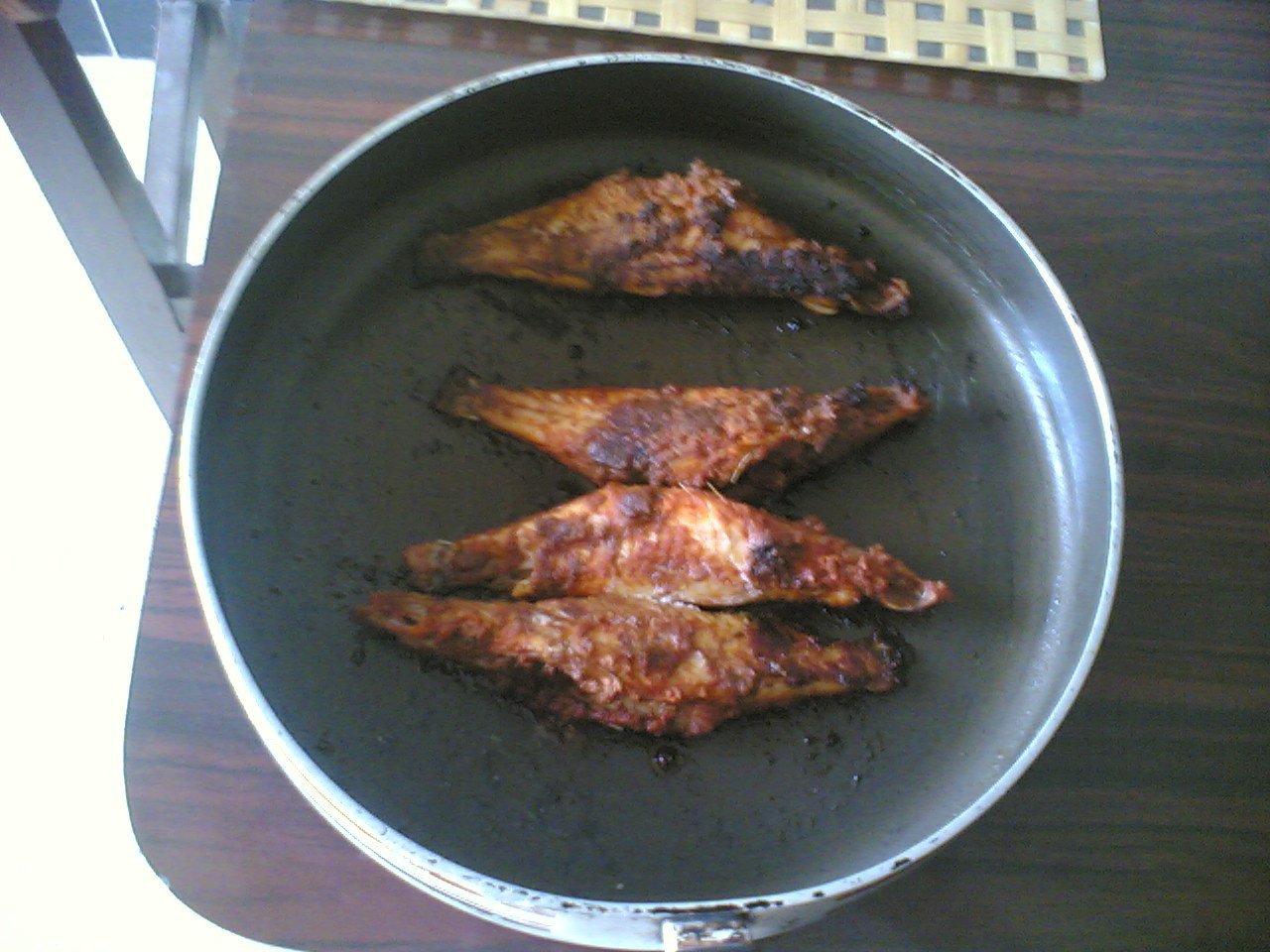
Pan-fried fish

The word panfish, also spelled pan-fish or pan fish, is an American English term describing any edible freshwater fish that usually do not outgrow the size of an average frying pan. It is also commonly used by recreational anglers to refer to any small game fish that can fit wholly into a pan for cooking but are still large enough to be legal. According to the Oxford English Dictionary, the term was first recorded in 1796 in American Cookery, the first known cookbook written by an American author.

== Usage ==
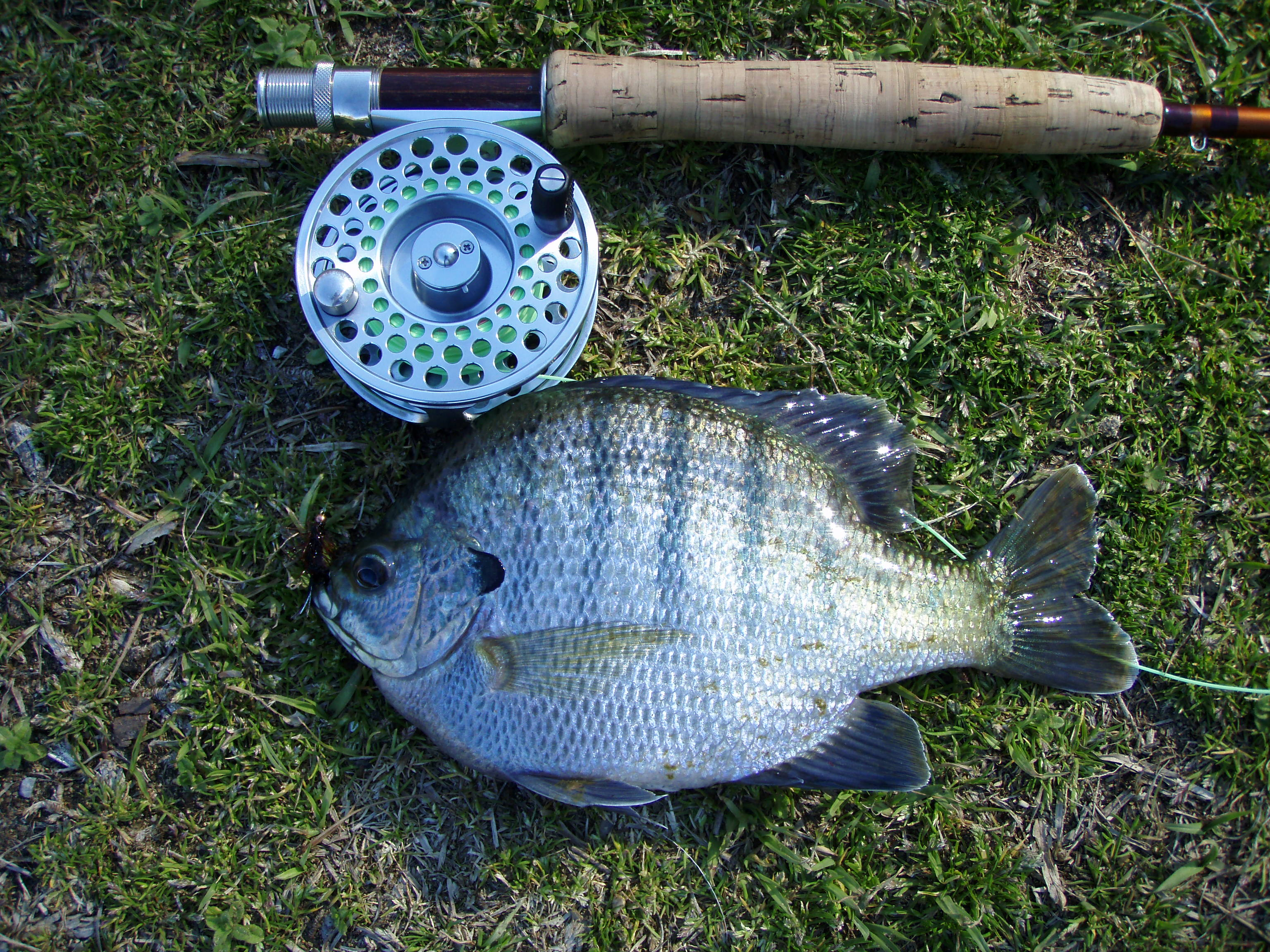
A typical panfish, a bluegill from an Alabama farm pond.

The term panfish or pan-fish has been used to refer to a wide range of edible freshwater and saltwater fish species that are small enough to cook whole in one frying pan. The fish species that match this definition and usage vary according to geography. One early-20th-century source identifies all the following as panfish: yellow perch, candlefish, balaos, sand launces, rock bass, bullheads, minnows, Rocky Mountain whitefish, sand rollers, crappie, yellow bass, white bass, croaker and most of the common small sunfishes such as bluegill and redear sunfish.

Here is one example:

As a pan-fish we do not know of any better among American freshwater fishes. We have experimented with the yellow perch and several other species, including both species of black bass, the bluegill, wall-eyed pike, and rock-bass, eating each for several days in succession, and found the yellow perch the sweetest and most delicious of them all. One does not tire of it so soon as of the other kinds. Several other persons who tried the same experiment reached the same conclusion. In most parts of its range it is highly esteemed, and in many places it is of very considerable commercial importance. In the Great Lakes, the Potomac River, and the small lakes in the upper Mississippi Valley large quantities are taken, which always find a ready sale.

The following is a typical example of the term as it was commonly used in cooking taken from The White House Cookbook compiled by Hugo Ziemann, chief kitchen steward in the White House in 1901:

TO FRY FISH – Most of the smaller fish (generally termed pan-fish) are usually fried. Clean well, cut off the head, and, if quite large, cut out the backbone, and slice the body crosswise into five or six pieces; season with salt and pepper. Dip in Indian meal or wheat flour, or in beaten egg, and roll in bread or fine cracker crumbs. Trout and perch should not be dipped in meal; put into a thick bottomed iron frying pan, the flesh side down, with hot lard or drippings; fry slowly, turning when lightly browned. PAN-FISH. Place them in a thick bottomed frying pan with heads all one way. Fill the spaces with smaller fish. When they are fried quite brown and ready to turn, put a dinner plate over them, drain off the fat; then invert the pan, and they will be left unbroken on the plate. Put the lard back into the pan, and when hot slip back the fish. When the other side is brown, drain, turn on a plate as before, and slip them on a warm platter, to be sent to the table. Leaving the heads on and the fish a crispy-brown, in perfect shape, improves the appearance if not the flavor. Garnish with slices of lemon.

In most angling literature, members of the freshwater family Centrarchidae (also called sunfishes) are the target species most likely to be called panfish. They include:

- Lepomis, including
  - Bluegill (Lepomis macrochirus)
  - Green sunfish (Lepomis cyanellus)
  - Redear sunfish (Lepomis microlophus)
  - Redbreast sunfish (Lepomis auritus)
  - Spotted sunfish (Lepomis punctatus)
  - Pumpkinseed (Lepomis gibbosus)
  - Warmouth (Chaenobryttus gulosus)
- Crappie, including
  - White crappie (Pomoxis annularis)
  - Black crappie (Pomoxis nigromaculatus)
- Centrarchus
  - Flier (Centrarchus macropterus)

The term panfish may also be used for members of Percidae families, such as:

- Perch, including
  - European perch (Perca fluviatilis)
  - Yellow perch (Perca flavescens)
  - Balkhash perch (Perca schrenkii)
- Gymnocephalus
  - Ruffe (Gymnocephalus cernua)

The term panfish may also be used for members of other families, such as:

- Creek chub (Semotilus sp.)
- Cutlips minnow (Exoglossum maxillingua)
- European bullhead (Cottus gobio)
- Dark sleeper (Odontobutis obscura)
- Three-lips (Opsariichthys uncirostris)

== See also ==
- Game fish
- Rough fish
