= Troth =

Troth may refer to:

- An alternate form of truth, especially in the medieval sense
- Troth (surname)
- Troth Yeddha', a landform in the Fairbanks North Star Borough, Alaska
- The Troth, an American Asatru organization
- Troth's Fortune, a historic home in Easton, Maryland, United States
