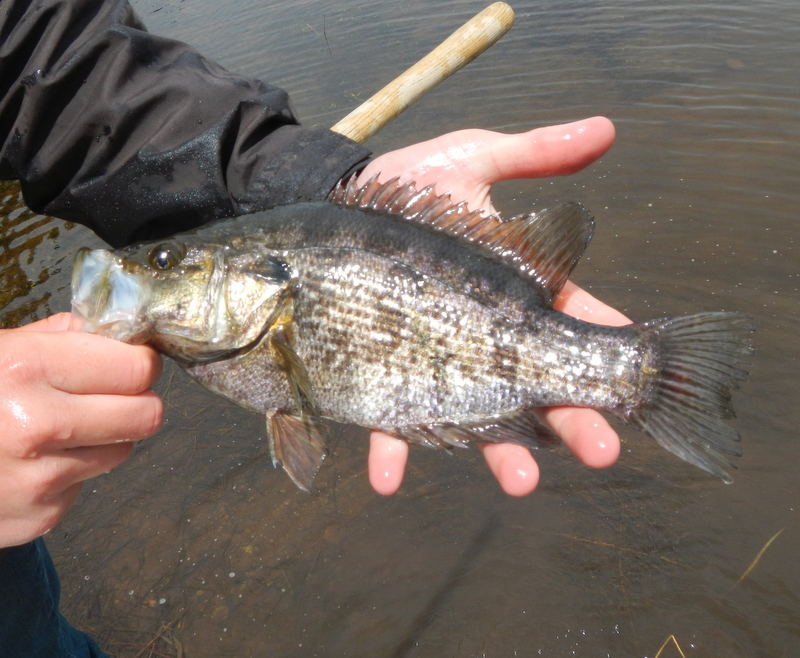

Conservation status
- Endangered (IUCN 3.1)

Scientific classification
- Kingdom: Animalia
- Phylum: Chordata
- Class: Actinopterygii
- Order: Centrarchiformes
- Family: Centrarchidae
- Genus: Archoplites; Gill, 1861
- Species: A. interruptus

Binomial name
- Archoplites interruptus (Girard, 1854)

Synonyms
- Centrarchus interruptus Girard, 1854; Centrarchus maculosus Ayres, 1854

= Sacramento perch =

Sacramento perch Temporal range: Middle Miocene to present

Species of fish

The Sacramento perch (Archoplites interruptus) is a species of freshwater sunfish endemic to California, and transplanted to other parts of the western United States. It is the only extant species within the genus Archoplites. It is the only species of freshwater sunfish whose native habitat resides west of the Rocky Mountains, while all the other species are native to the east. Due its small range and the impact of introduced species on it, it is considered Endangered on the IUCN Red List.

They are indigenous to the Sacramento–San Joaquin River Delta, Pajaro, and Salinas River areas but have been widely introduced outside their native range throughout California. They have also been introduced outside of the state, in Nebraska, Nevada, Oregon, Utah, Colorado, Arizona, New Mexico, South Dakota, North Dakota, and Texas, to revive their populations. While there is no updated analysis of their populations in these states, it is certain that they still exist throughout California. However, there is speculation of viable populations in Utah, Nevada, and Colorado. The Sacramento perch's native habitat is in sluggish, heavily vegetated waters of sloughs and lakes. It can reach a maximum overall length of 73 cm (29 in) and a maximum weight of 1.4 kg (3.1 lb), and it has been reported to live as long as nine years. Its adaptability to different habitats is variable, and it can survive on various food sources, from insects, bottom-dwelling snails, phytoplankton, and small fishes. As young perch, they consume mainly small crustaceans and eventually move on to insect larvae and then smaller fish as adults.

== Taxonomy ==
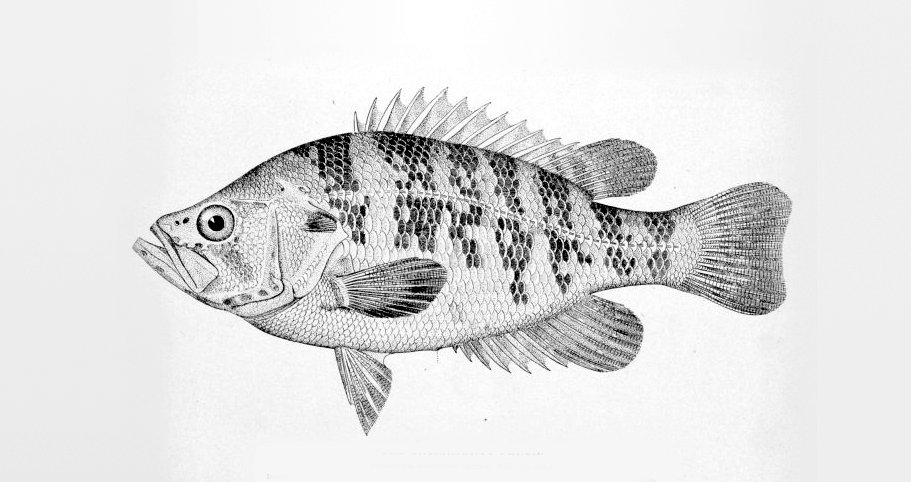
Illustration

Archoplites interruptus belongs to the family Centrarchidae, within the order Centrarchiformes. Although called the Sacramento perch, A. interruptus is not a perch strictly speaking. The perches are members of the genus Perca in the family Percidae. Being the only native centrarchid west of the Rockies, the Sacramento perch is believed to closely resemble the ancestral fish that split from the rest of the other species residing in the east. This split was believed to occurred during the Middle Miocene period, which is about 15.5 to 5.2 MYA. It was initially thought that the Sacramento perches' close relatives were the flier (Centrarchus macropterus) and crappies (Pomoxis spp.). However, a reevaluation of this using DNA sequences shows that it is most closely related to the Rock Bass.

A. interruptus is currently the only species of the genus Archoplites, but Girard, an ichthyologist, originally assigned it to Centrarchus. The genus name comes from the Greek words that mean anus and armor, which refers to the anal spines. The species name, interruptus, refers to the irregular stripe pattern on its sides.

In addition to the extant A. interruptus, four extinct species are known from fossil remains:

- †Archoplites clarki Smith & Miller, 1985 (Middle Miocene of Clarkia fossil beds, Idaho)
- †Archoplites langrellorum Van Tassel & Smith, 2019 (Pliocene of eastern Oregon)
- †Archoplites molarus Smith, Morgan & Gustafson, 2000 (Early to Late Pliocene of the Ringold Formation, Washington)
- †Archoplites taylori Miller & Smith, 1967 (Late Miocene of Idaho, including Poison Creek Formation)

The earliest fossils of the extant A. interruptus itself are from the Early Pleistocene-aged Cache Formation of California.

== Description ==
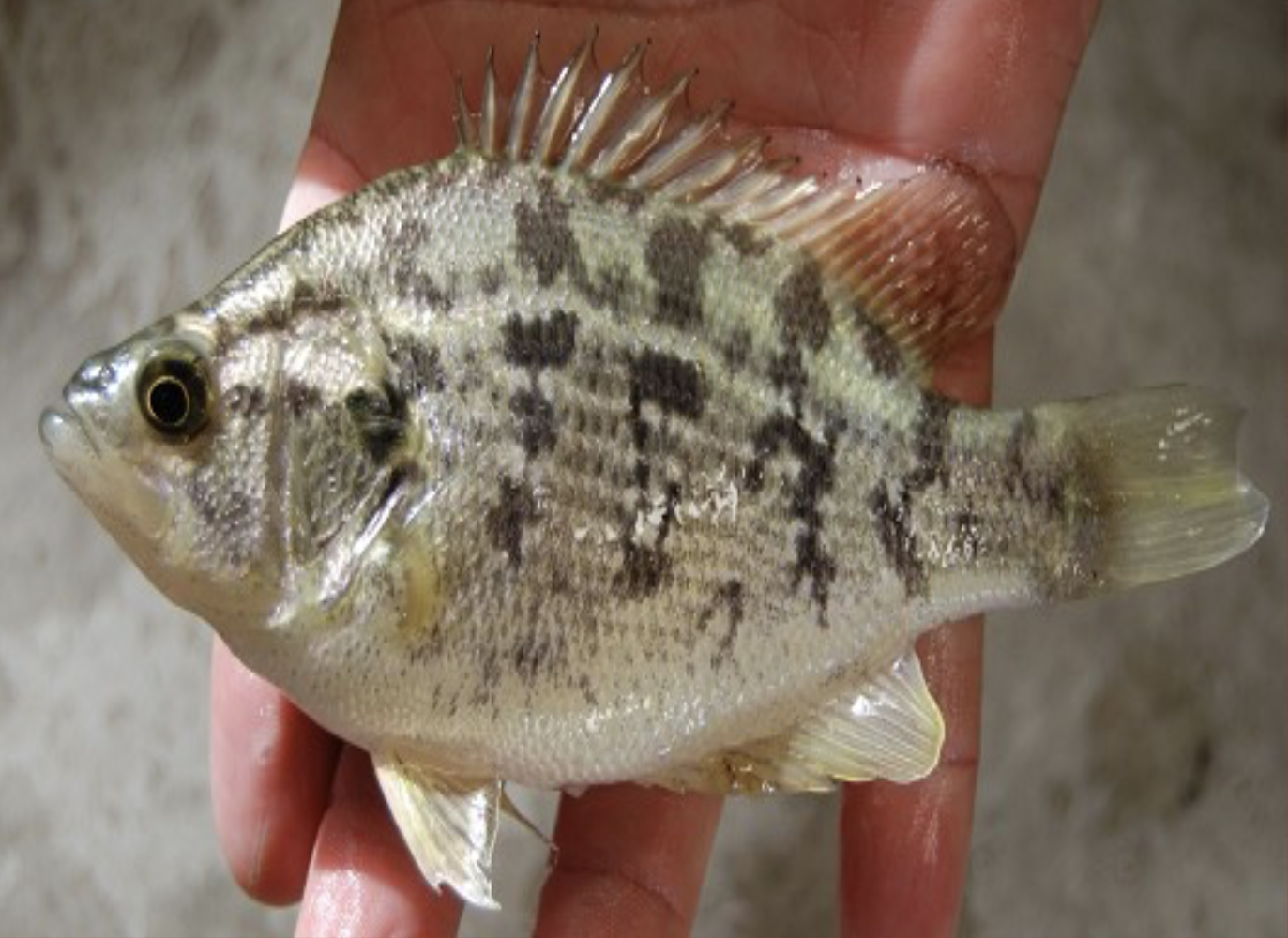
Typical Sacramento perch coloration, with irregular vertical strip bar patterning along the side.

The body shape of this fish is laterally compressed, and it is considered to be deep-bodied for a Centrarchid species. Being deep-bodied refers to it being wide in length from its ventral to dorsal side. On average, its depth is 2.5 times greater than the average length of all other Centrarchids. This fish has a slightly angled mouth in the superior position, indicating that it feeds on insects near the middle of the water column. The mouth is large, with numerous small teeth found on its jaws, tongue, and roof of its mouth. The dorsal fin has a strictly spiny portion with about 12–14 spines that is continuous, with the soft-rayed portion that has 10–11 spines. It has fairly large cycloid scales numerously ranging from 38 to 48 along the lateral line in an adult. It has a combination of white, silver, and dark brown colored scales.

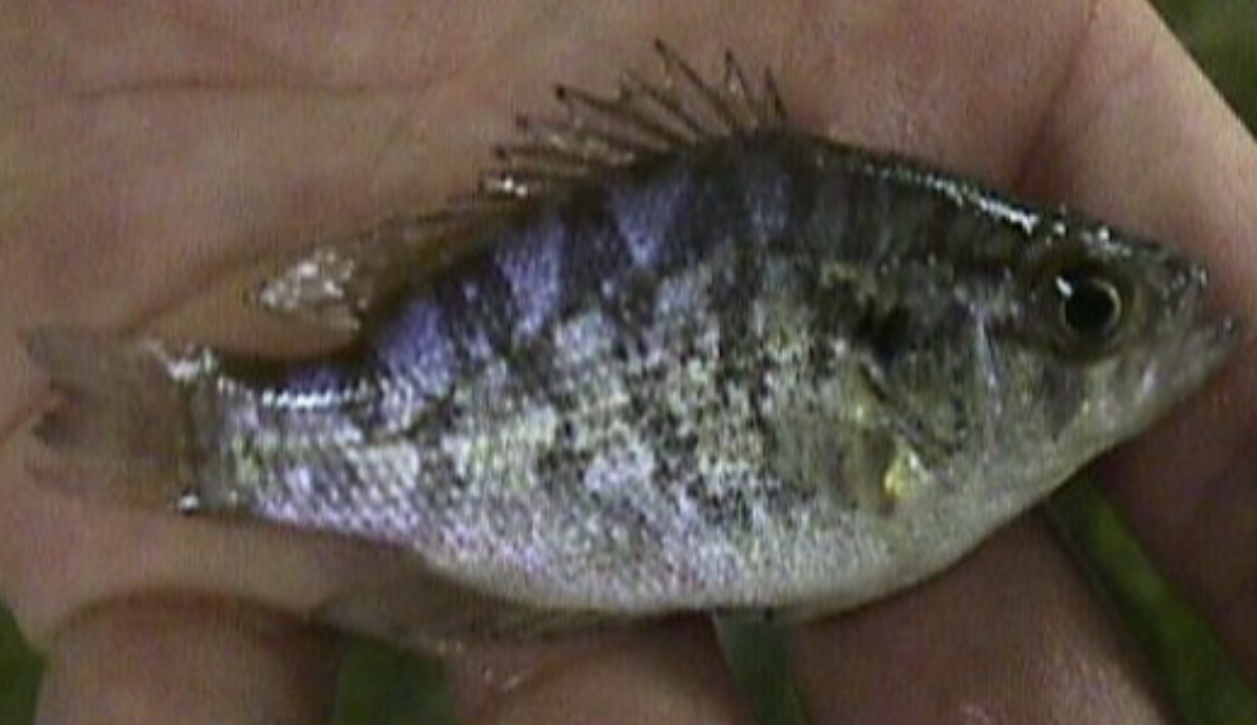
Dark green-purple metallic coloration in male perches during the breeding season.

The Sacramento perch is most identifiable by its irregular dark brown vertical bars that almost resemble stripes, giving it great cryptic coloration in dark and vertically broken-up habitats provided by aquatic plants. The females, however, tend to have these bars less prominent and have more of an even coloration with the silver scales. There are about 25–30 gill rakers in its gills, and has black spots on the operculum. During the breeding season, there tends to be more sexual dimorphism. Overall, the males become darker with metallic green-purple scales and display purple opercula, as shown in the right image.

The color in females is plainer with spotted opercula. Its size is dependent on how old the fish is. A Sacramento perch at age one would measure 6–13 cm, at age two it would be 12–19 cm, and the growth rate will begin to slow. The largest of this species ever recorded was 73 cm total length.

== Distribution ==
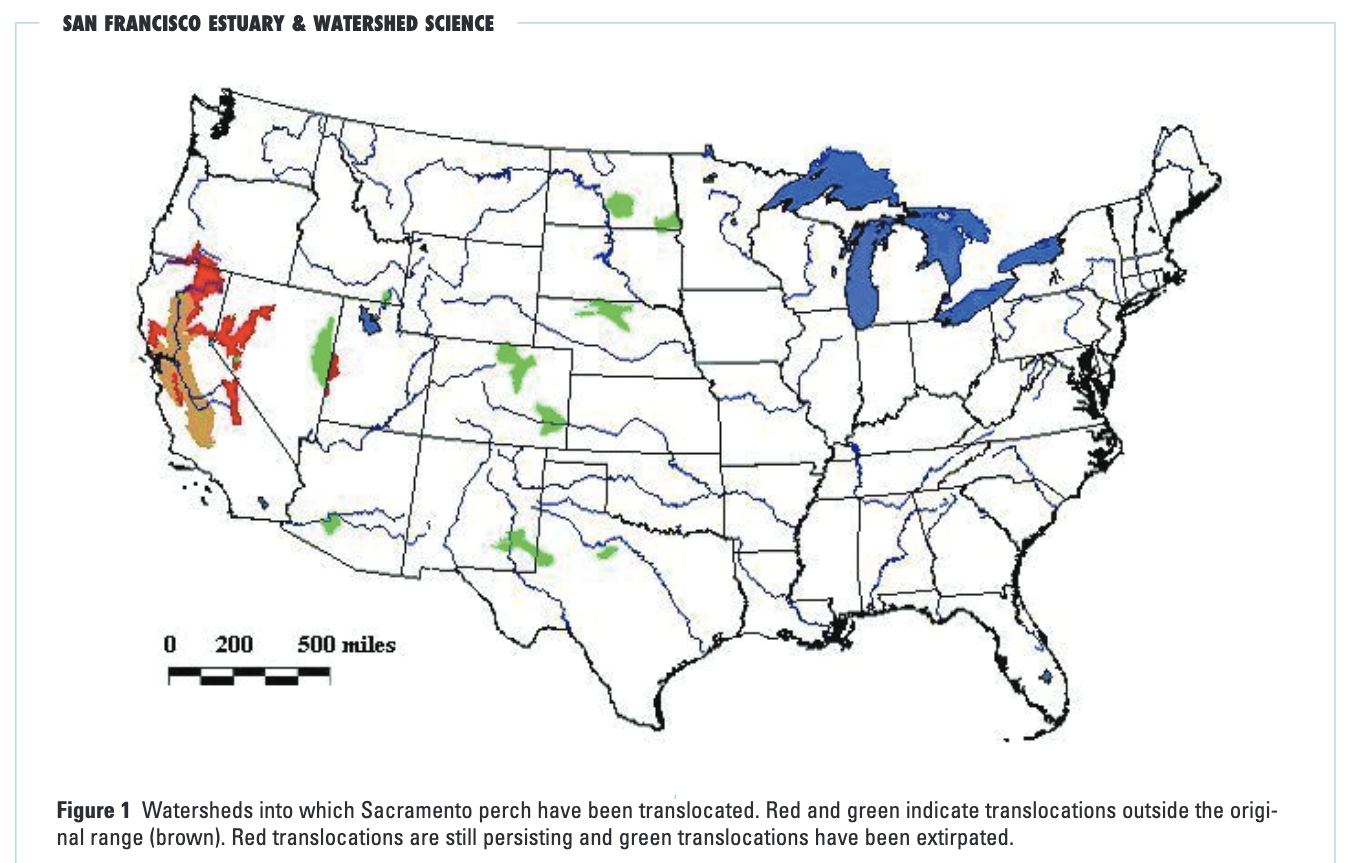
Geographic distribution of the Sacramento perch.

Historically, the Sacramento perch was found throughout the Central Valley of California at elevations below 100 m. The Sacramento perch was very popular for recreational fishing. It was so abundant that this species was commonly used as a food fish eaten regularly. It inhabited sloughs, slow-moving rivers of the Pajaro and Salinas rivers, and lakes with emergent vegetation such as Clear Lake. This species has been eliminated from 90% of its natural habitat due to habitat destruction, egg predation by invasive fish species, and interspecific competition with other centrarchids, mainly bluegill. Sacramento perch are quite rare in their native range and are found primarily in warm, turbid, and alkaline farm ponds, reservoirs, and recreational lakes that it has been introduced into. Sacramento perch populations exist in six California watersheds, including Clear Lake Reservoir, Cedar Creek, Walker River, upper Owens River, Mono Lake, and Abbotts Lagoon. In Colorado, there were two successful introductions in private land, one in Abrams Lake and the other in Gilberts Pond. The growth rate of the fish here was very rapid, but spawning is yet to be determined. Sacramento perch populations in Nevada were transplanted in 1877 from the Sacramento River into Washoe Lake. Eventually, they were moved again into Pyramid and Walker Lake in 1880. These populations have grown and expanded in Eureka, Churchhill, Elko, Humbolt, Lander, and Washoe counties. However, the populations in Pyramid and Washoe Lake need a current reevaluation since the state of Nevada has been implementing actions of introducing large predatory game fish such as walleyes, basses, and other centrarchid species. In Utah, the early populations of Nevada were transplanted in the Garrison Reservoir along the Bear River. According to the state wildlife agency, in 2006, the population was still present but with a small population. Due to a lack of recent population surveys, this is also currently unknown.

== Diet ==
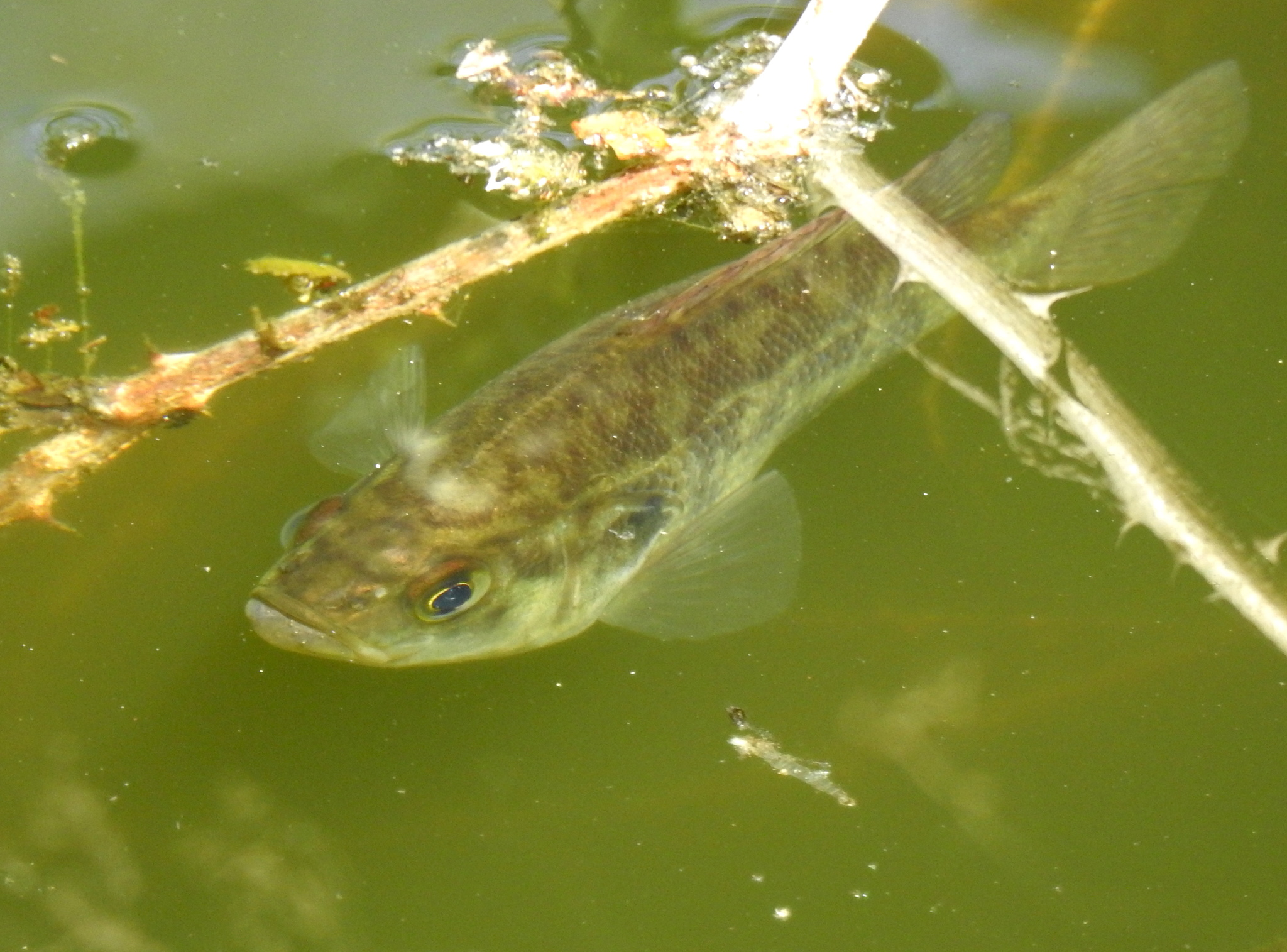
Sacramento perch hunting at the water's surface

Aquatic insects are critical to the Sacramento perch's diet. This fish mostly feeds on chironomid midge larvae and pupae found on the bottom or in aquatic plants during winter months. Triochopteran larvae and recently hatched boatmen are also common insect food sources. During the summer months, this fish will mostly feed on plankton and other surface organisms. The Sacramento perch is an opportunistic species and will generally prey upon whatever is in abundance. They have even been shown to eat mosquito larvae. However, eating mosquito larvae is rare because these fishes are mainly midwater swimmers and do not usually feed on terrestrial or flying insects. The younger and smaller adult perches mostly feed on small benthic crustaceans. As they grow, they move on to chironomid larvae and other fish, including their own species on rare occasions. Sacramento perch of Pyramid Lake have been found feeding on Tui chubs and Tahoe suckers. Based on experimental designs in aquariums, they usually hunt alone and will slowly stalk their prey for a period of time. Once their prey becomes comfortable and loses focus, it is unprecedentedly snatched by the perch's sudden burst toward the prey. This behavior differs from the bluegill, its main competitive species, which usually hunts in schools and is much more aggressive towards its prey. The Sacramento perch is most active at dawn and dusk but can feed at any time of the day or night.

== Breeding pattern ==
Spawning occurs from late March through early August, with peak times being late May and early June when water temperatures are between 18 and 29 °C. Studies in aquarium environments, however, have shown that the range is usually between 22 and 24 °C. The Sacramento perch reaches breeding age at two to three years old. The perch lay their eggs in 8–12 inch diameter nests in shallow waters, usually with rock piles, submerged roots, or other substrates nearby. These nests are not created but found, differentiating them from all the other centrarchid species that create their own nests. Nesting sites are scouted by males about 12 hours before nesting, and once obtained, they begin defending their territory. These nest areas are vigorously defended from other males by chasing, biting, and flaring opercular flaps at each other. Intruders can be attacked within 18 inches of the defender. When getting ready to attack intruders, the Sacramento perch quivers its tail as it maintains itself stationary with its pectoral fins. The entire body of the fish does not move during the quivering. When a female approaches, the aggressive behavior of the male acts as a barrier to immediate mating. Females persistently approach males and are driven off for up to an hour before successful mating. With the consistent approaches, the male recognizes that the intruder is a potential mate. After that, both sexes begin to engage in a set of activities furthering their bond. The male will lightly bite and may try to roll the female to turn on one side. They will also begin to actively pick up small substrates with their mouths and let go of them. Females spawn by releasing their eggs into the nest, followed by the male quickly fertilizing them. Spawning can also occur ventrally side by side, with sperm and egg being released at the same time in a circular fashion. The male cares for the fertilized eggs for several days until they hatch and two days after to defend them against predators. When the eggs hatch, they are like tiny planktonic fish that rise to the surface to feed and grow for a couple of weeks before settling down into the vegetation at the bottom.

== Restoration efforts ==
The Sacramento perch is a very resilient fish species with a highly variable diet. It is adapted to withstand low water clarity, high temperatures, and even water with high salinity and alkalinity. This is why it has been chosen as the primary fish used in aquaponics systems. Aquaponics farms in California are incorporating the use of this endangered species in their systems for growing vegetables. This also serves as a restoration project to breed Sacramento perch to release them back into native waters and add diversity to the wild population. With the rising temperatures in California, the mosquito population has been growing. A study shows that Sacramento perch bred in captivity prefer eating mosquito larvae. These results show that this species has the potential to be used to help control these growing populations in California wetlands. Although populations of Sacramento perch are not as numerous as before, many programs today are focusing on reintroducing them across California waterways again. Potential habitats include Putah Creek and Clear Lake, where the Sacramento perch were abundant at one time but, due to the construction of heavy infrastructure, could not persist. This species is also being reintroduced upstream of its native habitats in gravel pit ponds. However, due to limited genetic diversity, inbreeding has occurred in these isolated populations. To prevent this, reintroduction programs have been pulling only the most diverse fish from current populations and closely monitoring the diversity of the new populations using genetic markers.

== Conservation status ==
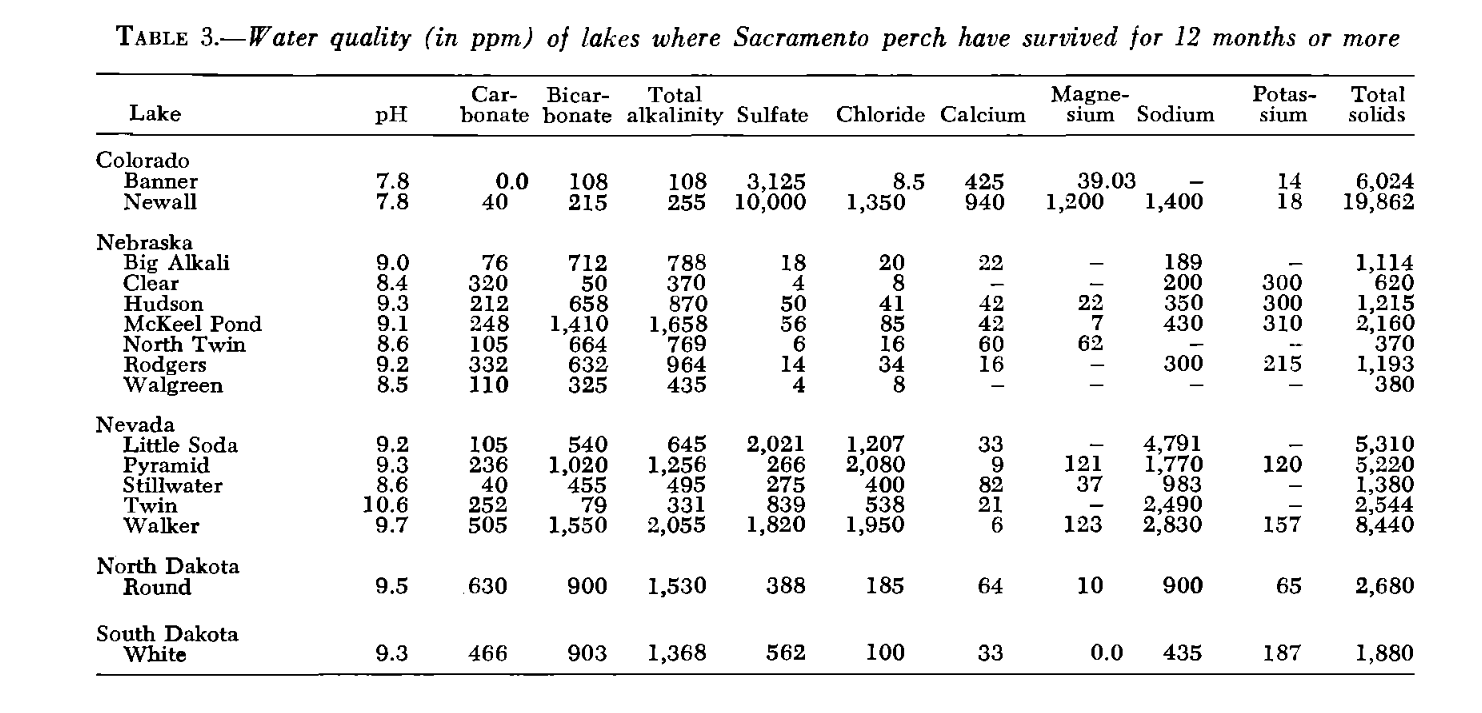
The range tolerance for different chemicals of the Sacramento perch.

The Sacramento perch is considered endangered according to the IUCN red list and its populations are projected to continually decline. The main threat to its population numbers is not so much climate change or even the change in water quality. They are euryhaline organisms, meaning they are well-adapted to survive and reproduce in alkaline waters containing high concentrations of chloride-sulfate and sodium-potassium ions. In these conditions, most other game fish would not survive. The highest alkaline concentration recorded that this fish was found surviving in was 4,083 ppm. The Sacramento perch dies off once the alkalinity concentration goes below 2000 ppm. The main threat to this species' survival is interspecific competition with other introduced centrarchid species that are typically larger in size and prey upon it. One in particular is the bluegill since its diet is similar, and they have the same preferred nesting areas. The bluegill's advantage is not so much in size but in its aggressive behavior. Field observations in small ponds and experimental observations in aquariums consistently show the dominance of the bluegill over the Sacramento perch by aggressively chasing them. This aggression of the bluegill can quickly eliminate young Sacramento perch from shallow nesting waters occupied with aquatic plants. This forces them to lay their eggs in deeper, more open space waters. This poses a threat to individuals as they will be more visible to larger fish predators and birds. The eggs themselves will also be in danger of being eaten by other aquatic organisms. A good example of this detrimental interspecific competition is in Clear Lake, which was known to be one of the habitats containing a prominent Sacramento perch population until it gradually declined as bluegills increased. The best strategy to allow Sacramento perch populations to thrive over invasive species would require the creation of aquatic habitats such as watersheds, reservoirs, or lakes with a high alkalinity salt content. Furthermore, restoring their populations back to their native range of the Central Valley in California would require restoring the flow regime of the rivers as close to their natural state as possible. This means the flows must be in higher magnitude with frequent fluctuations of cold water. Invasive fish would not be adapted to these water fluctuations because of the change in salt content that would arise. It would be particularly effective if these water management practices were targeted in the lower part of the Sacramento River.
