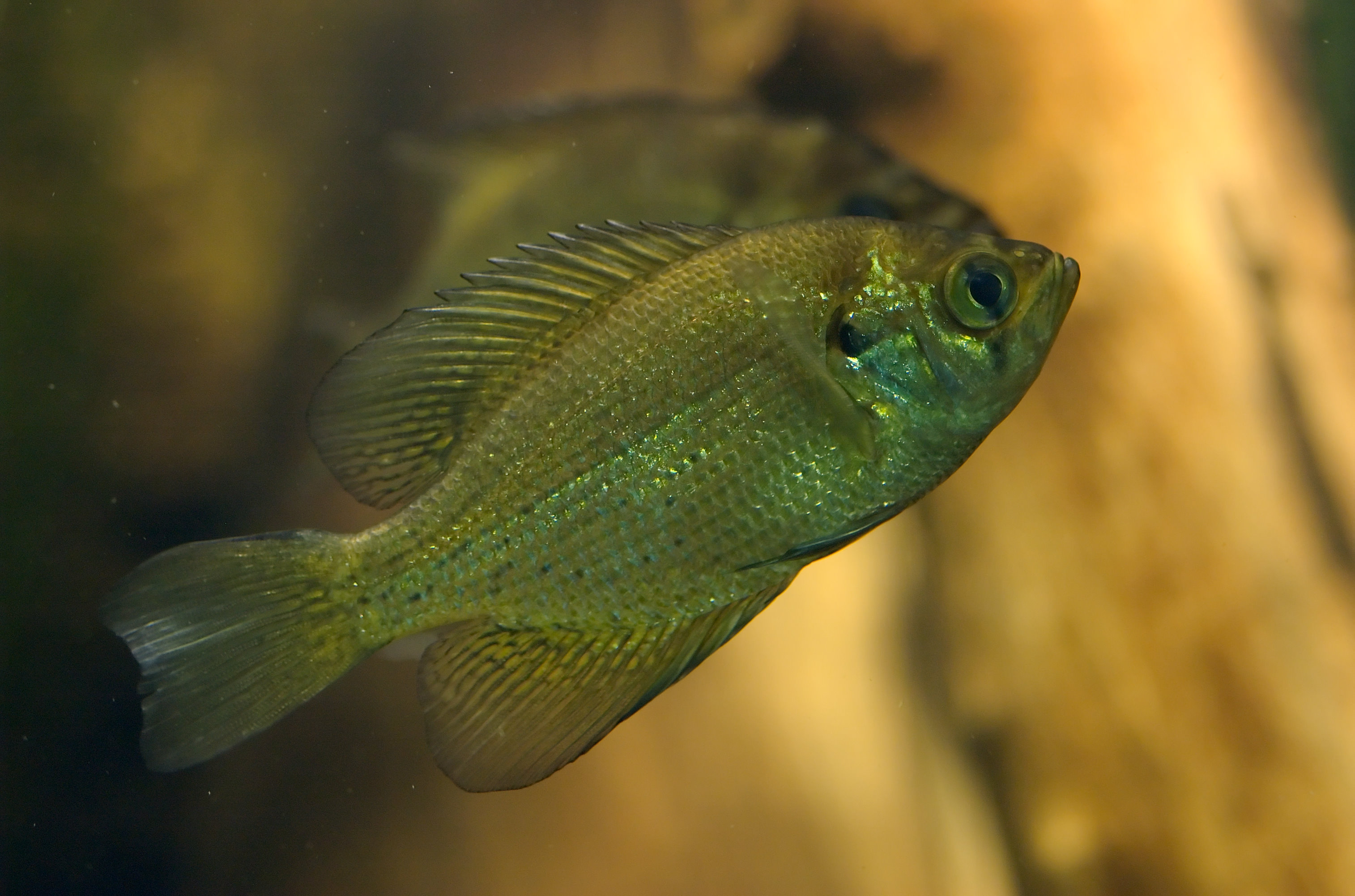
- Centrarchus macropterus

Scientific classification
- Kingdom: Animalia
- Phylum: Chordata
- Class: Actinopterygii
- Order: Centrarchiformes
- Family: Centrarchidae
- Subfamily: Centrarchinae; Bleeker, 1859

= Centrarchinae =

Centrarchinae Temporal range: Early Oligocene–present

Subfamily of ray-finned fishes

Centrarchinae is a subfamily of freshwater ray-finned fish, one of three subfamilies in the family Centrarchidae, the sunfishes.

== Genera ==
The following genera are classified as being in the subfamily Centrarchinae:

- Acantharchus Gill, 1864
- Ambloplites Rafinesque, 1820
- Archoplites Gill, 1861
- Centrarchus Cuvier, 1829
- Enneacanthus Gill, 1864
- Pomoxis Rafinesque, 1818

In addition, the following fossil genera are also placed in this subfamily based on their diagnostic fin rays:

- †Boreocentrarchus Schlaikjer, 1937 (Late Oligocene/Early Miocene of Alaska)
- †Plioplarchus Cope, 1883 (Early Oligocene to Middle Miocene of the Dakotas and Oregon)
