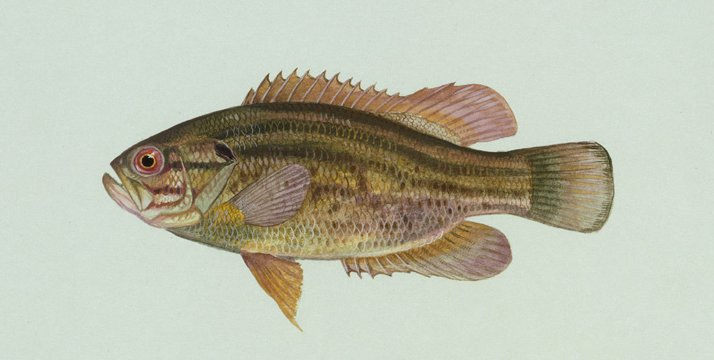

Conservation status
- Least Concern (IUCN 3.1)

Scientific classification
- Kingdom: Animalia
- Phylum: Chordata
- Class: Actinopterygii
- Order: Centrarchiformes
- Family: Centrarchidae
- Subfamily: Centrarchinae
- Genus: Acantharchus; T. N. Gill, 1864
- Species: A. pomotis

Binomial name
- Acantharchus pomotis (S. F. Baird, 1855)

Synonyms
- Centrarchus pomotis Baird, 1855

= Mud sunfish =

Species of fish

The mud sunfish (Acantharchus pomotis) is a freshwater ray-finned fish, a sunfish from the family Centrarchidae, which widely distributed in the fresh waters along the Atlantic coast of North America, ranging from New York to Alabama. It is the only species in the genus Acantharchus.

== Taxonomy ==
The mud sunfish was first formally described as Centrarchus pomotis by Spencer Fullerton Baird in 1855 with the type locality given as Cedar Swamp Creek in, Beesley's Point, New Jersey and the Hackensack River in Rockland County, New York. In 1864, Theodore Nicholas Gill placed it in its own monospecific genus Acantharchus, the new genus name being a compound of the Greek words acanthus meaning "thorn" and asrcus meaning "anus".

== Description ==
The mud sunfish is a small fish which can be distinguished from other members of its family by its possession of five or more spines in its anal fin, by having less than 15 gill rakers and in being the only species in its family that has cycloid scales.

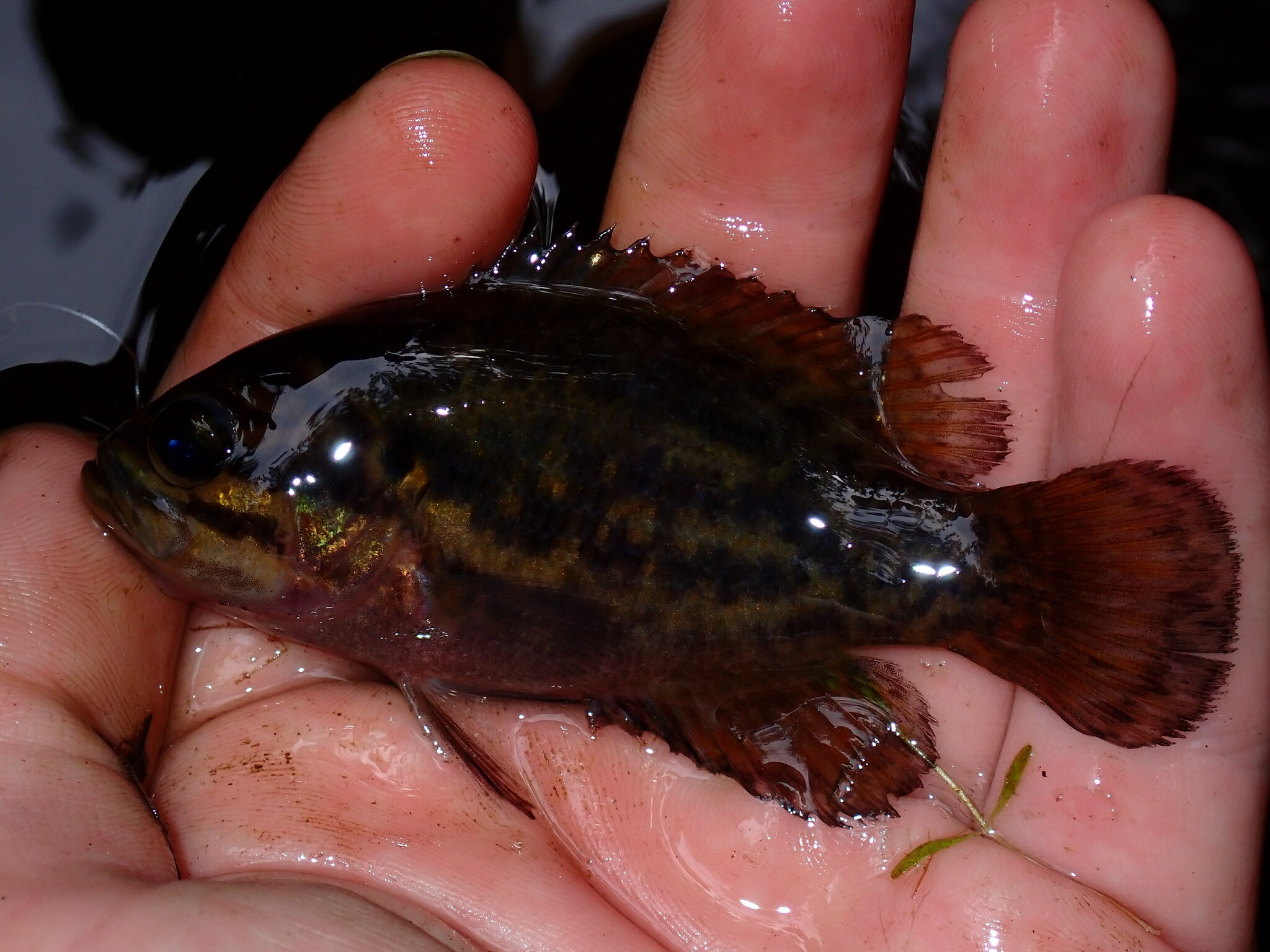
Mud sunfish in New Jersey

Its body is oblong and compressed with a large mouth and eyes. This species has rounded pectoral and caudal fins. which are clear through to dark olive in color and the anal fin has a black margin. It has a dark spot on the gill cover and the color of its body varies from brown on the back to yellowish tan on the flanks, while the juveniles are pale olive. There are three or four parallel dusky, horizontal stripes which extend from the cheek along the body. They can grow to a maximum total length of 21 centimeters (8.3 in), although 14.1 centimeters (5.6 in) is a more common total length.

== Distribution and habitat ==
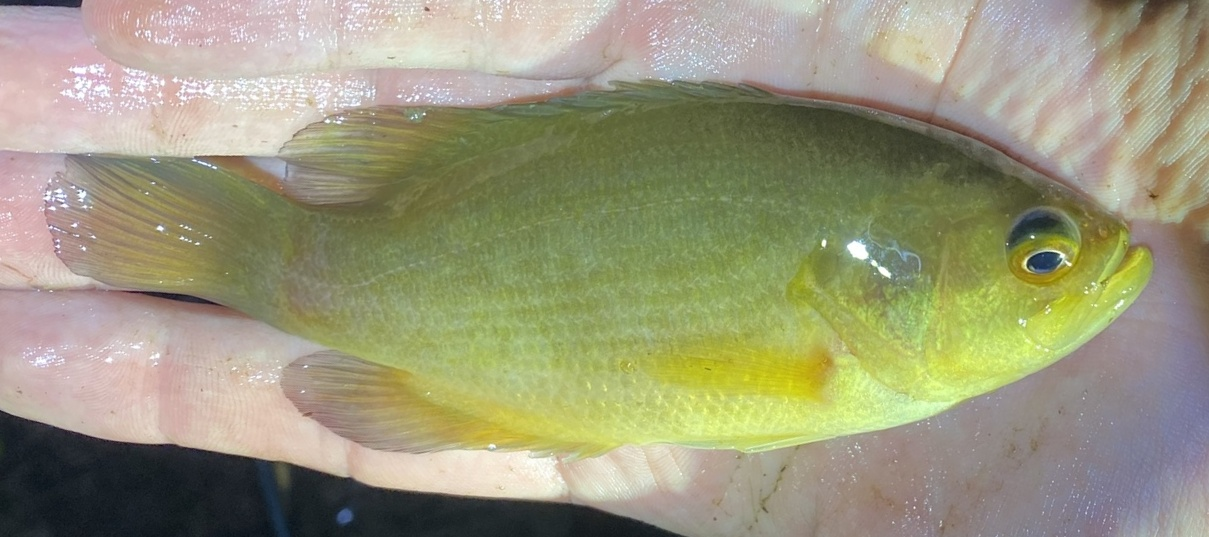
Mud sunfish

The mud sunfish occurs along the eastern seaboard of the United States from southern New York south as far as northern Florida. The range of this species just extends into Alabama where they have been recorded in Beaver Dam Creek in Washington County. There is a gap in their range in Maryland and Virginia, along the western part of Chesapeake Bay between the Susquehanna River and the Potomac River. It is not common anywhere in its range.

The mud sunfish is found in freshwaters which are stained dark with tannins. It has been recorded in slow-moving sluggish, well vegetated creeks, rivers, ponds, lakes and swamps. As its common name suggests it prefers substrates consisting of mud or detritus.

== Breeding ==
This is a nocturnal species which lives at naturally low densities and as a result there have been few studies conducted on it. What has been discovered is that spawning appears to vary with latitude with gravid females being collected during the late spring and early summer in Delaware while further south, in North Carolina and Georgia spawning takes place during the early fall and late winter. They have a maximum life span of eight years and sexual maturity is attained at one year old. Their diet is made up largely of invertebrates including amphipods, decapods, and beetles with some smaller fishes and Odonata.

== Conservation ==
The IUCN has assessed the status of the mud sunfish as Least Concern and states that its population is stable. In individual states, however, there have been significant reductions in the species range. In New York the species was only recorded from the Hackensack River and it has not been collected from there since 1935. Its range has also significantly reduced in New Jersey, particularly in the northern and central parts of the state but it remains reasonable common and widespread in the Pinelands. In New Jersey the fish's decline is possibly a result of a number of reasons including land use and habitat changes and the introduction of non-native fish which predate on the mud sunfish and in this state it has been recommended that it be classified as a species of special concern. It has been extirpated from Pennsylvania.
