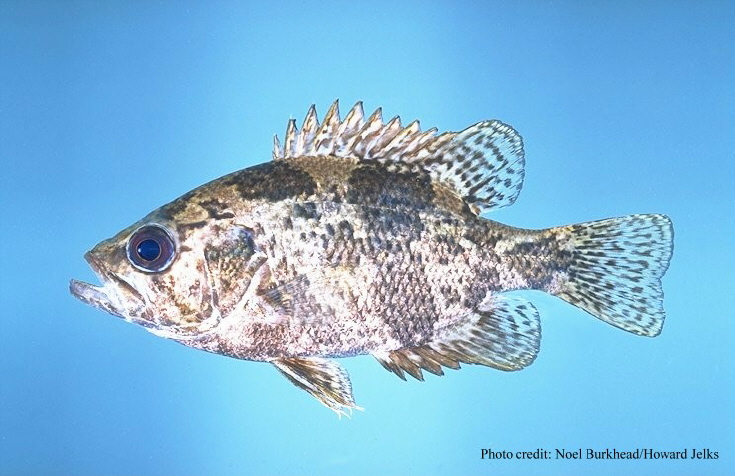

Conservation status
- Least Concern (IUCN 3.1)

Scientific classification
- Kingdom: Animalia
- Phylum: Chordata
- Class: Actinopterygii
- Order: Centrarchiformes
- Family: Centrarchidae
- Genus: Ambloplites
- Species: A. ariommus

Binomial name
- Ambloplites ariommus Viosca, 1936

= Shadow bass =

Species of fish

The shadow bass (Ambloplites ariommus) is a species of freshwater fish in the sunfish family (Centrarchidae) of order Centrarchiformes. It is endemic to southeastern United States.

== Description ==
The shadow bass has a lateral line containing 36 to 42 scales. There are 11 spines and 11 to 12 soft rays in the dorsal fin while the anal fin contains six or seven spines and 10 to 11 soft rays. It has a large mouth with the maxilla at the level of the center of its eye. They are olive to light brown in color and there are frequently two to four dark brown vertical bands and blotches along their flanks. The dorsal, anal and caudal fins are usually transparent to light yellow and are mottled with black and gray. The iris is reddish, and the pupil is deep blue. There is a black band which runs from beneath the eye onto the gill cover. The spots on the scales of the shadow bass are triangular while the similar rock bass (Ambloplites rupestris) has rectangular spots on its scales. The shadow bass is a medium-sized sunfish which has an average standard length of around 10.16 centimeters (4.00 in) and a maximum length of 30.48 centimeters (12.00 in) and weight of 0.45 kilograms (0.99 lb). Females normally live longer than the males but the males are faster growing and grow larger.

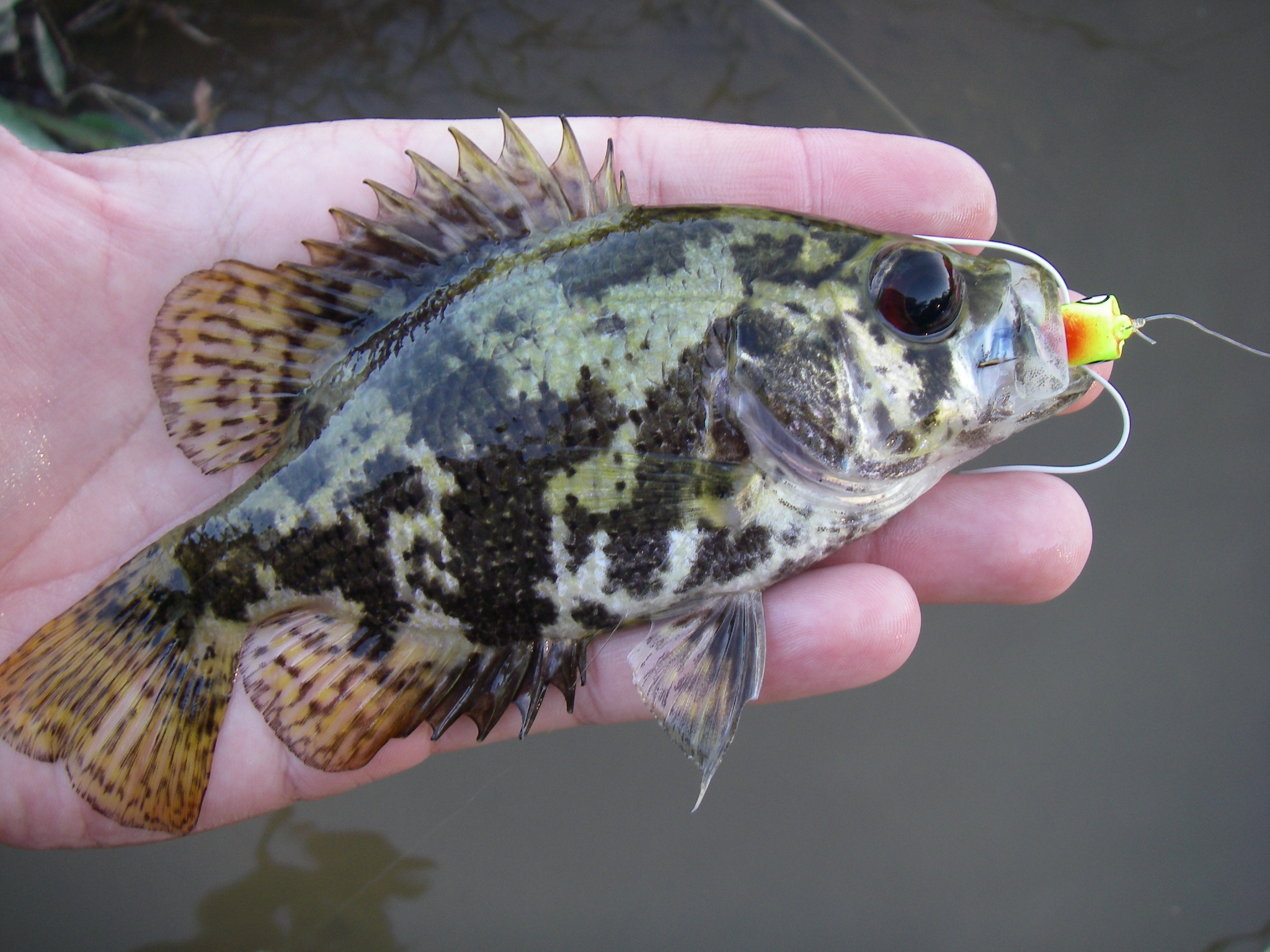
Shadow Bass From Comite River, near Olive Branch, Louisiana

== Geographic distribution ==
The shadow bass's native range includes the southeastern United States from the Apalachicola River drainage in Georgia to the lower Mississippi basin in Louisiana. Two isolated populations reported in the St. Francis, Black Arkansas Red, and upper Ouachita River drainages in Missouri and Arkansas in the Ozark regions may either not represent this species or are hybrids with Ambloplites rupestris. In Tennessee, the shadow bass can be found in most drainages south of the Tennessee River. Other river drainages that shadow bass inhabit are Blackwater and Chattahoochee Rivers in southern Georgia and northern Florida. The apparent absence of shadow bass in Black Belt streams is probably the result of low stream flow and poor water-quality conditions during the late summer when temperatures are high. Channelization is a possible factor in the distribution of the shadow bass in Mississippi River systems, but no difference in the distribution of shadow bass was found.

== Ecology ==
The shadow bass is a freshwater fish that inhabits a climate range of 38 to 29°N in the United States. It prefers slow-flowing water over substrates of silt-free mud, sand, gravel, and pebbles. Brushy and vegetated pools are preferred microhabitat in most streams. Undercut banks and woody debris in small to medium-sized rivers and streams are also preferred habitat. The quantitative diet of shadow bass consists mostly of small invertebrates, mainly crayfish when less than three inches; after three inches, they can begin feeding on small fish species such as darters, madtoms, and minnows. The main predator and competitor of the shadow bass is the smallmouth bass which inhabits the same microhabitat. Research on the introduction of rainbow trout (Oncorhynchus mykiss) in shadow bass habitat to measure competition between the species, the data showed no effect on shadow bass populations. Factors by humans that might attribute to population decline of the shadow bass channelization, sedimentation from logging, and habitat encroachment.

== Life history ==
Shadow bass normally spawn from January to August, spawning season being determined by water temperature and so by location to some extent too. Spawning is earlier in southern Alabama or southern Georgia as the water is warmer in these regions, while fish found at higher latitudes typically spawn later when the water reached the ideal spawning temperature of 17–21 °C (63–70 °F). The breeding males show obvious darkening to the membranes of the pelvic and anal fins while these remain yellow or white in the females. Sexual maturity is attained at a year old and a mature female may lay 1,300 eggs in a spawning season, although after cold winters fewer, larger eggs are laid and this means that spawn hatching rates are not affected by temperature. This strategy of laying a smaller number of larger eggs after colder winters or a larger number of smaller eggs after milder winters ensures that the population of shadow bass has a consistent recruitment rate.

== Taxonomy and etymology ==
The shadow bass is a member of the centrarchids or sunfish family and is closely related to the rock bass Ambloplites rupestris along with one more related species occurring naturally. The shadow bass was previously considered to be a subspecies of the rock bass (A. rupestris). It was first formally described in 1936 by Peter Viosca Jr. with the type locality given as Little Bogue Falaya Creek, three miles north of Covington, Louisiana. The generic name is derived from Greek and is a compound of ambloo meaning "blunt" and oplites meaning "shield", while the specific name means "large-eyed".

== Relationship with humans ==
=== Management ===
Through its range even for the two isolated populations, the shadow bass is not listed as being in any danger, and the shadow bass is federally listed as G5 secure, while the IUCN classify its status as Least Concern. Current management for the shadow bass in the rivers in Mississippi was to protects pools and prevent sediment pollution in areas of shadow bass populations. In most places, shadow bass are not considered a game fish and receive little management attention. In Missouri, however, where shadow bass has a demand in the game fish market, biologists are conducting population studies using mark and recapture methods and information for anglers to provide data to determine what, if any, angling restrictions need to apply to shadow bass fishing.

=== Angling ===
The IGFA all tackle world record for the shadow bass stands at 0.82 kg (1 lb 13 oz) caught from the Spring River in Arkansas.

== Bibliography ==
- FishBase: Ambloplites ariommus
- "Ambloplites ariommus". Integrated Taxonomic Information System.
