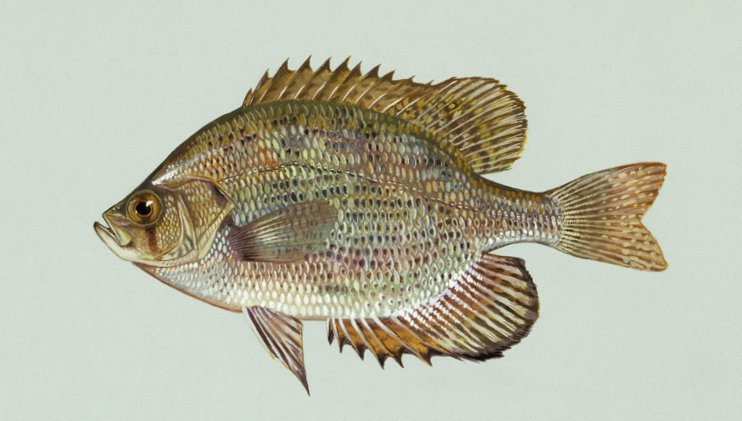

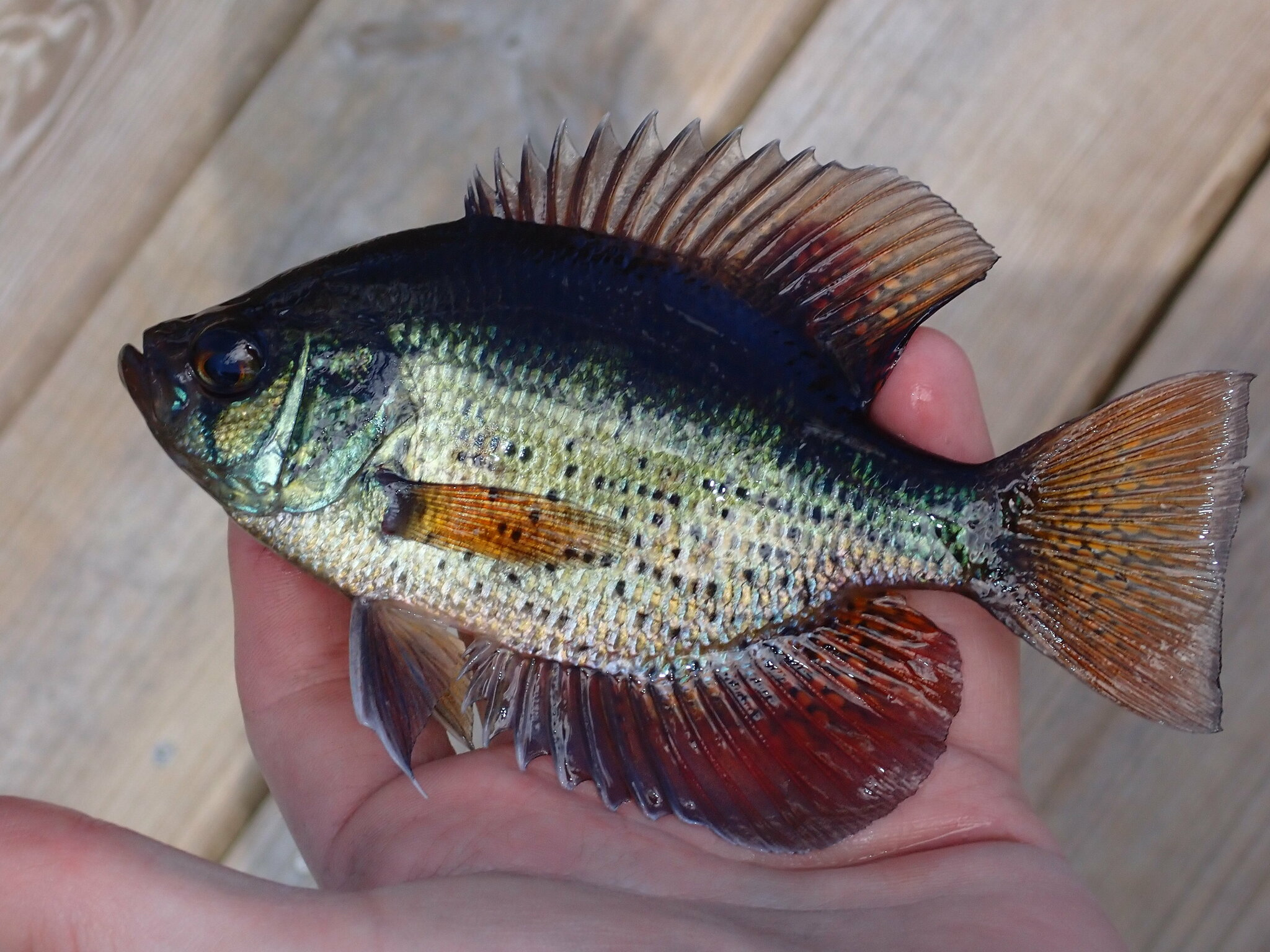
- In Virginia

Conservation status
- Least Concern (IUCN 3.1)

Scientific classification
- Kingdom: Animalia
- Phylum: Chordata
- Class: Actinopterygii
- Division: Teleostei
- Order: Centrarchiformes
- Family: Centrarchidae
- Subfamily: Centrarchinae
- Genus: Centrarchus; Cuvier, 1829
- Species: C. macropterus

Binomial name
- Centrarchus macropterus (Lacépède, 1801)

Synonyms
- Labrus macropterus Lacépède, 1801

= Flier (fish) =

Species of fish

The flier (Centrarchus macropterus) is a species of freshwater ray-finned fish, a sunfish from the family Centrarchidae which is endemic to the southern United States. It is the only species in the monospecific genus Centrarchus.

== Taxonomy ==
The flier was first formally described by the French naturalist Bernard Germain de Lacépède (1756–1825) in 1801 as Labrus macropterus with the type locality given as South Carolina. In 1829 Georges Cuvier placed it in the genus Centrarchus. Centrarchus is the sister genus to Archoplites and in turn these two are sister to Pomoxis.

=== Etymology ===
The generic name is a compound of the Greek kentron meaning "sting" and archos meaning "anus", a reference to the long spines in the anal fin. The specific name macropterus is also Greek and means "long fin".

== Distribution ==
The flier is found in the southern part of the United States along the Atlantic seaboard from the Potomac River drainage in Maryland, where it was most likely introduced, to central Florida. It is then found along the Gulf of Mexico drainages as far west as the Trinity River in Texas, and then north in Mississippi River system to above the fall line in southern Illinois and southern Indiana.

== Description ==
The flier is a small, strongly compressed species of sunfish which has a moderately sized, oblique mouth. The dorsal fin has 11–13 spines and 12–14 soft rays while the anal fin has 7–8 spines and 13–15 soft rays. It has a lateral line and the scales are ctenoid. The flanks have a scattering of dark spots, the underside is pale, and the upperparts are olive in color. There is a vertical dark line through the eye which continues below the eye in what has been described as a "teardrop". Fish of a standard length less than around 45 millimeters (1.8 in) have an obvious dark eyespot, or ocellus, which has a reddish margin on the soft part of the dorsal fin. The pectoral and pelvic fins are dusky with paler reticulations. The maximum total length recorded is 29.2 centimeters (11.5 in) but they are more commonly around 13 centimeters (5.1 in) and the maximum published weight is 1.35 pounds.

== Habitat and biology ==
The flier is found in clear, acidic waters including ponds in swamps, sloughs, oxbows, slow-flowing creeks and steams. These habitats should be heavily vegetated and have an average water temperature of 23 to 29 °C (73 to 84 °F). They feed largely on invertebrates including insects, snails, worms and leeches although they will also eat smaller fishes and some phytoplankton.

=== Reproduction ===
Breeding normally occurs March to May when the water temperature reaches 14–17 °C (57–63 °F) but it has been recorded as early as February. The gravid females have been collected from a variety of habitat including debris filled ditches with soft bottoms as well as gravel bottomed streams and heavily vegetated sand and gravel pits. They will spawn in a variety of water conditions ranging from free-flowing clear or turbid water through stagnant water in ditches and pools. Fliers create nests in rocks or gravel and surround their eggs with a round adhesive egg envelope. They are colonial nesters, nesting in aggregations with the nests quite closely spaced. Sexual maturity is attained at one year old and when they are 70 millimeters (2.8 in) long. The male parent guards the eggs and newly hatched fry.

== Cultural references ==
A Gato-class submarine, USS Flier, built in 1943, was named for this species.

== See also ==
- Centrarchiformes
