= Elk Hair Caddis =

Fishing fly used for trout fishing

- Artificial fly
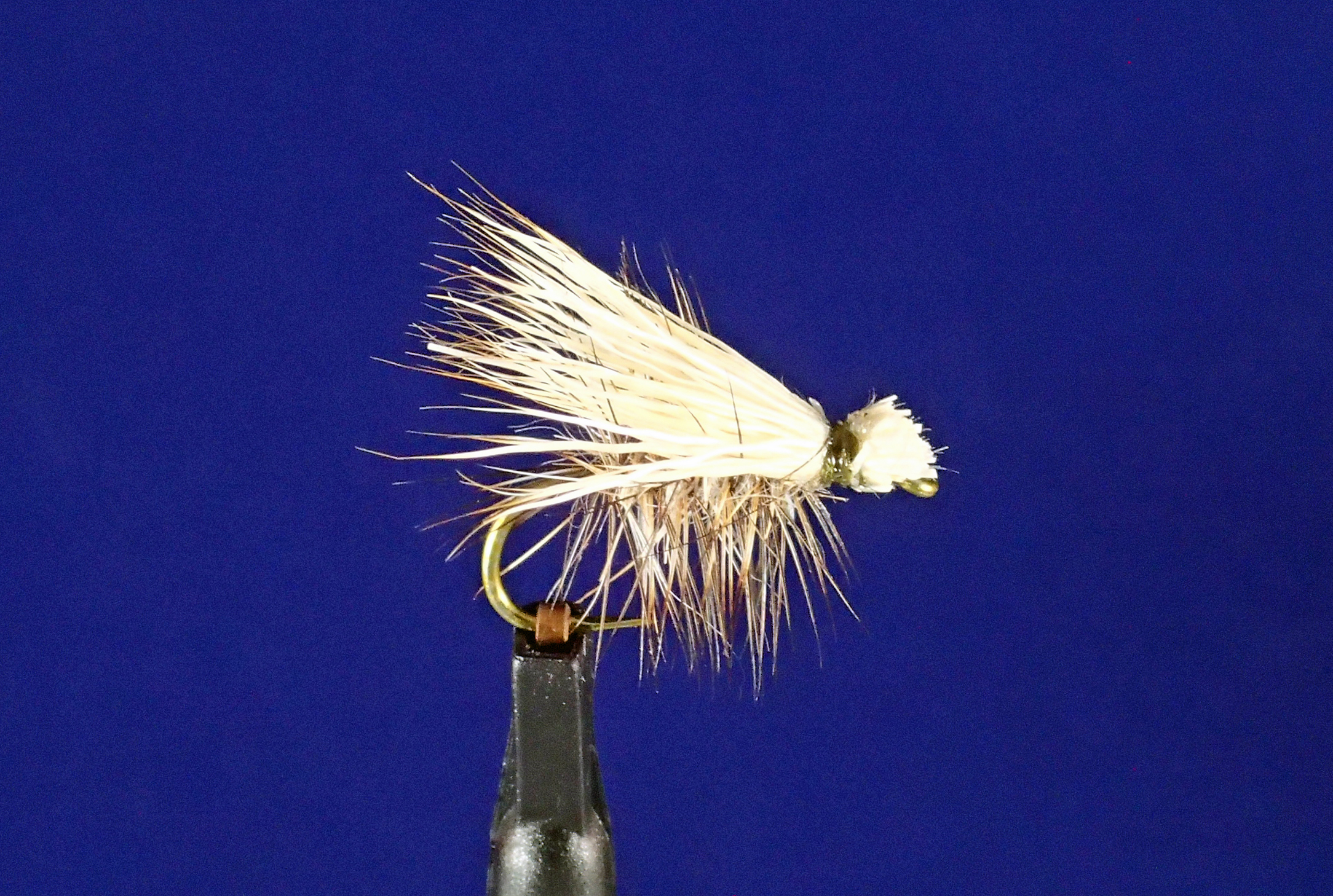
- Type: Dry fly
- Imitates: Adult Caddisfly, Stonefly

History
- Creator: Al Troth
- Created: 1957
- Other names: Deer hair caddis
- Variations: Olive or grizzly bodies and hackle; without hackle

Materials
- Typical sizes: 10-20
- Typical hooks: TMC 100, Daiichi 1100, Mustad 94833, Dai Riki 300
- Thread: Tan 6/0 or 8/0
- Tail: None
- Body: Tan fur
- Wing: Light Elk or Deer hair
- Ribbing: Fine gold wire
- Hackle: Ginger, palmered
- Thorax: None
- Legs: None
- Head: Tan thread
- Bead: None

Uses
- Primary use: Trout, Grayling
- Other uses: Panfish, steelhead

Reference(s)
- Pattern references: Trout Flies-The Tier's Reference (1999) Hughes

The Elk Hair Caddis is a dry fly commonly used for trout fishing. The Elk Hair Caddis was created by Pennsylvania fly tyer Al Troth in 1957. He is considered a pioneer in the sport of fly fishing for this invention.

== Imitates ==
The Elk Hair Caddis is considered a searching type pattern as it resembles the general form of adult caddisflies or small stoneflies. Troth created the pattern and first fished it in 1957 on Loyalsock Creek in eastern Pennsylvania. The fly was inspired by several palmered flies Troth liked to fish and G. E. M. Skues' Little Red Sedge fly which featured a hair wing. Originally tied to imitate the Green Caddis hatch, the Elk Hair Caddis has since been tied in a variety of wing, hackle and body colors to simulate different caddis and small stoneflies.

== Materials ==
John Gierach explains the materials he uses to create the original Elk Hair Caddis. For a hook he uses the Mustad 94840 ranging from sizes 12–18. Then he uses a dubbed body, palmer hackle, elk hair wings, and a small head to close out the fly.

== Elk Hair Caddis for steelhead ==
The Elk Hair Caddis is not limited to trout fishing. This fly is also very useful when fishing for steelhead. Steelhead are the anadromous form (sea-run) of rainbow trout which means some alterations to the standard Elk Hair Caddis are necessary. The hook size should vary from size 6–10. The legs should be a medium grade hackle (non webby, but not dry-fly either).The body could be either vernille, furry foam, coarse bodied dubbing, sparkle braid, or four strand floss. The wings should be made from natural elk hair with the ends clipped short. An optional aspect of the Elk Hair Caddis for steelhead would be a flash. A flash is just a few strands of subtle translucent material placed underneath the wing.
