= Al Troth =

Fisherman

- Born: May 30, 1930; Monessen, Pennsylvania, US
- Died: August 3, 2012 (aged 82); Dillon, Montana, US
- Education: California State Teachers College
- Occupations: Fly Fishing guide and fly tier
- Known for: Inventor of Elk Hair Caddis
- Spouse: Martha Manandise
- Children: 1

Al Troth (May 30, 1930 – August 3, 2012) is an American fisherman, considered a pioneer in the sport of fly fishing. He is known for his variations of popular trout fishing flies as well as the inventor of the Elk Hair Caddis fly.

== Early life and education ==
Troth was born in Monessen, Pennsylvania, to an Anna and Alfred Troth. He began fishing at age twelve in Pennsylvania, and continued to fish local rivers and streams in Pennsylvania as a hobby. He graduated in 1948 from Monessen High School.

== Career ==
Troth worked at a steel company in Pittsburgh before joining the Navy; after four years of service he returned to the steel company. During this time Troth attended California State Teachers College where he met Martha Manandise, his future wife. Troth taught Machine Shop at a local high school for about fifteen years.

Troth spent much of his spare time fishing, including many fishing trips to Montana. He developed skill and expertise at fly tying. In 1957 Troth invented a new type of fly, the Elk Hair Caddis fly. This fly, and variations of it, has been a fly fishing standard for over fifty years. It was tied using the hair of a female elk, bleached so as to be more visible. He also designed other flies, although none were as popular as the Elk Hair Caddis. Troth was recognized in a number of books and magazines for his beautiful and intricate fly patterns. His fly tying skill led him to be on the cover of Fly Fisherman magazine three times.

Troth became familiar with Beaverhead, Big Hole and other Montana streams and rivers, and moved to the small town of Dillon, Montana in 1973 with his wife and son, Eric. There he went into business as a fly tier and guide, conducting and coordinating fishing trips for fly fisherman as well as fishing himself.

Troth died August 3, 2012, after suffering from Parkinsons disease and dementia for some time.
