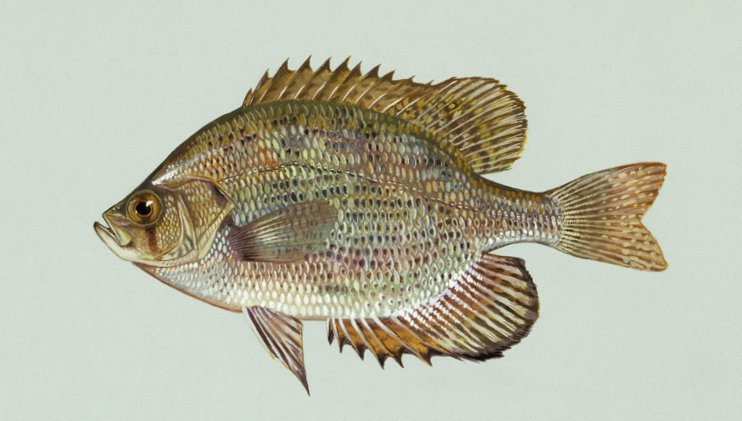
- Flier (Centrarchus macropterus)

Scientific classification
- Kingdom: Animalia
- Phylum: Chordata
- Class: Actinopterygii
- Order: Centrarchiformes
- Suborder: Centrarchoidei
- Family: Centrarchidae; Bleeker, 1859

Type species
- Centrarchus macropterus Lacépède, 1801

Subfamilies
- Centrarchinae; Lepominae
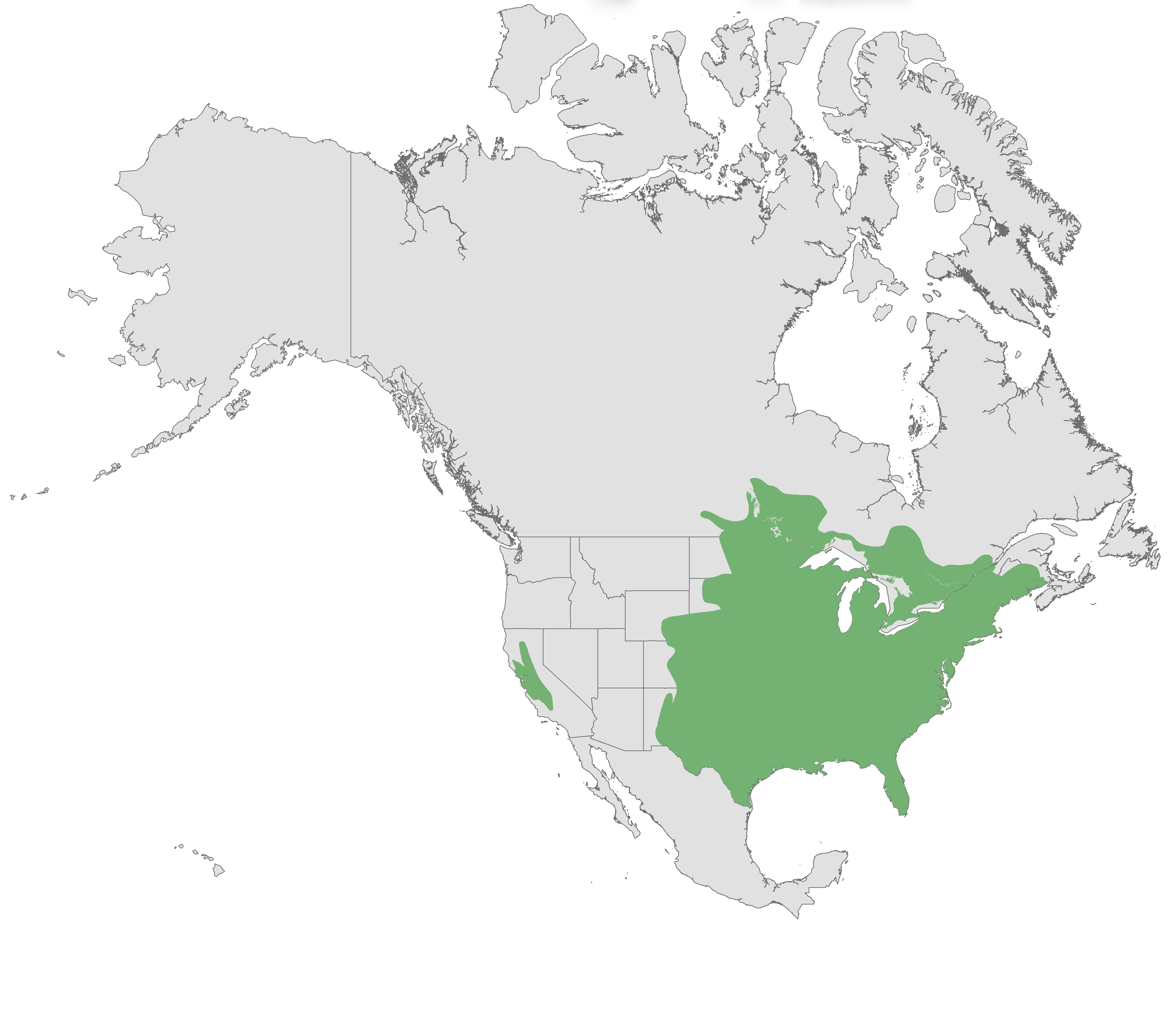
- native range of sunfish family, populations of northeastern Mexico are not shown

= Centrarchidae =

Sunfish Temporal range: Late Eocene to Recent

Family of ray-finned fishes

Centrarchidae, better known as sunfishes or centrarchids, is a family of freshwater ray-finned fish belonging to the order Centrarchiformes, native only to North America. There are eight universally included genera within the centrarchid family: Lepomis (true sunfishes), Micropterus (black basses), Pomoxis (crappies), Enneacanthus (banded sunfishes), Centrarchus (type genus, consisting solely of the flier C. macropterus), Archoplites (Sacramento perch), Ambloplites (rock basses), and Acantharchus (mud sunfish). Their closest relatives are the pygmy sunfishes of the family Elassomatidae, which are sometimes placed in the same family, although presently treated as distinct.

The centrarchid family comprises 38 identified species, 34 of which are extant. It includes many popular game fishes familiar to North American anglers, such as the rock bass, largemouth bass, bluegill, pumpkinseed, green sunfish and crappies. Most sunfish are highly valued panfish for sport fishing, and have been introduced in many areas outside their native ranges, sometimes becoming invasive species. While edible, they are not commercially marketed as food fish.

== Evolution ==
As their name suggests, sunfishes are most closely related to the pygmy sunfishes (Elassomatidae), which also occur in North America. Together, these two families are sister to the Chinese perches (Sinipercidae) of East Asia. These three families are among the few temperate Northern Hemisphere members of the order Centrarchiformes (primarily found in the Southern Hemisphere and the tropics), and share the suborder Centrarchoidei with a group of temperate Southern Hemisphere fishes that include the jutjaw, oldwife, and the Australian temperate perches.

The earliest fossils of Centrarchidae are from latest Eocene to early Oligocene deposits from Montana and South Dakota, belonging to several as yet undescribed species. Two extinct genera are also known: †Plioplarchus from the Early Oligocene to the Middle Miocene of the Dakotas & Oregon, and †Boreocentrarchus from the Late Oligocene or Early Miocene of southern Alaska (making it one of the northernmost known members of the family). Both Plioplarchus and Boreocentrarchus are classified in the subfamily Centrarchinae, because these species possess more than three anal fin spines.

=== Taxonomy ===
The family is classified as follows:

- Family Centrarchidae
  - Subfamily Centrarchinae
    - Acantharchus Gill, 1864
    - Ambloplites Rafinesque, 1820
    - Archoplites Gill, 1861
    - Centrarchus Cuvier, 1829
    - Enneacanthus Gill, 1864
    - Pomoxis Rafinesque, 1818
    - †Boreocentrarchus Schlaikjer, 1937 (fossil; late Oligocene/early Miocene of Alaska)
    - †Plioplarchus Cope, 1883 (fossil; Oligocene to Miocene of western North America)
  - Subfamily Lepominae
    - Lepomis Rafinesque, 1816
    - Micropterus Lacépède, 1802

=== Phylogeny ===
Recent genetic evidence suggests the following taxonomy of the centrarchid genera and species:

- Centrarchidae
  - Acantharchus pomotis
  - - Centrarchinae
      - - Centrarchus
          Centrarchus macropterus
      - - Enneacanthus
          - - Enneacanthus chaetodon
            - - Enneacanthus gloriosus
              - Enneacanthus obesus
        - Tribe Archoplitini
          - Pomoxis (crappies)
            - Pomoxis annularis
            - Pomoxis nigromaculatus
          - - Archoplites
              - Archoplites interruptus
            - Ambloplites (rock basses)
              - - Ambloplites ariommus
                - Ambloplites rupestris
              - - Ambloplites cavifrons
                - Ambloplites constellatus
    - Lepominae
      - Micropterus (black basses)
        - - Micropterus dolomieu
          - Micropterus punctulatus
        - - Micropterus cataractae
          - - Micropterus coosae
            - - Micropterus notius
              - - Micropterus treculi
                - - Micropterus nigricans
                  - Micropterus floridanus
      - Lepomis (true sunfish)
        - - - Lepomis humilis
            - Lepomis macrochirus
          - - - Lepomis gulosus
            - - Lepomis symmetricus
              - Lepomis cyanellus
        - - - - Lepomis auritus
              - - Lepomis marginatus
                - - Lepomis peltastes
                  - Lepomis megalotis
            - - Lepomis gibbosus
              - - Lepomis microlophus
                - - Lepomis punctatus
                  - Lepomis miniatus

The 5th edition of Fishes of the World recognises three subfamilies; the Lepominae, which contains the genera Acantharchus, Lepomis, and Micropterus; the Elassomatinae, which consists solely of the highly distinct genus Elassoma (treated by Fishbase as a separate family, the Elassomatidae); and the Centrarchinae, which contains all of the remaining genera. The more recent Eschmeyer's Catalog of Fishes again treats Elassomatidae as a distinct family, with Centrarchidae composed of Lepominae and Centrarchinae.

== Description ==
Family members are distinguished by having a laterally compressed body shape, 6 to 9 anal spines, and 2 dorsal fins (spinous first dorsal and rayed second dorsal) which are fused. The number of dorsal spines varies from 6 to 13. All species in Micropterus and Lepomis have 3 anal spines, which distinguishes them from the other genera in the family. The pseudobranch is small and concealed. Body size varies widely within the family with the black-banded sunfish at just 8 cm (3.1 in) in length, while the largemouth bass is reported to reach almost 1 m (3.3 ft) in extreme cases.

Many of the species within Centrarchidae can be separated into two main groups based on the two most common genera (Micropterus and Lepomis). Species in the genera Lepomis are defined by a deep or more round body shape, smaller mouths, and obtaining food through suction feeding. Species in the genera Micropterus are defined by a more streamlined body shape, larger mouths, and consuming prey primarily by ram feeding methods.

== Habitat ==
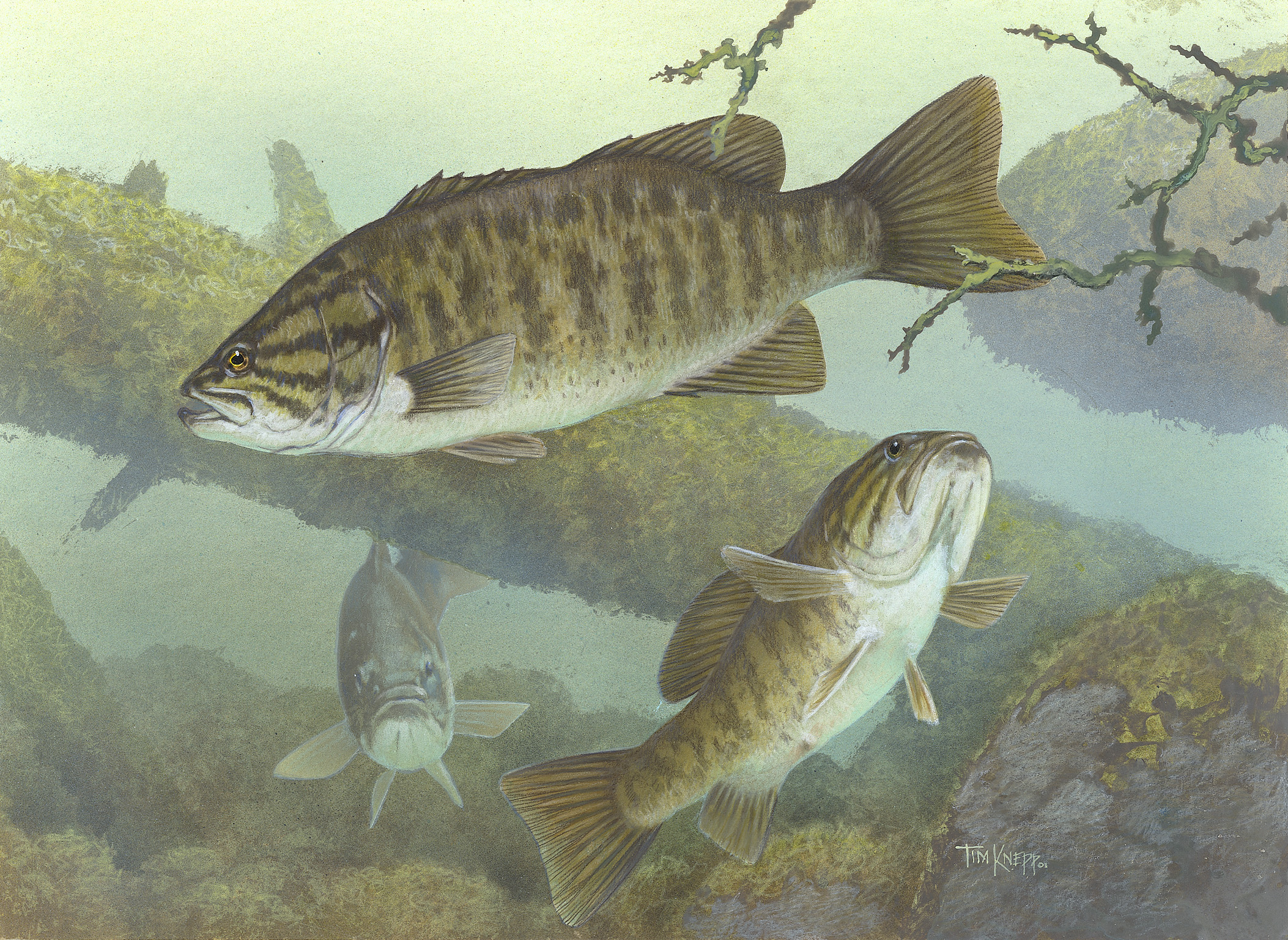
Smallmouth bass (Micropterus dolomieu)

Centrarchids prefer clear, warm, and slower-moving water, and are commonly found in habitats such as lakes, ponds, medium to low flow streams and rivers, and swamps. They also prefer to live in and around aquatic vegetation so they can get adequate coverage from predators. While few species in the family diverge from the aforementioned habitat list, the Sacramento perch can survive in habitats with unusually high alkalinity, salinity, and temperatures. Centrarchids can be found in various locations within the water column and their exact preference is species specific. For instance, bluegill (Lepomis macrochirus) mainly inhabit the deeper littoral zones, while green sunfish (Lepomis cyanellus) prefer habitats near the shoreline and shallower areas. Suction feeders within the family (i.e. Lepomis) generally feed off the bottom of their habitat, while ram feeders (i.e. Micropterus) generally feed in more open areas known as the limnetic zone. Centrarchids diet consists of macro-invertebrates (e.g. insects, snails and crayfish) and other fish found in their habitat.

=== Thermal tolerance ===
In freshwater systems, water temperature is determined by many abiotic factors, with air temperature being one of the most significant contributors. As in other ectotherms, many physiological processes and behaviors in Centrarchidae, such as feeding and reproduction, are heavily impacted by the temperature in their environment. All species in the family Centrarchidae are considered warmwater adapted species. In general, warmwater adapted species are characterized as being larger at higher temperatures and lower latitudes. The optimal temperature range of most species in the family is 28 °C(82 °F) to 32 °C(90 °F), although they can survive and reproduce in temperatures that are outside of this optimum range. Increases in temperature outside the optimal range for centrarchids can have negative effects, such as speeding up reproductive maturity or increasing mortality after the first reproductive event. The lethal temperature range varies widely in the family, but some species have been seen to survive water temperatures as low as 1 °C(33 °F) or as high as 41 °C(106 °F).

== Reproduction ==
Centrarchids generally spawn in the spring, and juveniles emerge in the late spring to early summer. The transition from winter to spring conditions (i.e. melting of ice-cover, increase in day length, and increased food availability) is the main cue for centrarchids to begin preparing for reproduction. All species within Centrarchidae, except for those in the genus Micropterus, develop breeding coloration in both males and females (although less defined in females) during the breeding season. The process of courtship and reproduction is nearly identical for all species in the family, which is a major reason for the high levels of hybridization within Centrarchidae. With that said, there are some mechanisms in place to prevent hybridization, such as intricate morphology of the operculum in Lepomis, which assists in recognition of conspecific mates.

To initiate reproduction, males dig a deep circular depression in the substrate with their caudal fins to create a nest, which they will aggressively defend from intruding males. Males and females then undergo a courtship dancing ritual before the female deposits her eggs into the male's nest. Multiple females may deposit eggs in a single nest. Larger males usually attract more mates and also take better care of their offspring. Male parental care includes nest building, nest guarding, guarding of eggs and fry, and nest fanning (aerating eggs).

Males unsuccessful at courtship may exhibit a cheater strategy where they sneak fertilizations of female's eggs by various behavioral methods. This is commonly seen with smaller males in the genus Lepomis.

== Range ==
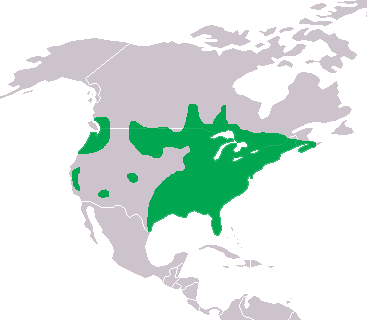
native and introduced range of the sunfish family

The native range of Centrarchidae is confined within North America, covering most of the United States and stopping in southern Canada. The northern edge of the native range is heavily bound by temperature due to reduced foraging ability and growth in cold weather and subsequent starvation in winter months. As a result, centrarchid distributions and range in any place they are found will be restricted by cold temperatures.

=== Range shifts ===
The ability to adapt to cold temperatures at the edge of the sunfish range varies widely within the family. Largemouth bass (Micropterus nigricans) have no cold acclimation ability as seen through the strict maintenance of the northern boundary of the species range. Other species like smallmouth bass (Micropterus dolomieu) and green sunfish (Lepomis cyanellus) have exhibited signs of minor cold-water adaptation and have even experienced slight range expansions into colder habitats.

If air temperatures continue to rise in the next 50 to 100 years as predicted, warmwater species like centrarchids will likely experience range expansions northward and see an overall increase in occupiable habitat. This range expansion can have grave consequences for other freshwater fishes however, as many centrarchids are dominant top predators which can severely alter the community structure of non-native ecosystems and drive the extinction of other native predators.

=== Invasive range ===
While centrarchids are native to only North America, they can be found worldwide due to introductions on multiple continents, including Europe, South America, Africa, and Asia. At least 18 species of Centrarchidae are North American exports. Its multi-continental spread is mostly due to the high popularity of the family (especially from the genera Micropterus) as freshwater game fish that are frequently stocked for recreational fishing all around Europe.

Across the globe, invasive and introduced centrarchids pose a great threat to native species in the areas they invade. There are multiple confirmed instances of largemouth bass (Micropterus nigricans) severely altering and reducing native fish populations in Italy, South Africa, Japan, and Madagascar and even causing the local extinction of any species of the family Cyprinodontidae within the waterbodies they have invaded in Mexico.
