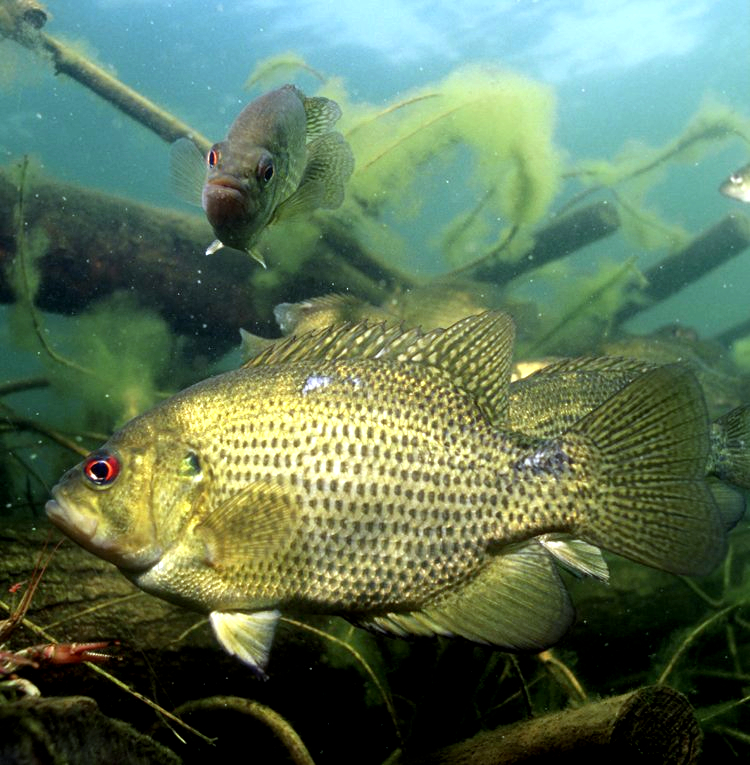
- Rock bass (A. rupestris)

Scientific classification
- Kingdom: Animalia
- Phylum: Chordata
- Class: Actinopterygii
- Division: Teleostei
- Order: Centrarchiformes
- Family: Centrarchidae
- Subfamily: Centrarchinae
- Genus: Ambloplites; Rafinesque, 1820

Type species
- Lepomis ictheloides Rafinesque, 1820

Species
- see text

Synonyms
- Bartramiolus Fowler, 1945

= Ambloplites =

Genus of ray-finned fishes

Ambloplites is a genus of North American freshwater ray-finned fish in the sunfish family (Centrarchidae) of order Centrarchiformes. The type species is A. rupestris, the rock bass, and the species of this genus are known collectively as the rock basses.

The various Ambloplites species, which grow to a maximum overall length of 30–43 cm (12–17 in) and a maximum weight of 0.45–1.4 kg (0.99–3.09 lb), depending on species, are native to a region extending from the Hudson Bay basin in Canada to the lower Mississippi River basin in the United States.

== Etymology ==
The generic name Ambloplites derives from the Greek αμβλύς (blunt) and οπλίτης (bearing a shield).

== Species ==
The currently recognized species in this genus are:

- Ambloplites ariommus Viosca, 1936 (shadow bass)
- Ambloplites cavifrons Cope, 1868 (Roanoke bass)
- Ambloplites constellatus Cashner & Suttkus, 1977 (Ozark bass)
- Ambloplites rupestris (Rafinesque, 1817) (rock bass)
