= Troth (surname) =

Troth is a surname. Notable people with the surname include:

- Al Troth (1930–2012), American fisherman
- Doris Troth Lippman (fl. 1967–present), American professor of nursing
- Henry Troth (1859–1945), American photographer
- Paul Troth (quarterback) (born 1982), American college football quarterback
- Paul Troth (American football coach) (born c. 1962), American football coach
