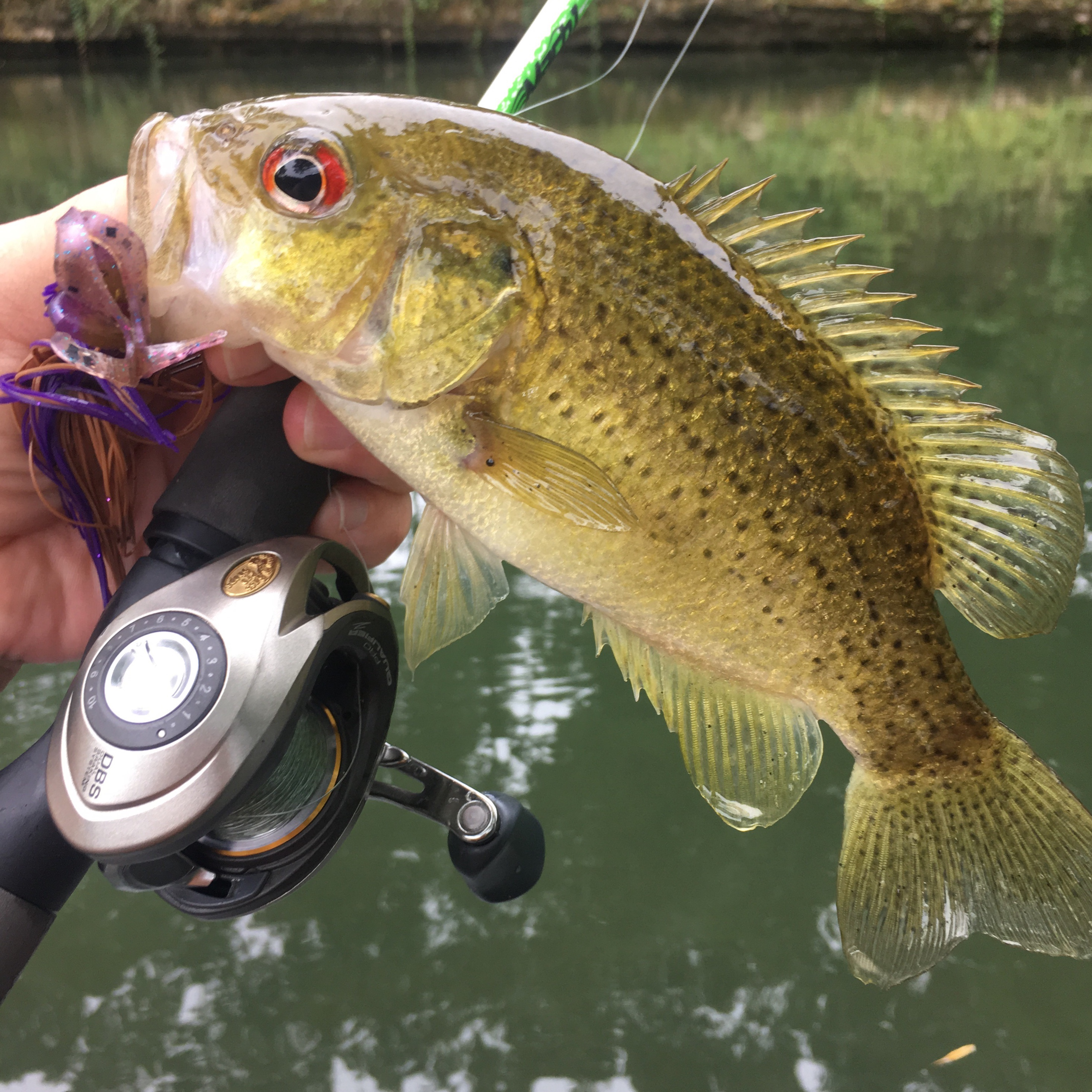
- Caught and released specimen at the James River, Missouri

Conservation status
- Least Concern (IUCN 3.1)

- Apparently Secure (NatureServe)

Scientific classification
- Kingdom: Animalia
- Phylum: Chordata
- Class: Actinopterygii
- Order: Centrarchiformes
- Family: Centrarchidae
- Genus: Ambloplites
- Species: A. constellatus

Binomial name
- Ambloplites constellatus Cashner & Suttkus, 1977

= Ozark bass =

Species of fish

The Ozark bass (Ambloplites constellatus) is a species of freshwater fish in the sunfish family (Centrarchidae) of order Centrarchiformes. It is native only to the White River, Sac River, James River, and Pomme de Terre River drainages of Missouri and Arkansas. The species is commonly referred to as "goggle-eye".

== Description ==
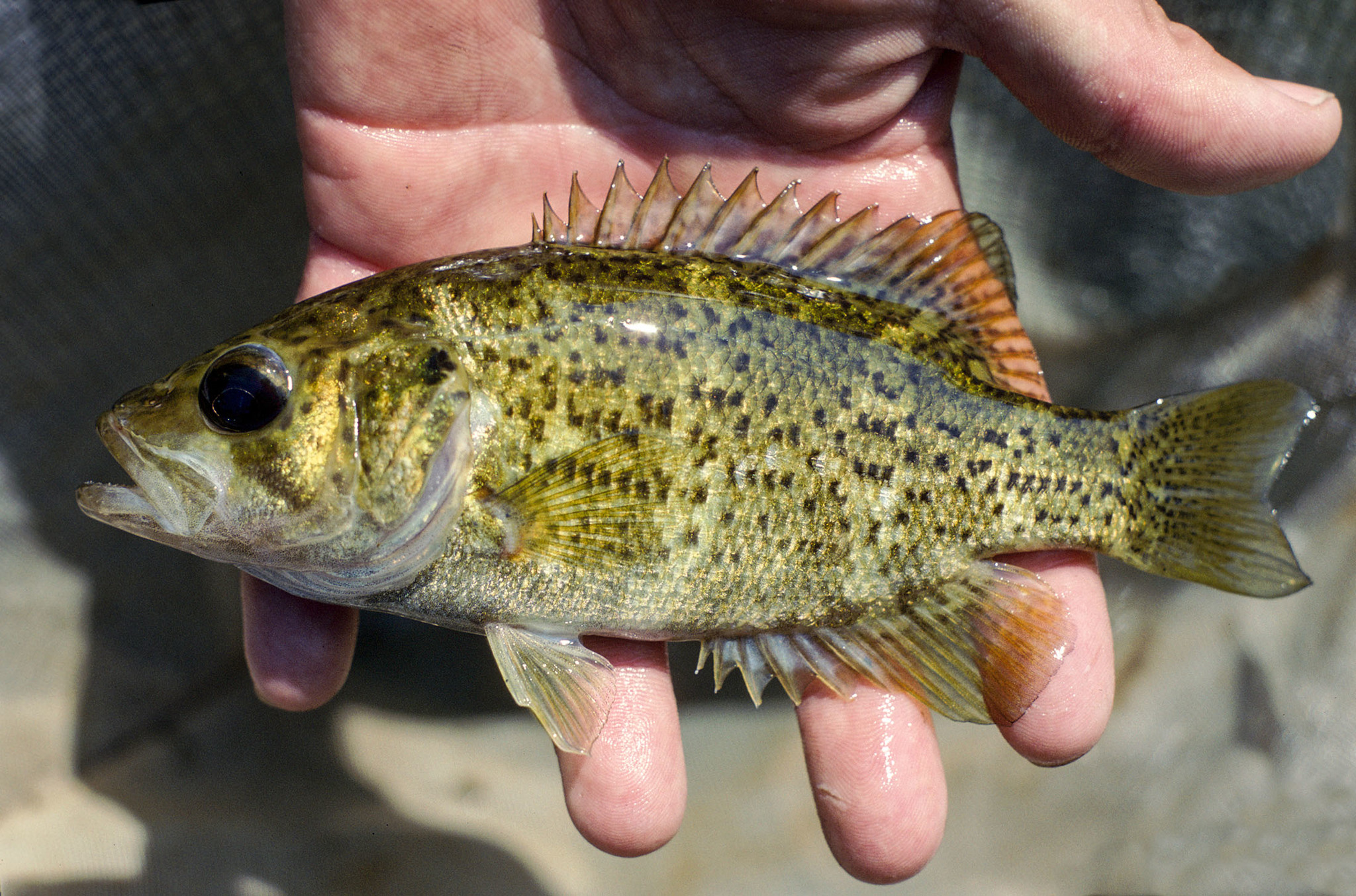
At Buffalo National River, Arkansas

The Ozark bass is a comparatively slender species of rock bass with a large eye which has a red iris. The brownish-green body has an irregular pattern of black speckling. This species attains a maximum total length of 27.9 centimeters (11.0 in), but they are normally around 13.3 centimeters (5.2 in) and the maximum published weight is 450 grams (0.99 lb).

== Distribution ==
The Ozark bass is native to the Ozarks upland reaches of the White River system in Missouri and Arkansas. They have been introduced elsewhere but have failed to establish populations in those areas.

== Habitat and biology ==
The Ozark bass occurs in creeks and small to medium permanent rivers with high levels of dissolved oxygen, plentiful aquatic vegetation, low turbidity, and sand or rocky beds substrates, with a preference for clear rocky pools close to the banks, boulders, or submerged wood. Males create nests in gravel or small stone substrates, and these are normally situated around a meter of cover. Spawning starts when the water temperature reaches 17 °C (63 °F). The male excavates a nest in sand or gravel which is 20–25 centimeters (8–10 in) in diameter at depths of 30–150 centimeters (1–5 ft). The females lay eggs in the nest, and the male guards the nest until the fry depart.

== Relationship with humans ==
They are a popular game fish in small streams and rivers. The IGFA world record for the species is a two-way tie with fish weighing 0.45 kg (1 lb 0 oz) caught from Bull Shoals Lake in Arkansas and the James River in Missouri.
