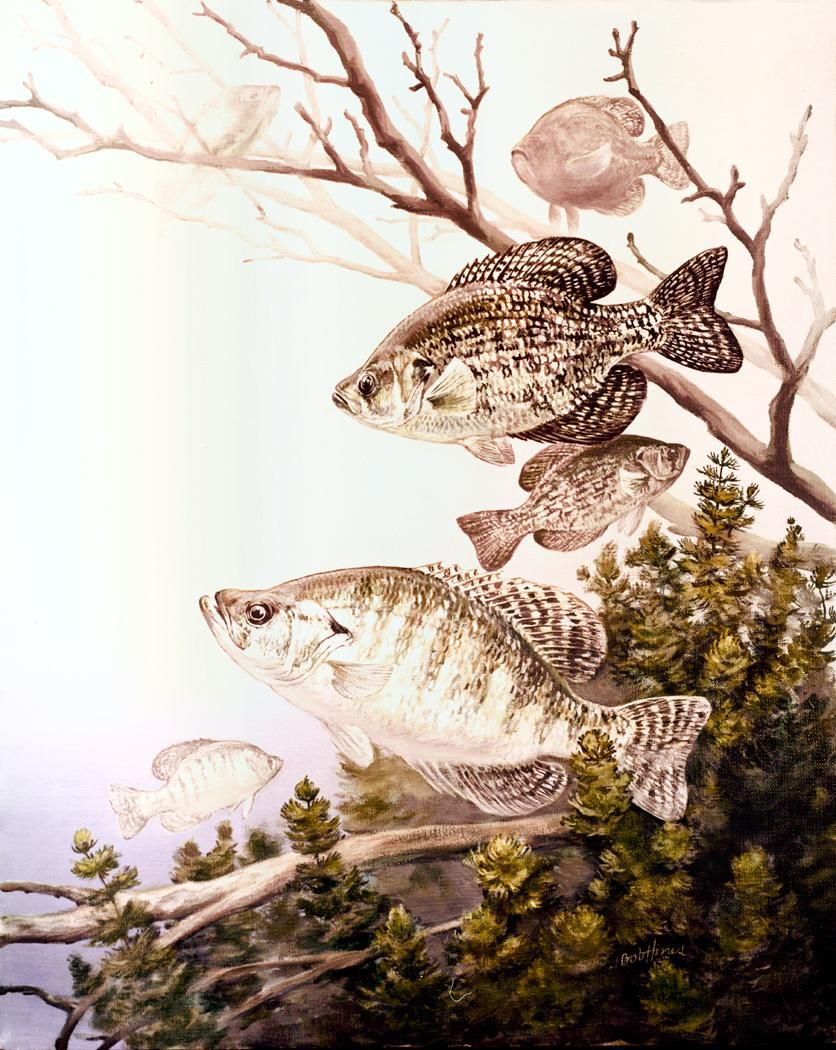
- Black (top) and white crappie (P. nigromaculatus & P. annularis)

Scientific classification
- Kingdom: Animalia
- Phylum: Chordata
- Class: Actinopterygii
- Division: Teleostei
- Order: Centrarchiformes
- Family: Centrarchidae
- Subfamily: Centrarchinae
- Genus: Pomoxis; Rafinesque, 1818

Type species
- Pomoxis annularis Rafinesque, 1818

Synonyms
- Hyperistius Gill, 1864

= Crappie =

Crappie Temporal range: Middle Miocene to present

Common name for two species of game fish

Crappies (/ˈkrɒpi, ˈkræpi/) are two species of North American freshwater fish of the genus Pomoxis in the family Centrarchidae (sunfishes). Both species of crappies are popular game fish among recreational anglers.

== Etymology ==
The genus name Pomoxis literally means "sharp cover", referring to the fish's spiny gill covers (opercular bones). It is composed of the Greek poma (πῶμα, cover) and oxys (ὀξύς, "sharp").

The common name (also spelled croppie or crappé) derives from the Canadian French crapet, which refers to many different fishes of the sunfish family. Other names for crappie are papermouths, strawberry bass, speckled bass or specks (especially in Michigan), speckled perch, white perch, crappie bass, calico bass (throughout the Middle Atlantic states and New England), and Oswego bass.

In Louisiana, it is called sacalait (Cajun French: sac-à-lait, lit. 'milk bag'), seemingly an allusion to its milky white flesh or silvery skin. The supposed French meaning is, however, folk etymology, because the word is ultimately from Choctaw sakli, meaning "trout".

== Species ==
The currently recognized species in this genus are:

Image	Species	Common name	Distribution
	P. annularis Rafinesque, 1818	White crappie	Great Lakes, Hudson Bay, and the Mississippi River basins expanding from New York and southern Ontario westward to South Dakota and southward to Texas.
	P. nigromaculatus (Lesueur, 1829)	Black crappie	eastern United States and Canada

The extinct fossil species †Pomoxis lanei Hibbard, 1936 (common name "Ogallala crappie") is known from a single well-preserved specimen recovered from Late Miocene-aged sediments of the Ogallala Formation of Kansas. An undescribed fossil Pomoxis (known as the "Wakeeney crappie") is also known from more fragmentary remains recovered from older Middle Miocene-aged sediments of the formation, representing the earliest record of the genus.

== Biology ==
Both species of crappie as adults feed predominantly on smaller fish species, including the young of their own predators (which include the northern pike, muskellunge, and walleye). They have diverse diets, however, including zooplankton, insects, and crustaceans. Larval crappies rely on crustacean zooplankton as a food source. The availability of zooplankton can have an effect on larval populations. By day, crappie tend to be less active and concentrate around weed beds or submerged objects, such as logs and boulders. They feed during dawn and dusk, by moving into open water or approaching the shore.

Hybrid crappie (Pomoxis annularis × nigromaculatus) have been cultured and occur naturally. The crossing of a black crappie female and white crappie male has better survival and growth rates among offspring than the reciprocal cross does. Hybrid crappie are difficult to distinguish from black crappie by appearance alone. Fingerling yields are variable in culture. The hybrid offspring are fertile, black crappie female and white crappie male crosses more so than the reciprocal.

== Fishing ==
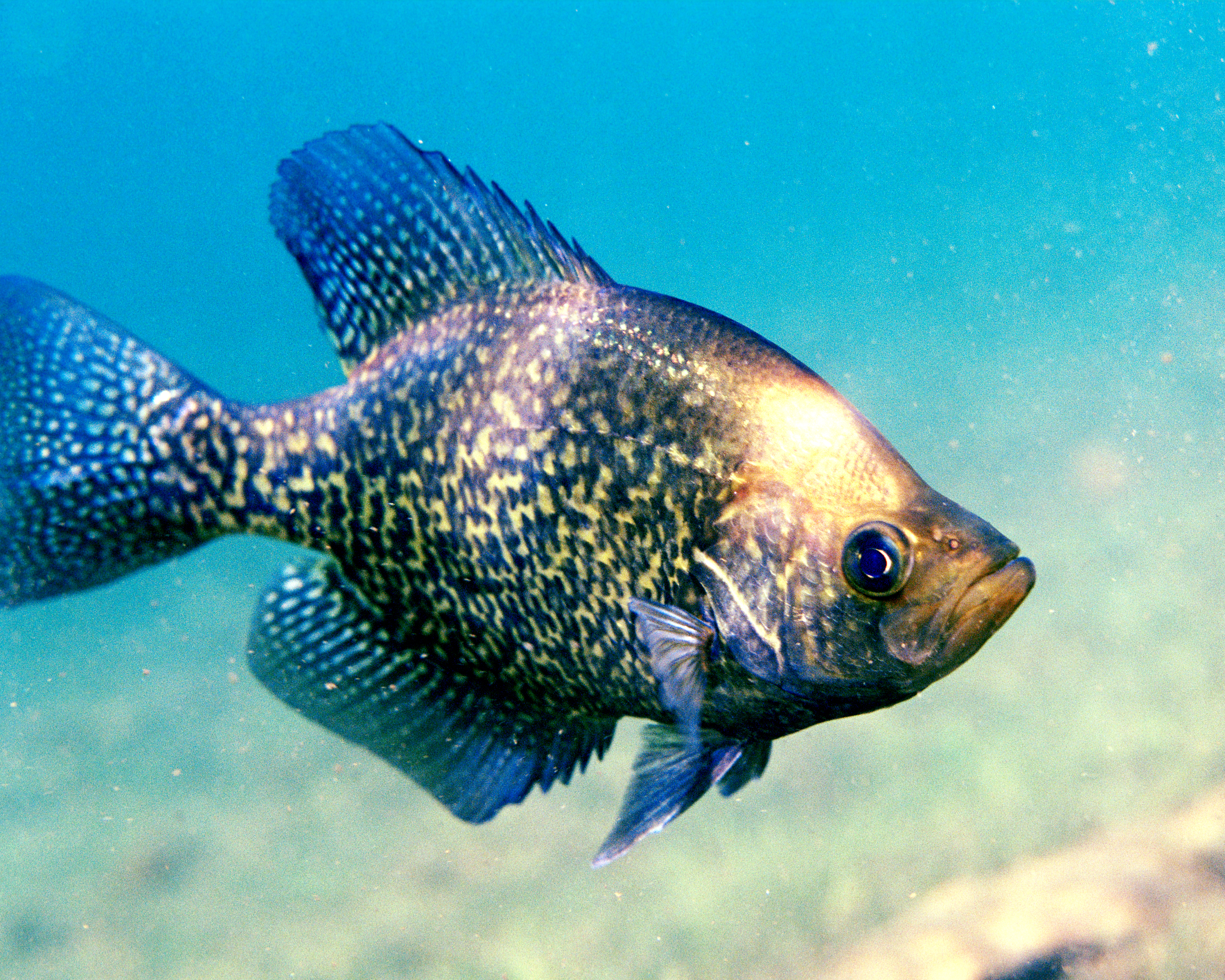
A black crappie (P. nigromaculatus)

The Pomoxis species are highly regarded panfish and are often considered to be among the best-tasting freshwater food fish. Because of their diverse diets, crappie may be caught in many ways, including casting light jigs, trolling with minnows or soft lures, using small spinnerbaits, or using bobbers with common hookbaits. Crappies are also popular with ice anglers, as they are active in winter.

=== Angling ===
Angling for crappie is popular throughout much of North America. Methods vary, but among the most popular is called "spider rigging", a method characterized by a fisherman in a boat with many long fishing rods pointing away from the angler at various angles like spokes from a wheel. Spider rigging is not permitted on some waters. In Minnesota, for example, a fisherman may use only one rod during the open water season. Anglers who employ the spider rigging method may choose from among many popular baits, some of the most popular are plastic jigs with lead jigheads, crankbaits or live minnows. Many anglers also chum or dump live groundbait into the water to attract the fish to bite their bait. Crappies are also regularly targeted and caught during the spawning period by fly fishermen, and can be taken from frozen ponds and lakes in winter by ice fishing.

=== Conservation ===
In 2023, apparel company Crappie Forever announced a promotion in which it would award prizes to those catching and releasing tagged crappie in certain Mississippi lakes, in order to further crappie conservation and enthusiasm for tournament fishing.

=== Commercial fishing ===
Before state fisheries departments began to implement more restrictive, conservation-minded regulations, a great number of crappies, especially in the Mississippi River states, were harvested commercially in the 19th and early 20th centuries. At one point, the annual crappie catch sold at fish markets in the United States was reported to be about 3 million pounds (1,400 t).

A commercial fishery for crappies existed at Reelfoot Lake in Tennessee until 2003. It was one of the few commercial fisheries for crappies in recent decades.

== Fishing records ==
According to the International Game Fish Association, the current all-tackle world records are:

- Black crappie: 2.47 kg (5 lb 7 oz), caught by Lionel "Jam" Ferguson at Richeison Pond in Tennessee on 15 May 2018
- White crappie: 2.35 kg (5 lb 3 oz), caught by Fred Brigh at Enid Dam, Mississippi on 31 July 1957
