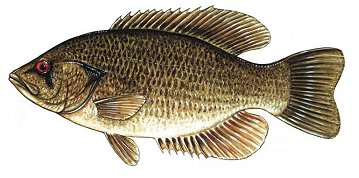

Conservation status
- Least Concern (IUCN 3.1)

- Secure (NatureServe)

Scientific classification
- Kingdom: Animalia
- Phylum: Chordata
- Class: Actinopterygii
- Order: Centrarchiformes
- Family: Centrarchidae
- Genus: Ambloplites
- Species: A. rupestris

Binomial name
- Ambloplites rupestris (Rafinesque, 1817)
- native range

Synonyms
- Bodianus rupestris Rafinesque, 1817

= Rock bass =

Species of freshwater fish

The rock bass (Ambloplites rupestris), also known as the rock perch, goggle-eye, red eye, and black perch, is a freshwater fish native to east-central North America. This red-eyed fish is a species of freshwater fish in the sunfish family (Centrarchidae) of order Centrarchiformes and can be distinguished from other similar species by the six spines in the anal fin (other sunfish have only three anal fin spines).

== Distribution ==
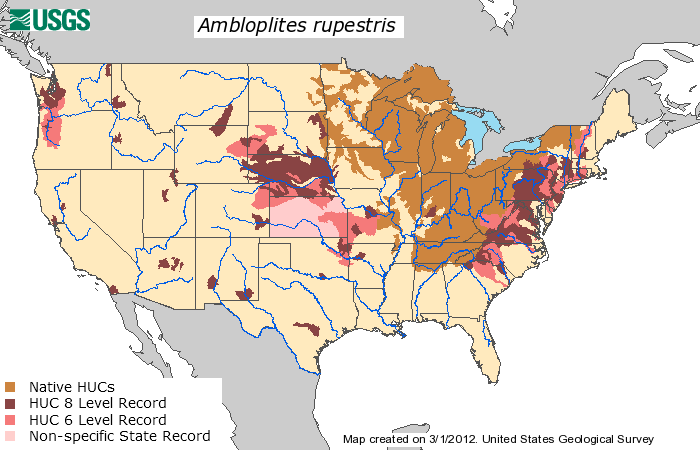
Native and introduced ranges in the United States

Rock bass are native to the St Lawrence River and Great Lakes system, the upper and middle Mississippi River basin in North America from Québec to Saskatchewan in the north down to Missouri and Arkansas, south to the Savannah River, and throughout the eastern U.S. from New York through Kentucky and Tennessee to the northern portions of Alabama and Georgia and Florida in the south. The rock bass has also been found in the Nueces River system in Texas. A population introduced to the Loire River in France between 1904 and 1910 is successfully self-sustaining, but not invasively expanding, more than 100 years later.

== Description ==
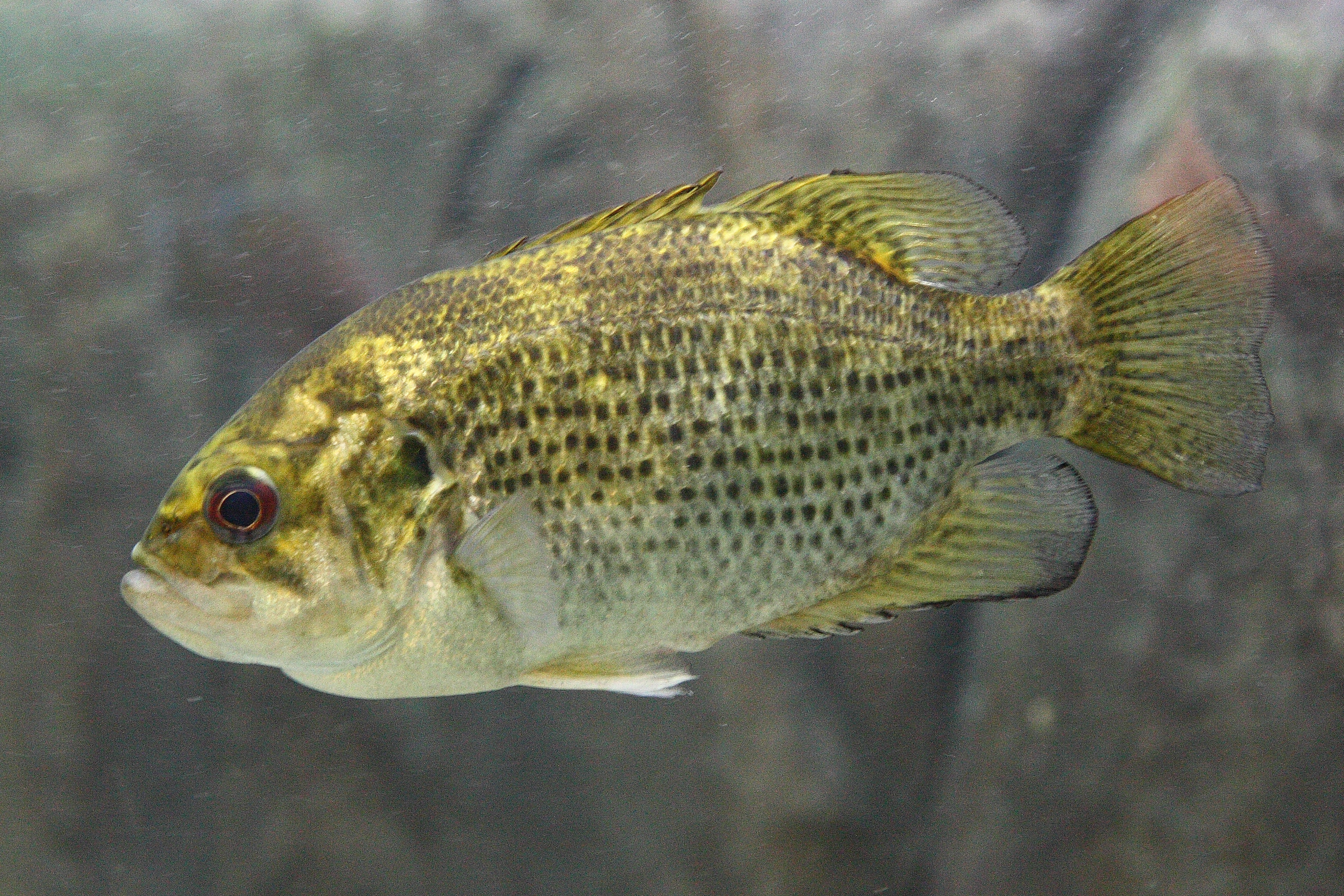
A. rupestris at a Quebec aquarium

They are similar in appearance to smallmouth bass, but are usually quite a bit smaller. Identifying characteristics of rock bass are their two dorsal fins that have spinous and soft-rayed united portions, a large mouth, six anal spines, red eyes; rows of dark dots on their sides. The mouth of a rock bass is located in the terminal position, below the snout, with small conical teeth to eat prey. The average rock bass is between 6 and 10 in (150 and 250 mm), and they rarely weigh over a pound. Few rock bass live beyond 10 to 12 years. A. rupestris, the largest and most common of the Ambloplites species, has reached a maximum recorded length of 43 cm (17 in), and a maximum recorded weight of 1.4 kg (3.1 lb). It can live as long as 10 years. These fish have body coloring from golden brown to olive with a white to silver colored belly and have the ability to rapidly change their color to match their surroundings. This chameleon-like trait allows them to thrive throughout their wide range.

== Habitat ==
Rock bass prefer clear, rocky, and vegetated stream pools and lake margins. Rocky banks of northeastern lakes and reservoirs are a common habitat for rock bass. Their favorite habitat contains some vegetation with rocky bottoms and cool to warm waters. Rock bass species are usually found near rocky shorelines. They can be surprisingly unflustered by the presence of human activity, living under lakeside docks and near swimming areas. Rock bass are frequently seen in groups, particularly near other sunfish.

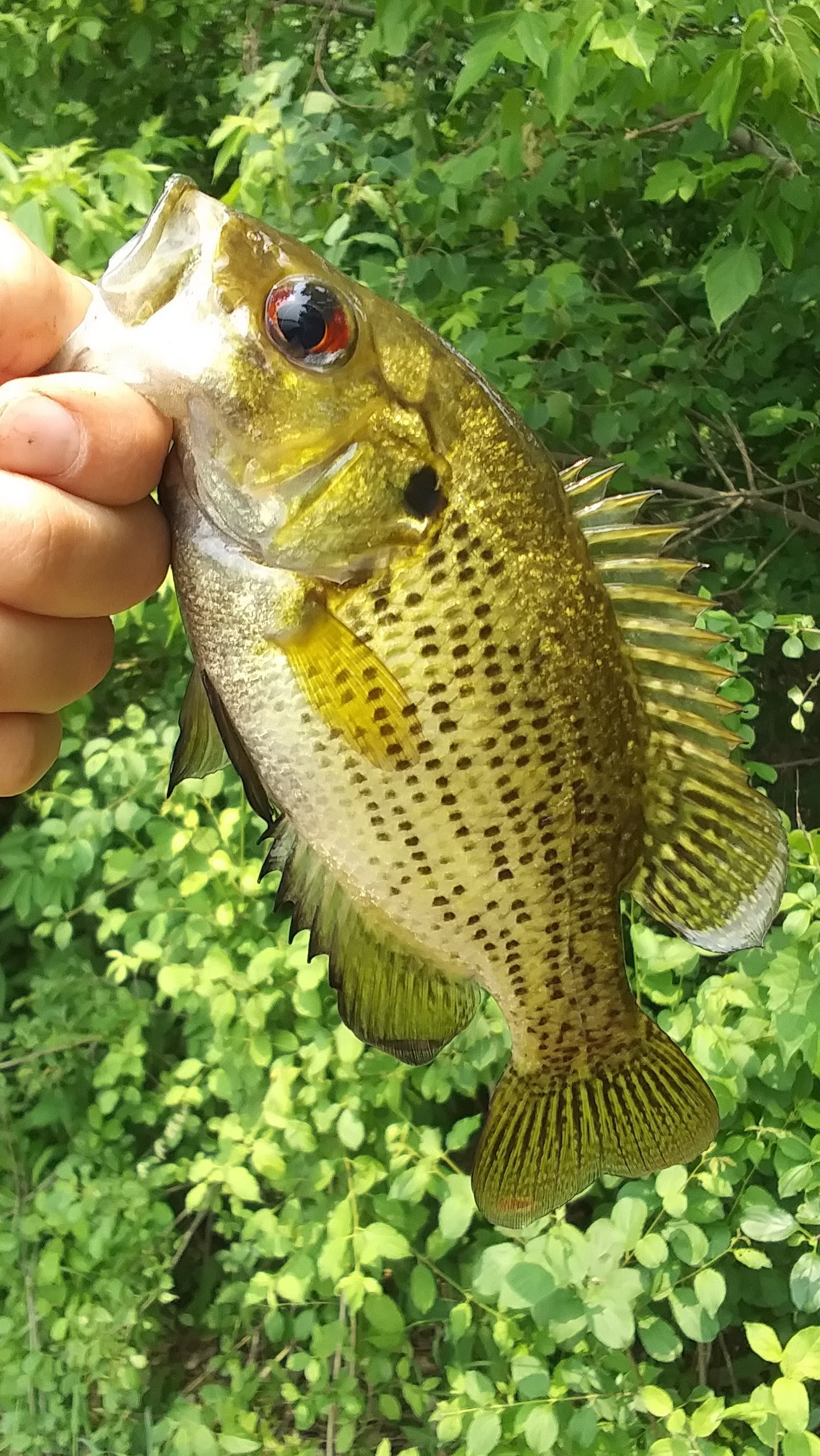
In Southeast Michigan

== Diet ==
Large bass, northern pike, muskie, and walleye prey on young rock bass. Rock bass compete with smallmouth bass for food. It is carnivorous, and its diet consists of smaller fish, including their own young at times, yellow perch, and minnows, as well as insects, and crustaceans. Rock bass are occasionally known to take food from the surface. Adult Rock bass may eat heavily, particularly in the evening and early in the morning.

== Reproduction ==
Rock bass are sexually mature at about two to three years of age. Rock bass are polygynandrous, in which both females and males have multiple mates during the breeding season. Spawning occurs from April to early June in warm waters ranging 12–15 °C (54–59 °F), with females laying from 2,000 to 11,000 eggs. Like other members of the sunfish family, the male will dig a nest near the lake shallows, and will aggressively guard it. A spawning area may be heavily used, with several other rock bass nests very close together. As a result, males can become quite aggressive as they attempt to defend territory and attract and hold females. Rock bass lack courtship displays, so the female enters the nest and joins the male in his circular behavior. Both the female and male simultaneously release their sperm and eggs into the nest. The male guards and fans the eggs, and later raises the young for a short time. Rock bass are known to grow quickly.

== Conservation ==
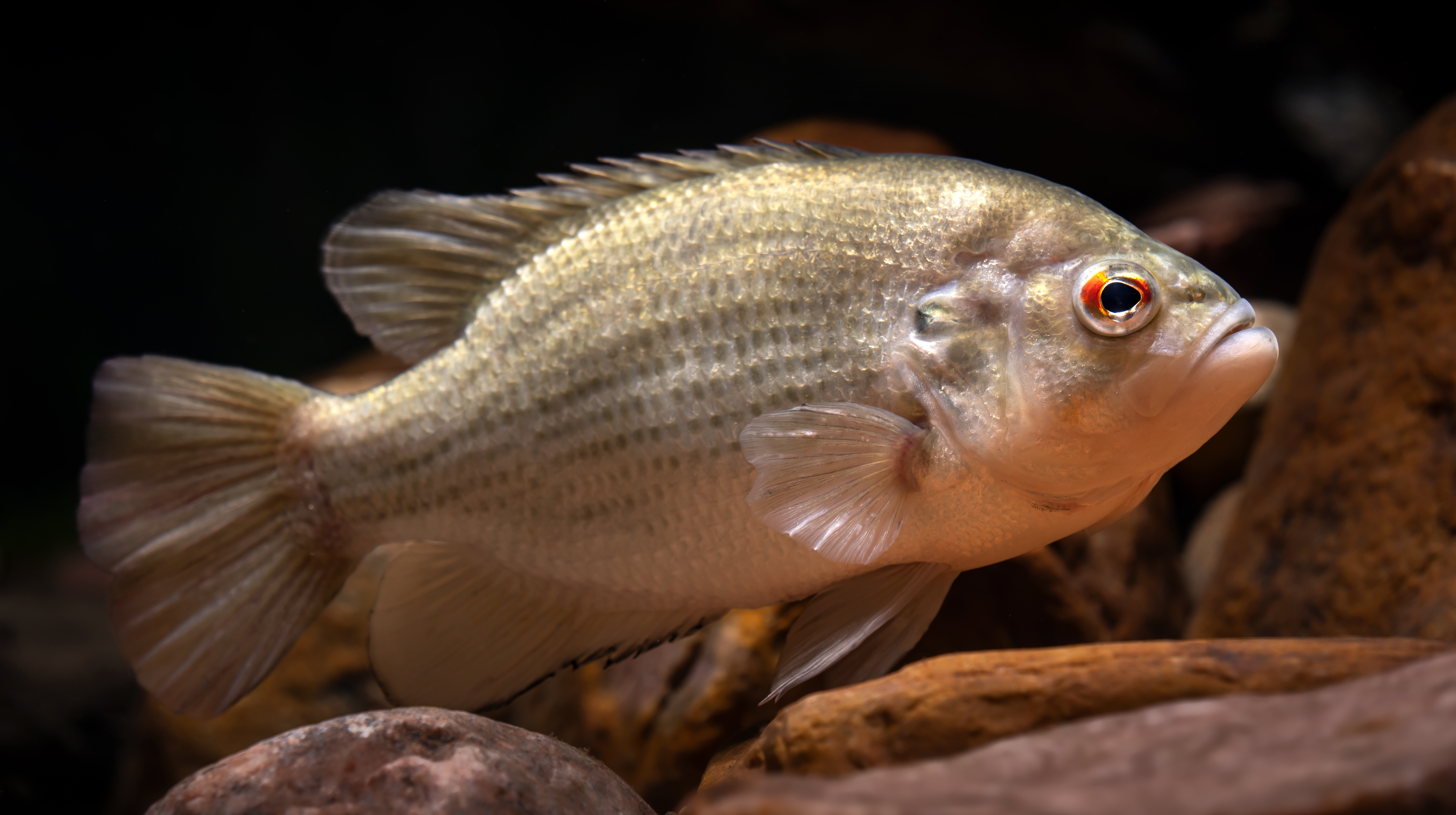
At Gavins Point National Fish Hatchery

Rock bass are successfully surviving in their environments and are listed as a species of "least concern" on the IUCN Red List. Based on their population stability, rock bass do not require any special monitoring or conservation management plans. As a sport fish, rock bass are managed to some extent by regulations. There are slot limits for rock bass on some bodies of water. Artificial nesting habitat or ponds can be employed to improve rock bass populations.

== IGFA records ==
Rock bass are considered game fish throughout much of their range, the IGFA all-tackle world record for the species is a tie between 1.36 kg (3 lb 0 oz) fish – one caught in the York River in Ontario, Canada, and one from Lake Erie in Pennsylvania, US, in 1974 and 1998 respectively.

== Misconceptions ==
Ambloplites constellatus (Ozark bass), a species of rock bass from the Ozark upland of Arkansas, and Ambloplites ariommus (shadow bass) are true rock bass, but regarded as separate species. Ambloplites rupestris is sometimes called the redeye or redeye bass in Canada, but this name refers more properly to Micropterus coosae, a distinct species of centrarchid native to parts of the American South. Rafinesque originally assigned the rock bass to Bodianus, a genus of marine wrasses (family Labridae).
