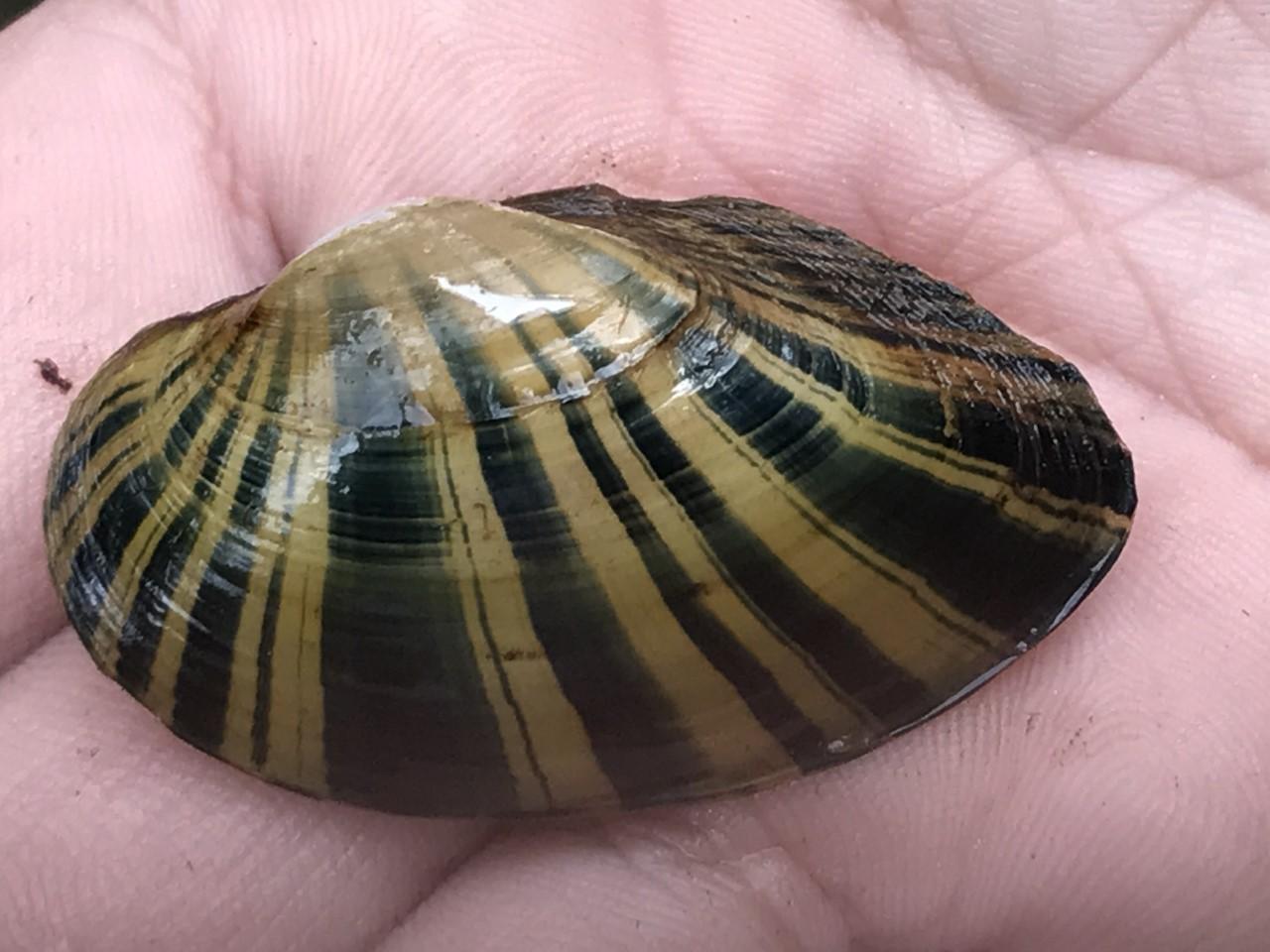

Conservation status
- Imperiled (NatureServe)

- Endangered (ESA)

Scientific classification
- Kingdom: Animalia
- Phylum: Mollusca
- Class: Bivalvia
- Order: Unionida
- Family: Unionidae
- Genus: Hamiota
- Species: H. subangulata

Binomial name
- Hamiota subangulata (I. Lea, 1840)
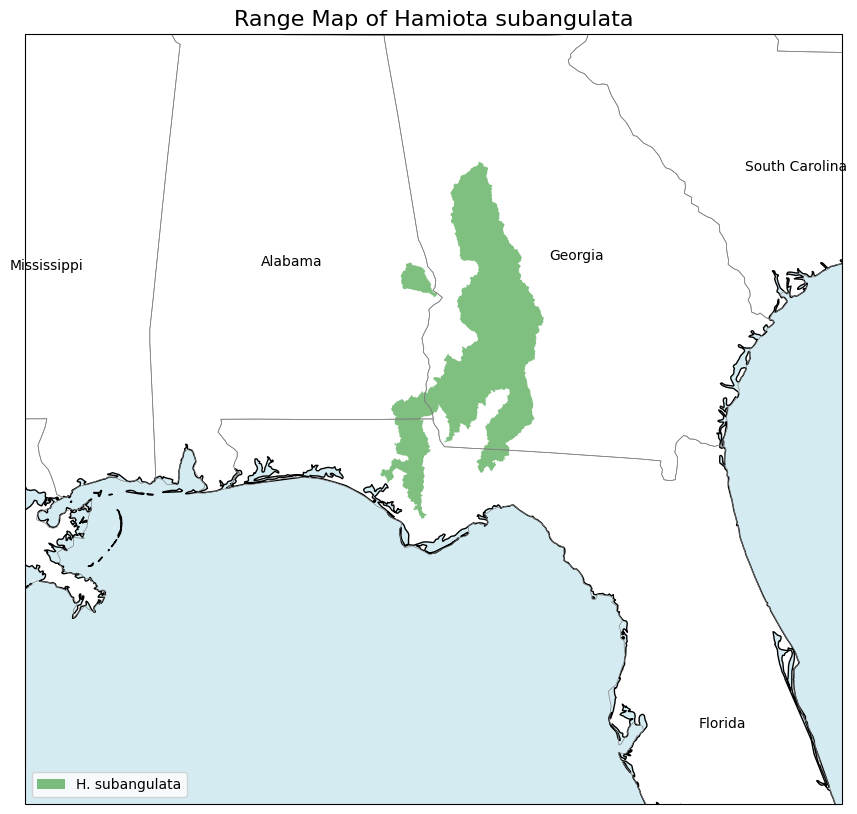

Synonyms
- List: Lampsilis subangulata (I. Lea, 1840); Lampsilis kirklandia (S.H. Wright, 1897); Lampsilis (Eurynia) kirklandiana (S.H. Wright, 1897); Lampsilis subangulata subsp. kirklandianus (S.H. Wright, 1897); Ligumia subangulata (I. Lea, 1840); Margaron (Unio) subangulatus (I. Lea, 1840); Unio kirklandianus S.H. Wright, 1897; Unio subangulatus I. Lea, 1840

= Shinyrayed pocketbook =

Species of bivalve

The shinyrayed pocketbook (Hamiota subangulata) is an endangered species of freshwater mussel in the family Unionidae, the river mussels. This species is endemic to the United States in the states of Georgia, Florida, and Alabama.

== Geography ==
The shinyrayed pocketbook historically occurred in 11 sub-basins and currently occupies Chipola, Middle and Lower Chattahoochee, Flint, Kinchafoonee, Ichawaynochaway, and Spring sub-basins. It was rediscovered in the Econfina sub-basin in 2006. A 12-year survey of the Ochlockonee River found no individuals and it is thought to be extirpated from this area.

== Taxonomy ==
The species was first described by I. Lea in 1840. It was placed in the Lampsilis genus by S.H. Wright in 1897. In 2005 the species was reclassified to the new Hamiota genus. Placement in the genus was based on characteristics such as a superconglutinate lure, placement and shape of the marsupia (gills), and release of larvae through the excurrent siphon.

The genus name Hamiota, from the Greek hamus, "to hook", refers to its use of an external lure to attract host fish for its larvae. The specific name subangulata, "sub-angular", likely refers to the shape of its shell which is more angular on the posterior side.

== Description ==
The shinyrayed pocketbook's shell is solid yet thin with a smooth and shiny surface. The shell is oval in shape and bluntly pointed, with a high umbo. They are sexually dimorphic. Males are more acutely pointed on the posterior end, and females are more inflated.

The coloring is light yellowish-brown with fairly wide, bright emerald green rays over the entire length of the shell. The coloring may appear as darker brown in older specimens. The nacre is white or salmon-colored.

== Habitat and ecology ==
It is found in freshwater streams and large rivers with coarse or silty sand and gravel substrates in moderate to slow currents.

Like most freshwater mussels, it is a mainly sedentary filter-feeder. Oxygen and food are obtained by siphoning which provides phytoplankton, tiny zooplankton, and organic detritus. Its lifespan is unknown.

== Reproduction ==
=== Fertilization ===
They are bradytictic (long-term) breeders, which fertilize eggs in late summer, and release larvae the following spring or early summer. Gravid (pregnant) females have been found from December through August, and are identified by their swollen outer gills with dark pigmentation.

Males release sperm into the water, which females draw in with the water current. After the eggs are fertilized, brooding occurs within the female mussel's shell as the eggs develop into the larval stage known as glochidia. The glochidia are brooded in the water-tubes of the gills until mature and ready for a host.

=== Lure and host fish ===
To attract a host fish for her larvae, the female releases a superconglutinate lure through the excurrent siphon. The superconglutinate lure is a mass which contains all the larvae, the entire reproductive effort for the year. It generally has an eye spot and lateral band resembling a small fish. This mass remains tethered to the female by a long, transparent, mucous strand. The lure displays a darting motion in the water that mimics a small fish. When captured by a host fish, a cloud of larvae is released and become attached to the host fish's gills. The strand may become detached from the female and be found snagged on debris, where it continues to show darting motion that may attract host fish.

These superconglutinates have been observed in April through September. The female has also been observed using a mantle-fluttering lure, possibly an adaptation to low current flow.

The shinyrayed pocketbook is a host specialist, meaning it requires a specific kind of fish. Primary host fish are three species of Micropterus: shoal bass, redeye bass, and largemouth bass. The glochidia achieved 78% success in metamophosing on these fish in one study. Micropterus punctulatus (spotted bass), an introduced species, is also a highly successful host. Other fish such as eastern mosquitofish, guppy, and bluegill were observed to successfully host the larvae, but were not as effective as black bass species.

=== Relation to environment ===
Environmental factors may heavily affect mussels' recruitment (successful breeding and survival of young), and lack of recruitment is identified as a major threat to mussels' survival. Recruitment in shinyrayed pocketbooks was found to be related to water flow in their river environment. Higher recruitment was associated with "median summer discharge, maximum 10-day summer discharge, and minimum 10-day spring and summer discharge", suggesting that management of river flow could be an important factor in conservation and survival of this and other species, but further study is needed.

== Conservation ==
In March, 1998, the U.S. Fish and Wildlife Service published a determination listing the shinyrayed pocketbook as Endangered under the Endangered Species Act, noting that populations had significantly declined from those in historical records. It was found in only 21% of historical sites.

Mussels in much of the Apalachicolan Region, including the shinyrayed pocketbook, have been negatively impacted by impoundments, siltation from agricultural erosion, channelization, and water pollution. There has been a noted lack of reproduction in many historical sites. Populations have been isolated due to major impoundments on the Apalachicola, Flint, and Ochlockonee rivers. In the 20th century, mussels were often collected for the cultured pearl industry, though this is no longer in practice. Their slow growth and very specific reproduction requirements can be a challenge to recovery. The introduced Asian clam and zebra mussel also pose threats to the species.

In a 5-year review in 2019, the FWS found that the status of the shinyrayed pocketbook had improved since the original listing. Spring Creek, Chiploa, and to a smaller extent, Lower Chattahoochee populations showed evidence of recruitment and increasing population. An additional population was discovered in Econfina, though the species was no longer found in the Ochlockonee sub-basin. However, these developments were not enough to warrant a change in the endangered status.
