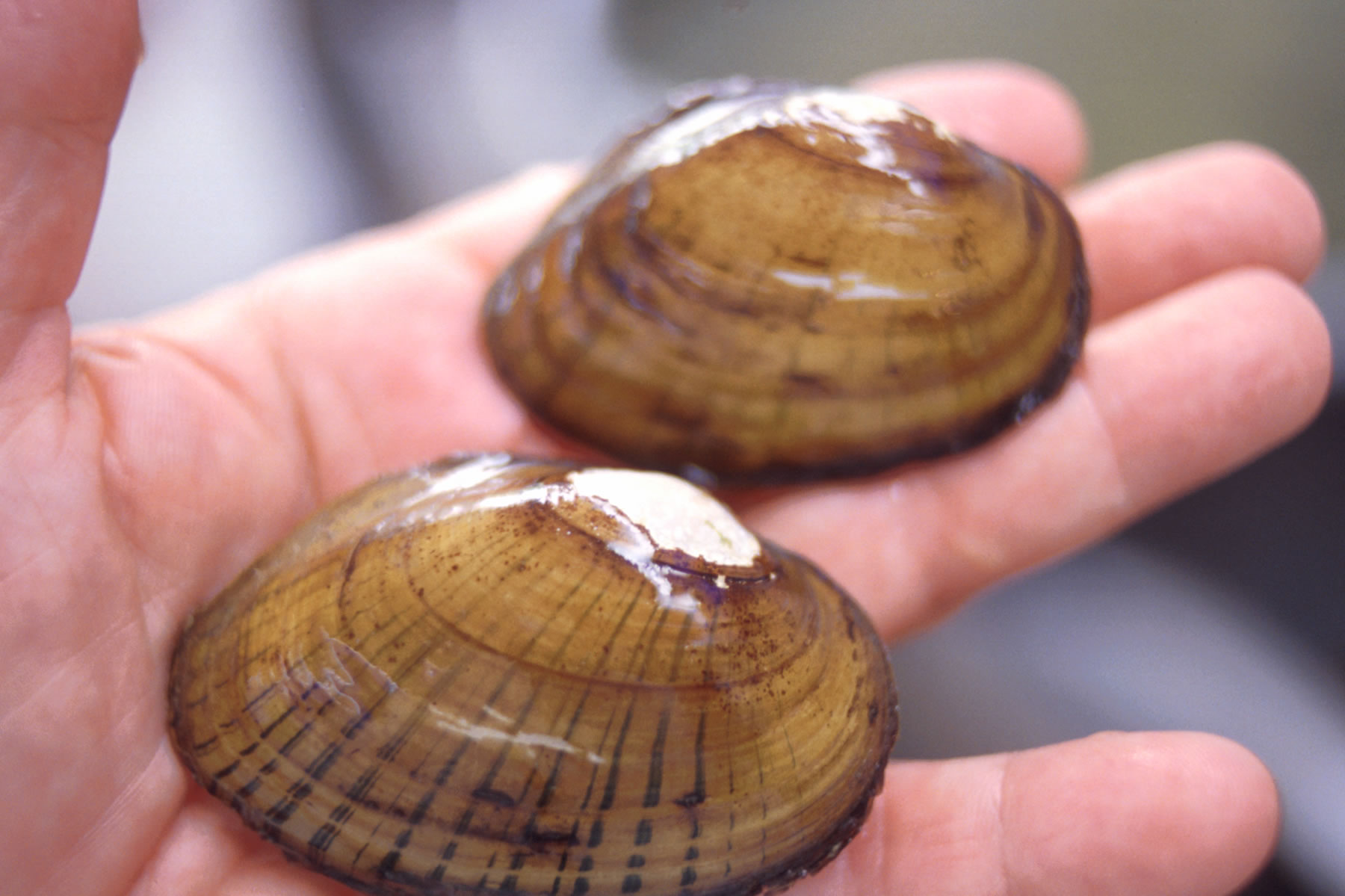

Conservation status
- Endangered (IUCN 3.1)

- Vulnerable (NatureServe)

Scientific classification
- Kingdom: Animalia
- Phylum: Mollusca
- Class: Bivalvia
- Order: Unionida
- Family: Unionidae
- Genus: Hamiota
- Species: H. altilis

Binomial name
- Hamiota altilis (Conrad, 1834)
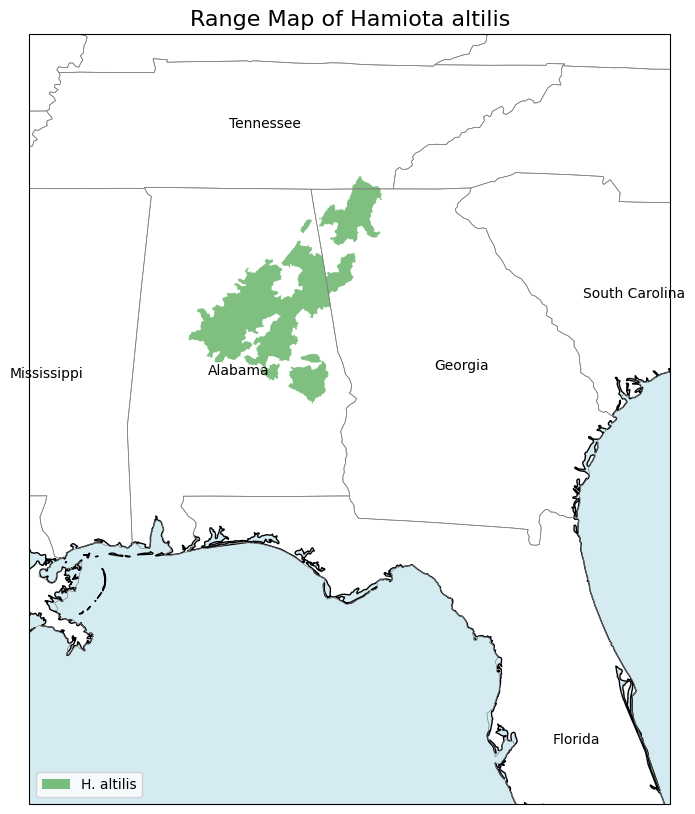

Synonyms
- Lampsilis altilis (Conrad, 1834)

= Hamiota altilis =

Species of bivalve

Hamiota altilis, the finelined pocketbook, is a species of freshwater mussel, an aquatic bivalve mollusk in the family Unionidae, the river mussels.

This species is endemic to the U.S. states of Georgia, Alabama, and Tennessee. It is a threatened species in the United States.

== Taxonomy ==
The species was first described by Timothy Abbott Conrad as Unio altilis in 1834 from the Alabama River. It was considered part of the Lampsilis genus for most of the 20th century, and was placed in the new genus Hamiota in 2005. Placement in the genus was based on characteristics such as a superconglutinate lure, placement and shape of the marsupia (gills), and release of larvae through the excurrent siphon. Historically, it has often been listed as Lampsilis clarkiana.

The genus name Hamiota, from the Greek hamus, "to hook", refers to its use of an external lure to attract host fish for its larvae, while the Latin altilis means "fattened".

== Geography ==
The species has historically occupied the Mobile River basin, including the Alabama, Tombigbee, Black Warrior, and Tallapoosa river drainages. This mussel has disappeared from most main rivers and is limited to the Tallapoosa River and tributaries, and the Conasauga and Coosa rivers.

The Alabama Department of Conservation and Natural Resources has successfully reintroduced a population to Little River in Alabama. In a 2019, the Tallapoosa River and upper Coosa River basin populations were considered robust. However, most populations are small and localized.

== Description ==
The finelined pocketbook is somewhat oval in shape and reaches around 10 cm (4 in) as an adult. The color of the shell is yellow-brown to blackish, with fine rays on the posterior side. The nacre is white and somewhat iridescent. Females are more pointed on the posterior side.

Compared to the orangenacre mucket, the finelined pocketbook has a thinner shell, is more elongated with a pointed posterior, and has a white nacre and rays on the shell.

The mantle flap is red or brown, and in females is spotted, with a dark "eye" spot. This flap acts as a lure by which she can attract host fish.

== Habitat ==
The species requires free-flowing streams with clear water free from pollution and sedimentation. It lives in sand or gravel shoals in small to medium streams and rivers with moderate to strong currents.

== Life cycle ==
It is mainly sedentary, partially burying itself in stream bottoms. Like other species of Unionidae, it likely feeds on zooplankton and organic detritus by siphoning the water. It can live up to 15 years.

The sexes are separate, and the male releases sperm into the water, which is taken in by the female's siphon. The species is bradytictic, meaning they hold their eggs over the winter. Gravid (pregnant) females have been found from March to June. The female releases a mucous-encased package of larvae resembling a small minnow, which she uses to lure host fish for her parasitic larva (glochidia). The package, called a superconglutinate, is attached to the female or to a substrate by a long mucous tether, so that it darts in the water like a fish.

In addition to the superconglutinate, the species may also use a mantle lure, in which part of the female's body resembling a small fish protrudes from the shell as a lure. H. altilis has the most developed mantle lure of the genus.

Host fish for the finelined pocketbook have been identified as redeye bass (Micropterus coosa), spotted bass ((Micropterus punctulatus), largemouth bass ((Micropterus salmoides), and green sunfish (Lepomis cyanellus).

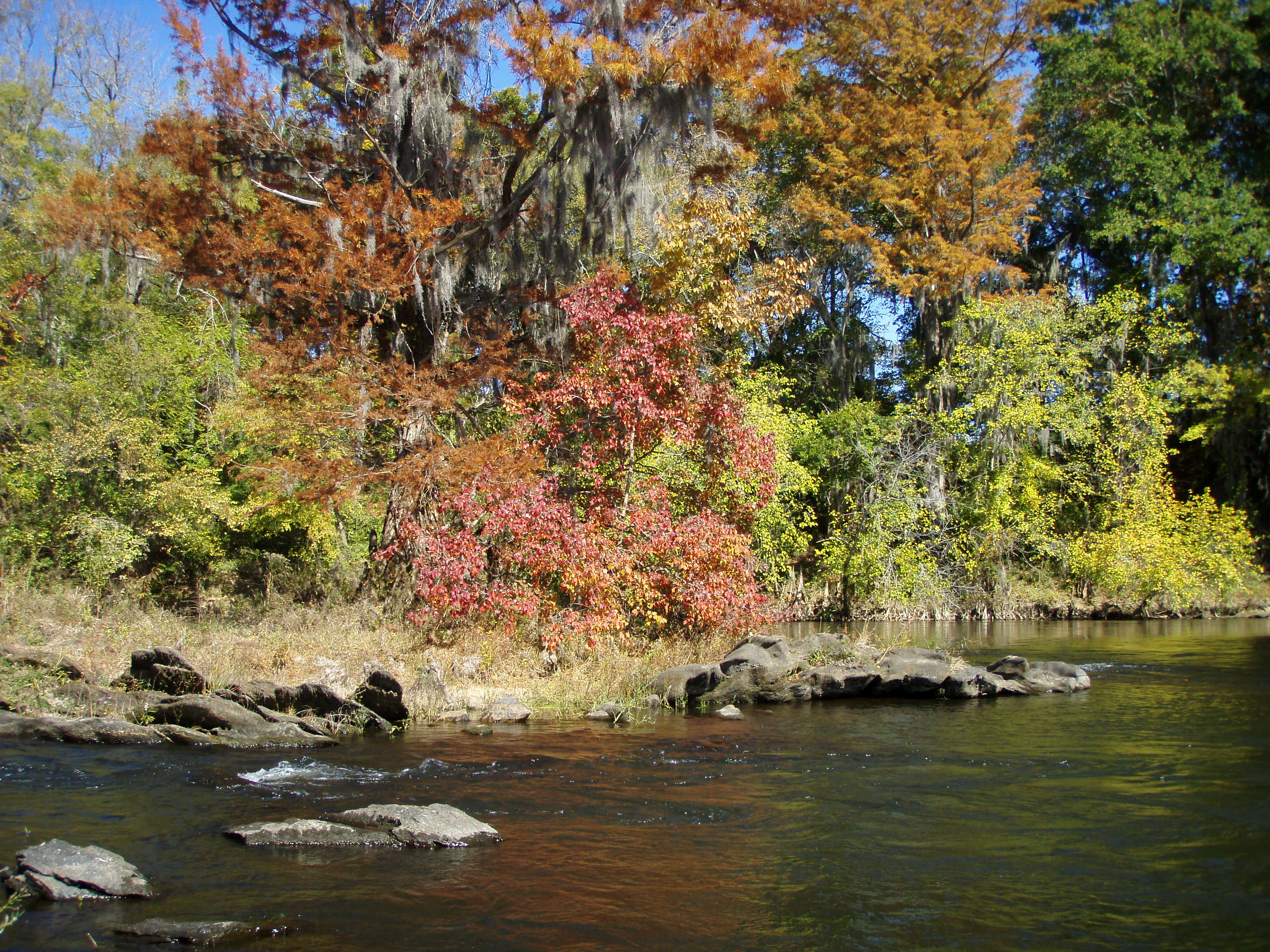
The Coosa River in Alabama

== Conservation ==
Hamiota altilis is listed as endangered by the IUCN Red List, G3 Vulnerable by NatureServe, and Threatened under the Endangered Species Act.

The finelined pocketbook was listed as a threatened species in the United States in 1993, and critical habitat was established in 2004. Major threats to the species are dams and other alteration of river systems, sedimentation, debris removal, and water pollution. More than 1,700 km (1,100 mi) of the Mobile River basin are impounded by small and large dams, a 700 km increase since 1993. Sedimentation and reduced water flow due to dams cause suffocation, decreased oxygen levels and food supply in the river, and change the habitat. Changes affect host fish which mussels rely on to reproduce. Dam construction also isolates populations, making it impossible for populations to form in new areas due to the physical barrier. Pollution from agriculture and mining is a major problem in the Black Warrior River, and may have contributed to its extinction there. Dams and dredging of the Alabama River have affected mussel populations in that area. 230 miles of the Coosa River have been impounded by at least six dams. The Cahaba River is affected by issues including municipal wastewater and surface mining.

The small populations are in danger of being wiped out by a catastrophic event like extreme weather or pollution spills, and there is likely loss of genetic diversity due to fragmentation of the populations. Predation by muskrats, while natural, may affect small localized populations. Climate change may cause droughts, increased water temperature, or other effects that may impact habitat.

Freshwater mussels are highly sensitive to pollutants such as chlorine, ammonia, heavy metals, and high levels of nitrogen and phosphorus. These pollutants enter the stream through agricultural run-off and municipal and industrial wastewater and can cause suffocation and algal blooms that alter the habitat.

Fortunately, a 5-year review by US Fish and Wildlife Service in 2019 noted discovery of two new populations, including a "substantial, reproducing" population in Gilmer County, Georgia. This as well as some dam removal projects within its habitat, and improved flow from the Weiss Dam on the Coosa River, allowed the species to be classified as "Improving".
