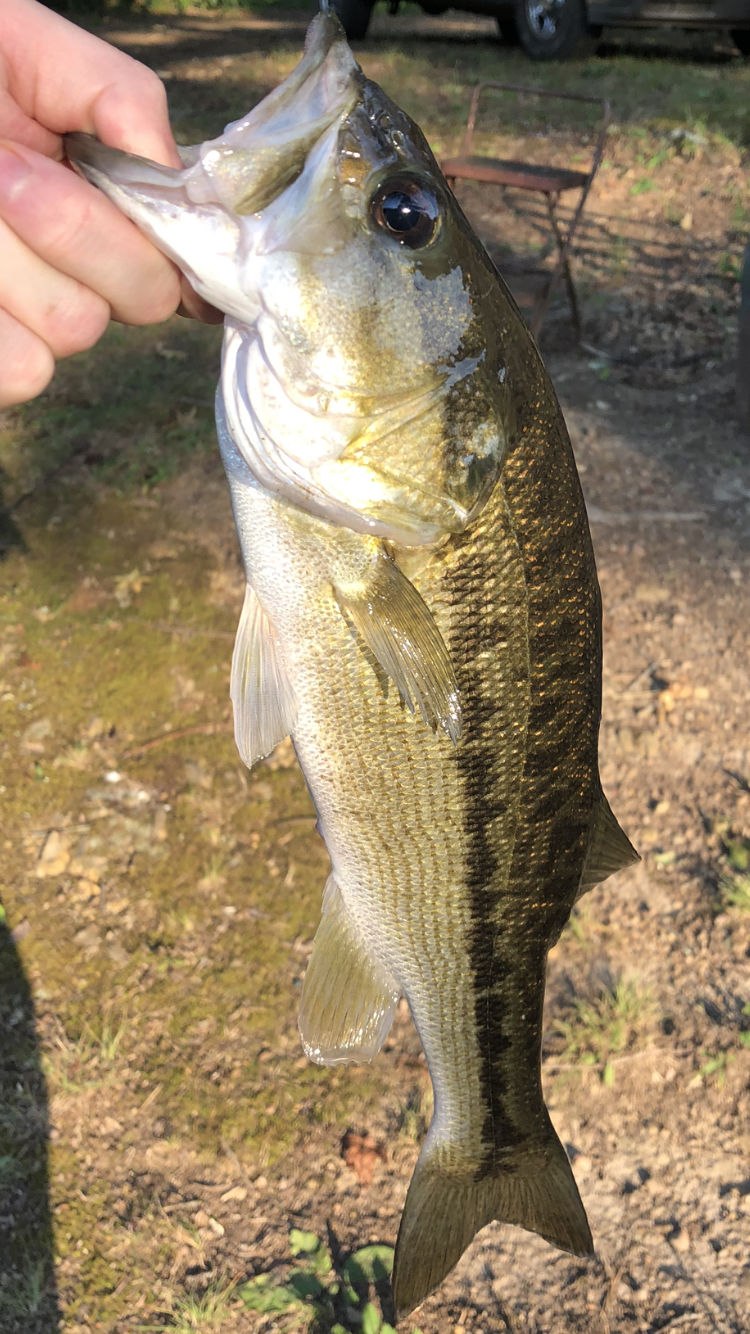

Conservation status
- Least Concern (IUCN 3.1)

Scientific classification
- Kingdom: Animalia
- Phylum: Chordata
- Class: Actinopterygii
- Order: Centrarchiformes
- Family: Centrarchidae
- Genus: Micropterus
- Species: M. henshalli

Binomial name
- Micropterus henshalli Hubbs & Bailey, 1940
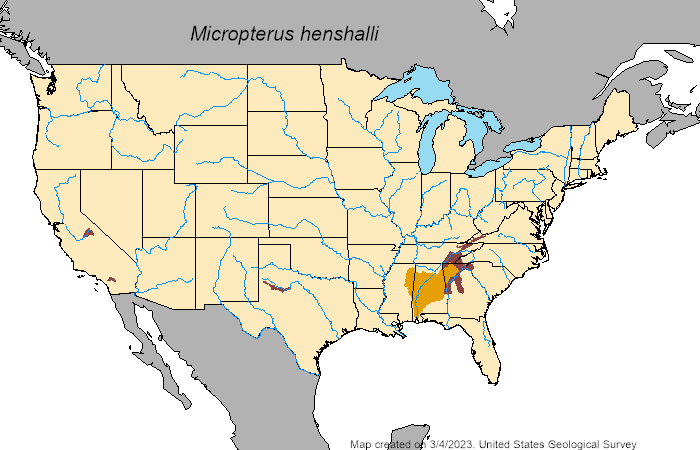
- Distribution map of the Alabama bass. Yellow represents native and purple represents where it has been introduced.

= Alabama bass =

Species of ray-finned fish

Micropterus henshalli, the Alabama bass, is a medium-sized freshwater ray finned fish, a black bass from the genus Micropterus which is part of the sunfish family Centrarchidae. This species is endemic to the southeastern United States where it is native to the rivers which drain into Mobile Bay in Florida, Alabama, Mississippi and Georgia where they are found in pools in rivers which have a good flow and in impoundments. They have been introduced elsewhere in the United States; the hybridization of this species with the redeye bass after Alabama bass were introduced into Keowee Reservoir in South Carolina is thought to have been the cause in the decline in the population of redeye bass. Micropterus henshalli was first formally described as a subspecies of the spotted bass (M. punctulatus) by Carl Leavitt Hubbs and Reeve Maclaren Bailey in 1940 with the type locality given as Jefferson County, Alabama. The specific name honors James A. Henshall who was a bass angler.
