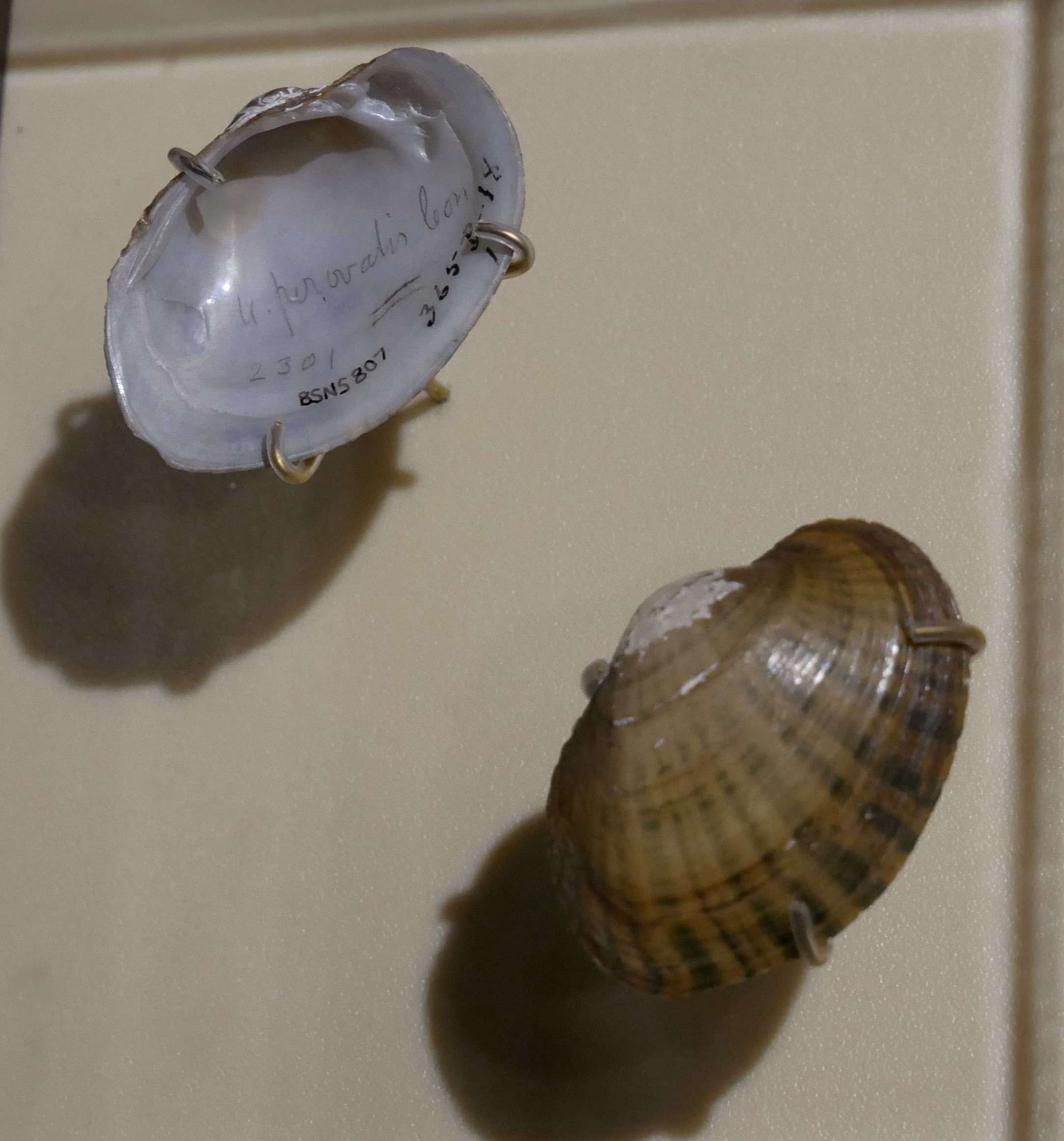
- Museum specimen

Conservation status
- Near Threatened (IUCN 2.3)

- Critically Imperiled (NatureServe)

Scientific classification
- Kingdom: Animalia
- Phylum: Mollusca
- Class: Bivalvia
- Order: Unionida
- Family: Unionidae
- Genus: Hamiota
- Species: H. perovalis

Binomial name
- Hamiota perovalis (Conrad, 1834)
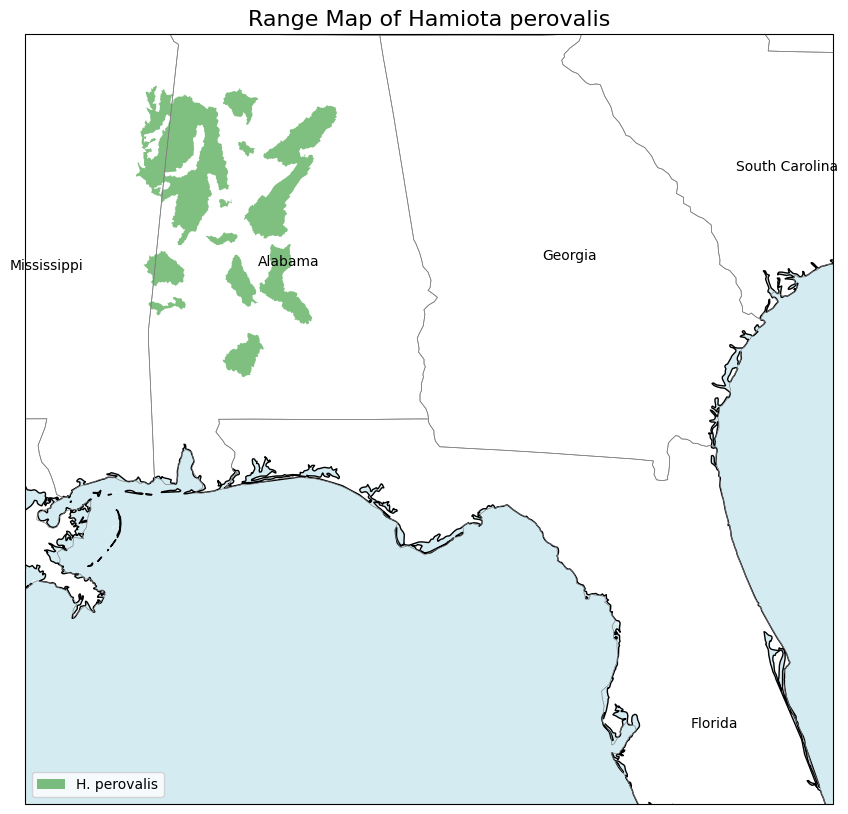

Synonyms
- Unio perovalis Conrad, 1834; Unio placitus Lea, 1852; Unio spillmanii Lea, 1861; Lampsilis perovalis (Conrad, 1834); Lampsilis (Lampsilis) perovalis (Conrad, 1834); Lampsilis spillmanii (Lea, 1861); Margarita (Unio) perovalis (Conrad, 1834); Margaron (Unio) perovalis (Conrad, 1834); Margaron (Unio) placitus (Lea, 1853)

= Hamiota perovalis =

Species of bivalve

Hamiota perovalis, the orangenacre mucket or orange-nacre mucket, is a species of freshwater mussel, an aquatic bivalve mollusk in the family Unionidae, the river mussels.

This species is endemic to Alabama and Mississippi in the United States. It is listed as Threatened under the Endangered Species Act.

== Taxonomy ==
It was first described in 1834 by Timothy Abbott Conrad as Unio perovalis. It was placed in the Lampsilis genus through the 20th century and in 2005, Roe and Hartfield placed it in a new genus Hamiota. Placement in the genus was based on characteristics such as a superconglutinate lure, placement and shape of the marsupia (gills), and release of larvae through the excurrent siphon. Lampsilis spillmanii is also now considered the same as Hamiota perovalis.

== Geography ==
The orangenacre mucket historically occurred in the Alabama River and tributaries of the Tombigbee, Black Warrior, and Little Cahaba rivers. According to U.S. Fish and Wildlife Service, as of 2014 it existed in several tributaries of the Tombigbee, including the Buttahatchee, East Fork Tombigbee, Sipsey, and Little Cahaba. It has not been reported from the Alabama River since the 19th century.

The most robust population is in the Sipsey Fork, though it was affected by drought in 2000.

== Description ==
This mussel is 5 to 9 centimeters (2 to 3.6 inches) long and oval in shape. It is yellow to reddish brown in color, sometimes with green rays. The nacre can be orange, rose, pink, or white. In females, the posterior margin of the shell is sloped and shortened.

== Habitat ==
It lives in large to small streams and rivers, in margins or flowing pools with stable sand or gravel bottoms.

== Life cycle ==
It is mainly sedentary, and likely feeds on zooplankton and organic detritus by siphoning the water like other species of Unionidae. The sexes are separate, and the male releases sperm into the water, which is taken in by the female's siphon.

Between March and June, the female releases a mucous-encased package of larvae resembling a small minnow, complete with a black stripe and eye spot, which she uses to lure host fish for her parasitic larva (glochidia). The package, called a superconglutinate, is attached to the female or to a substrate by a long mucous tether, so that it darts in the water like a fish.

When a fish bites at the lure, it ruptures, sending a cloud of larvae at the fish, many of which attach to the fish's gills to feed off it as they develop. The glochidia feed off the host fish for 20-50 days, before dropping off as juvenile mussels and burying themselves into the stream bottom.

The orangenacre mucket is a host specialist, meaning it requires a specific kind of fish. Primary host fish are three species of Micropterus: spotted bass, redeye bass, and largemouth bass, and possibly the chain pickerel. The large size of its superconglutinate is adapted to the prey size of these bass.

Hamiota species can also use a mantle lure, flapping part of their body to attract fish.

== Threats and conservation ==
The orangenacre mucket was listed as Threatened under the Endangered Species Act in 1993, and critical habitat was established in 2004. It is listed as Near Threatened on the IUCN Red List (updated in 1996), and G1 Critically Imperiled by NatureServe.

Major threats to the species are dams and other alteration of river systems, sedimentation, debris removal, and water pollution. More than 1,700 km (1,100 mi) of the Mobile River basin are impounded by small and large dams, a 700 km increase since 1993. Sedimentation and reduced water flow due to dams cause suffocation, decreased oxygen levels and food supply in the river, and change the habitat. Changes affect host fish which mussels rely on to reproduce. Dam construction also isolates populations, making it impossible for populations to form in new areas due to the physical barrier.

Other causes of sediment in the water that affect this species are gravel mining, abandoned kaolin mines, channel alteration, agriculture, forestry, and industrial and residential development. The orangenacre mucket has disappeared from the lower part of the Buttahatchee River due to impoundments and diversion of the river for gravel mines.

Freshwater mussels are highly sensitive to pollutants such as chlorine, ammonia, heavy metals, and high levels of nitrogen and phosphorus. These pollutants enter the stream through agricultural run-off and municipal and industrial wastewater.

The Alabama Aquatic Biodiversity Center reintroduced the species to several locations beginning in 2012, at least one of which has been successful so far.

Recent projects in Alabama such as a fish passage in the Clairborne dam and a 2024 purchase of wetland by the Nature Conservancy show growing concern for protection of the Mobile basin's river habitats.
