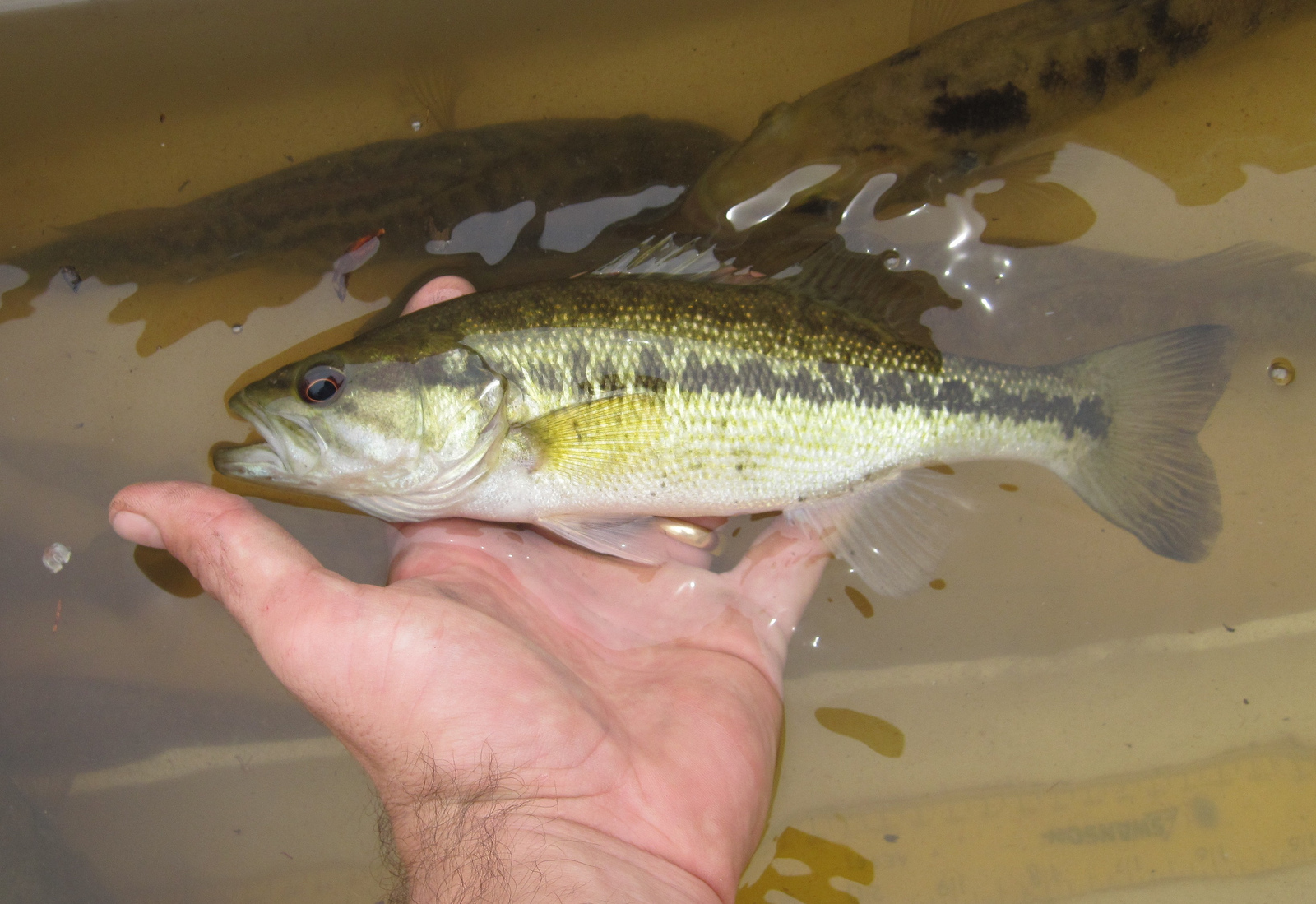

Scientific classification
- Kingdom: Animalia
- Phylum: Chordata
- Class: Actinopterygii
- Order: Centrarchiformes
- Family: Centrarchidae
- Genus: Micropterus
- Species: M. sp. cf. punctulatus

Binomial name
- Micropterus sp. cf. punctulatus

= Choctaw bass =

Species of fish

The Choctaw bass (Micropterus sp. cf. punctulatus) is a provisional new species of black bass found in the upper panhandle of Florida.

== Naming ==
Scientists from Florida Wildlife Conservation have decided to name the provisional species the Choctaw bass and want to use a Latinized version of the root word 'haiaka' in the scientific name. The name Choctaw comes from the Native American tribe which used to occupy the area in which the new species of bass was found. The scientific designation is derived from the Choctaw language; haiaka means 'revealed' or 'out-of-hiding' in the Choctaw language.

== Description ==
The Choctaw bass can be hard to distinguish from other black bass in the same genus. Only by looking at a combination of features is it possible to tell the difference. The best visual method for identifying the bass is by counting the number of scales the fish has in certain areas. Their fin ray counts also differ from some of the other basses, and the Choctaw bass has different numbers of gill rakers (protrusions along an arch inside the gill) when compared to some of the other basses. Otherwise, the Choctaw bass shares many morphological features with other basses. This similarity in appearance is one of the reasons why the Choctaw bass has gone unnoticed for so long. For an accurate identification, DNA testing must be done.

== Region ==
FWC's research shows that the Choctaw bass can range from the eastern Gulf coastal rivers that initiate in the western Florida panhandle and extend into southeastern Alabama. It is known to occur in the Yellow River, Blackwater River, Choctawhatchee River, Escambia River and the Perdido River. The Choctaw bass that were captured by the scientists were normally caught in the stagnant parts of river systems or streams where the sediment gathers, the bass avoid fast moving water from stream and rivers and are normally found close to the coastline.

== Discovery ==
Because the Choctaw bass had such similarities between other black basses, it went unnoticed for many years. During genetic testing of new specimens from northwest Florida's Chipola River in 2007, Mike Tringali and other FWC scientists encountered a DNA profile that did not belong to any native black bass species. These scientists then tested tissue samples collected from nearby river systems and found the source of the unique DNA profile - in Choctaw bass. Finally, the FWC scientists compared the genetic composition of the Choctaw bass against all other known species of black bass and came to the conclusion that they in fact had a new species. Mike Tringali, who heads the genetic laboratory at the FWC Fish and Wildlife Research Institute, has said he and his team of researchers "were originally looking for evidence of hybridization between the shoal bass and spotted bass, which also inhabit certain Florida Panhandle and Alabama River basins.” There is considerable controversy over what constitutes a new species. After presenting the new species to the American Fisheries Society and submitting a formal species description for publication, Mike Tringali and his team must wait for final approval, which he said could take up to a year, although he doesn't see any dams ahead that would slow the flow of that process.

== Conservation ==
Since the scientists have found the new species of bass, their goal is to make sure that the population and habitat stays healthy by starting conservation practices early instead of later. FWC has found that the biggest danger to the Choctaw bass comes from the spotted bass and the Alabama bass, which are closely related to it. So far everywhere scientists have found Choctaw bass there has been an absence of the Alabama bass and the spotted bass, this is good news because the different bass species are often introduced outside of their native range to try and popularize sport fishing, which can offset the native bass. If spotted bass and Alabama bass were to be introduced into the habitat of the Choctaw bass, these species can overtake the Choctaw bass through interbreeding thus lowering the number of purebred Choctaw bass.
