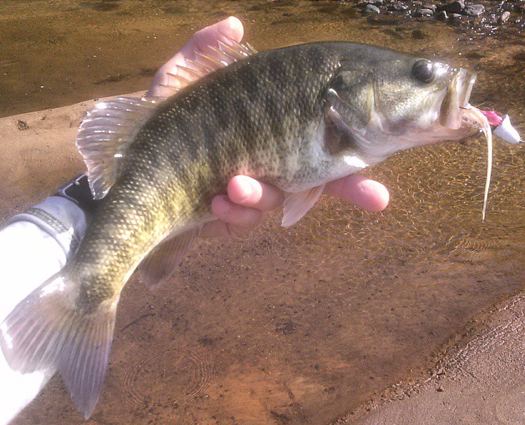
- Shoal bass caught on the Flint River, Georgia

Conservation status
- Near Threatened (IUCN 3.1)

Scientific classification
- Kingdom: Animalia
- Phylum: Chordata
- Class: Actinopterygii
- Order: Centrarchiformes
- Family: Centrarchidae
- Genus: Micropterus
- Species: M. cataractae

Binomial name
- Micropterus cataractae Williams & Burgess, 1999

= Shoal bass =

Species of fish

The shoal bass (Micropterus cataractae) is a species of freshwater fish in the sunfish family (Centrarchidae) of order Centrarchiformes. One of the black basses, it is native to waters in Florida and Georgia. It is also occasionally found in rivers and streams of East Alabama where it has been declared an endangered species and cannot legally be kept if caught by fishermen. Of typical size for a black bass, M. cataractae reaches a maximum recorded length of 24 inches (61 cm) and a maximum published weight of 8 pounds, 12 ounces.

Only described for the first time in 1999, ichthyologists are still expanding what is known about the species. The shoal bass is often confused with the redeye bass, due to its red-tinted eyes. It is also often confused with the smallmouth bass, due to its faint vertical stripes along the side of its body.

== Description ==
This species was formerly considered either a redeye bass or subspecies of the redeye bass. In 1999 it was described as a new species.

The red color of eyes associates this species with the redeye and Suwannee bass at first glance. However, it is more closely related morphologically to the spotted bass. Shoal bass are generally olive green to nearly black along the back. A dusky dark blotch about 50 to 67 percent of the size of the eye occurs on the back edge of the gill cover. Three diagonal black lines radiate along the side of the head looking like war paint. Ten to fifteen vertical blotches appear along the sides with tiger-stripes often appearing in between.

The belly is creamy or white and wavy lines may appear slightly above the white belly on the sides. The dorsal, caudal and anal fins are dark olive green to grayish black. Pelvic fins may have a cream colored leading edge with dark spots.

The shoal bass has scales on the base portion of the soft-rayed dorsal fins, clearly connected first and second dorsal fins, and an upper jaw bone that does not extend beyond the eyes.

There are no known subspecies of the shoal bass.

== Range and habitat ==
The shoal bass is becoming increasingly uncommon in the Apalachicola and Chipola rivers because so few shoals exist and competition with non-native spotted bass has increased. It is also known in the Chattahoochee River drainage; and is most plentiful in the relatively undammed Flint River of Georgia, as well as lakes such as Blackshear and West Point. Shoal bass are closely associated with rock shoals and are uncommon in other habitat due to their unique spawning requirements.

The conservation status of shoal bass is vulnerable throughout its range. Good fishing still exists in Georgia's Flint River, but anglers are encouraged to catch and release. Conversely, anglers are urged to keep all spotted bass caught on the Flint River because of its competition with and potential for hybridizing with the shoal bass.

== Behavior ==
Shoal bass spawn in coarse gravel at the heads of creek pools in April and May, to early June. They prefer a spawning temperature of 64 to 79 °F (18 to 26 °C). Like the largemouth, the male prepares the nest and guards the eggs and fry.

Shoal bass feed mainly on aquatic insects on the surface. They also feed on larval insects, crayfish and fish. Shoal bass grow much faster than redeye bass.

== Sporting quality ==
Shoal bass caught on ultralight tackle

Shoal bass offer similar sporting quality to that of other species of black bass. They can be caught using worms, minnows, or crayfish as well as small spinners and a wide variety of small surface lures. Some have been known to reach more than eight pounds. As a sport fish, specific bag and size limit regulations apply, and you can register a qualifying catch as part of the Florida Fish and Wildlife Conservation Commission's "Big Catch" program.

The shoal bass has white, flaky meat, which tends to be drier than that of a largemouth or spotted bass.

The world record shoal bass was 8 pounds, 12 ounces according to the International Game Fish Association. The fish was caught October 23, 1977, in the Apalachicola River, Florida. This bass was a shoal bass, but originally reported as the Apalachicola form of redeye bass.

Shoal bass are also popular targets for fly fishers, who find them easy to access in their preferred river environments. The practice of fly fishing for shoal bass is becoming more widespread.

The shoal bass fights harder than its cousin, the largemouth bass, and has more stamina. They prefer moderate to heavy current and will take crawdad patterns aggressively. Five pound shoal bass are considered trophies, but fish above seven pounds are caught each year.
