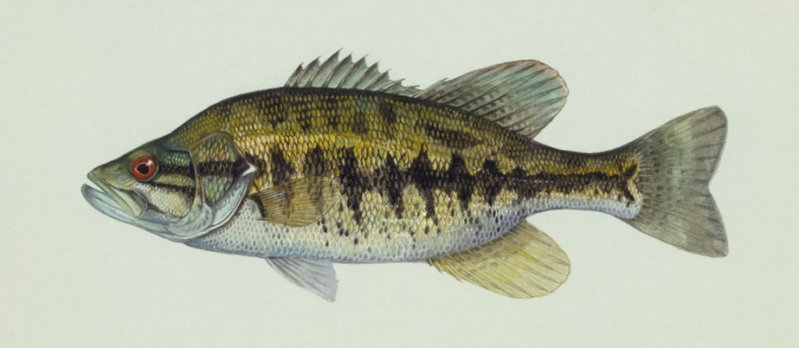

Conservation status
- Near Threatened (IUCN 3.1)

Scientific classification
- Kingdom: Animalia
- Phylum: Chordata
- Class: Actinopterygii
- Order: Centrarchiformes
- Family: Centrarchidae
- Genus: Micropterus
- Species: M. notius

Binomial name
- Micropterus notius R. M. Bailey & C. L. Hubbs, 1949

= Suwannee bass =

Species of fish

The Suwannee bass (Micropterus notius) is a species of freshwater fish in the sunfish family (Centrarchidae) of order Centrarchiformes. One of the black basses, This species is native to just two river systems in Florida and Georgia, although it has been introduced elsewhere.

== Description ==
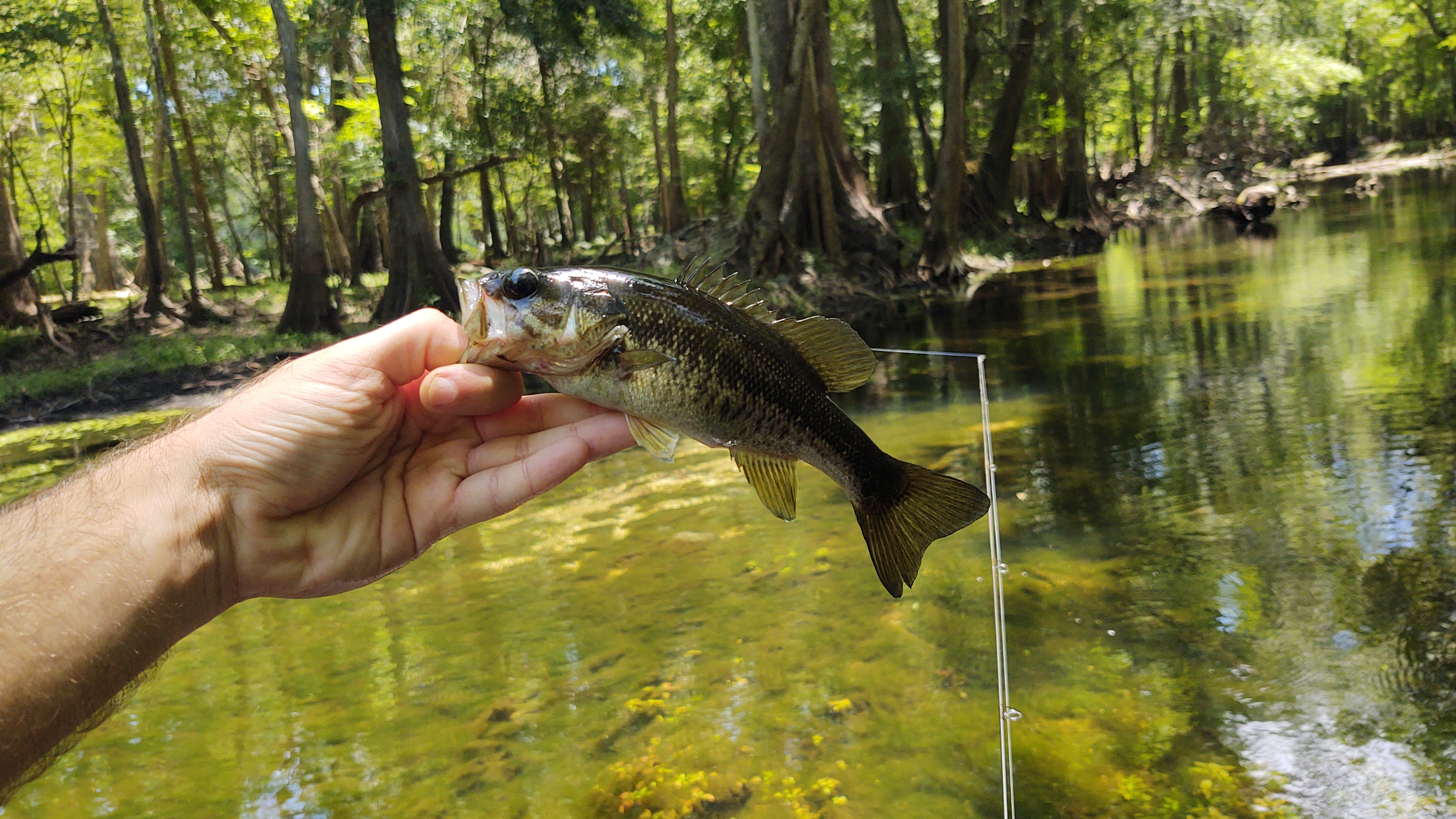
A Suwannee bass caught out of the Santa Fe River near High Springs, Florida (May 27, 2023).

The Suwannee bass is a rather small species compared to its congeners and has a deep body with a large mouth in which the maxilla is placed beneath the eye and there is a circular patch of teeth on the tongue. The base of the soft part of the dorsal fin and the anal fin are scaled. They are mostly brown in color marked with a dozen olive blotches on the flanks. These blotches are wider than the gaps between them towards the head but they merge towards the tail eventually creating a horizontal band near the caudal peduncle. There is a large blotch at the base of the caudal fin which has a pale margin, this is more obvious in young fish which also show bold mottling on the soft part of the dorsal fin, the anal fin and the caudal fin. In the breeding season, the adults show a turquoise coloration on the cheek, breast and belly. This species attains a maximum total length of 40 centimeters (16 in) although a more usual total length would be around 21 centimeters (8.3 in) and the maximum published weight is 1.8 kilograms (4.0 lb).

== Distribution ==
The Suwannee bass is endemic to the southeastern United States where it is native to the lower Suwannee and Ochlockonee River systems in Florida and a small part of Georgia. It has been introduced into the St. Marks River and the Wacissa River in Florida.

== Habitat and biology ==
The Suwannee bass is found in fast-moving shallow areas of rivers, known as shoals, over limestone, this is frequently covered in sand. They usually prefer neutral or basic waters, originating in springs emerging from aquifers in the limestone. They are uncommon in the lower parts of the Suwannee River where there is a tidal influence, but are absent from the upper reaches which are dominated by acidic waters draining from the Okefenokee Swamp. This species has a diet which is dominated by crayfish, although they will eat other invertebrates and fishes. In the lower, tidal reaches of the Suwannee River, the blue crab is taken by this species. The spawning season runs from February to May, peaking in April and May, when the water temperature reaches 18–19 °C (64–66 °F) The eggs are laid in circular depressions excavated near the edges of the streams where they are fertilized by the male. The male then guards the eggs up to the point of hatching. Females have a faster growth rate and attain larger sizes than the males; the males rarely attain lengths greater than 13 inches (33 cm). The females can have a life span of up to 12 years, while the males live up to nine years.

== Taxonomy ==
The Suwannee bass was first formally described by Reeve Maclaren Bailey and Carl Leavitt Hubbs in 1949 with the type locality given as Head of Ichetucknee Springs at Lead, Columbia County, Florida.

== Relationship with humans ==
While not as well known as other black basses, M. notius is also fished for sport. The IGFA all-tackle world record for the species stands at 1.75 kg (3 lb 14 oz) caught from the Suwannee River in 1985, and the length record is 17 inches (43 cm) from the Withlacoochee River in 2025.
