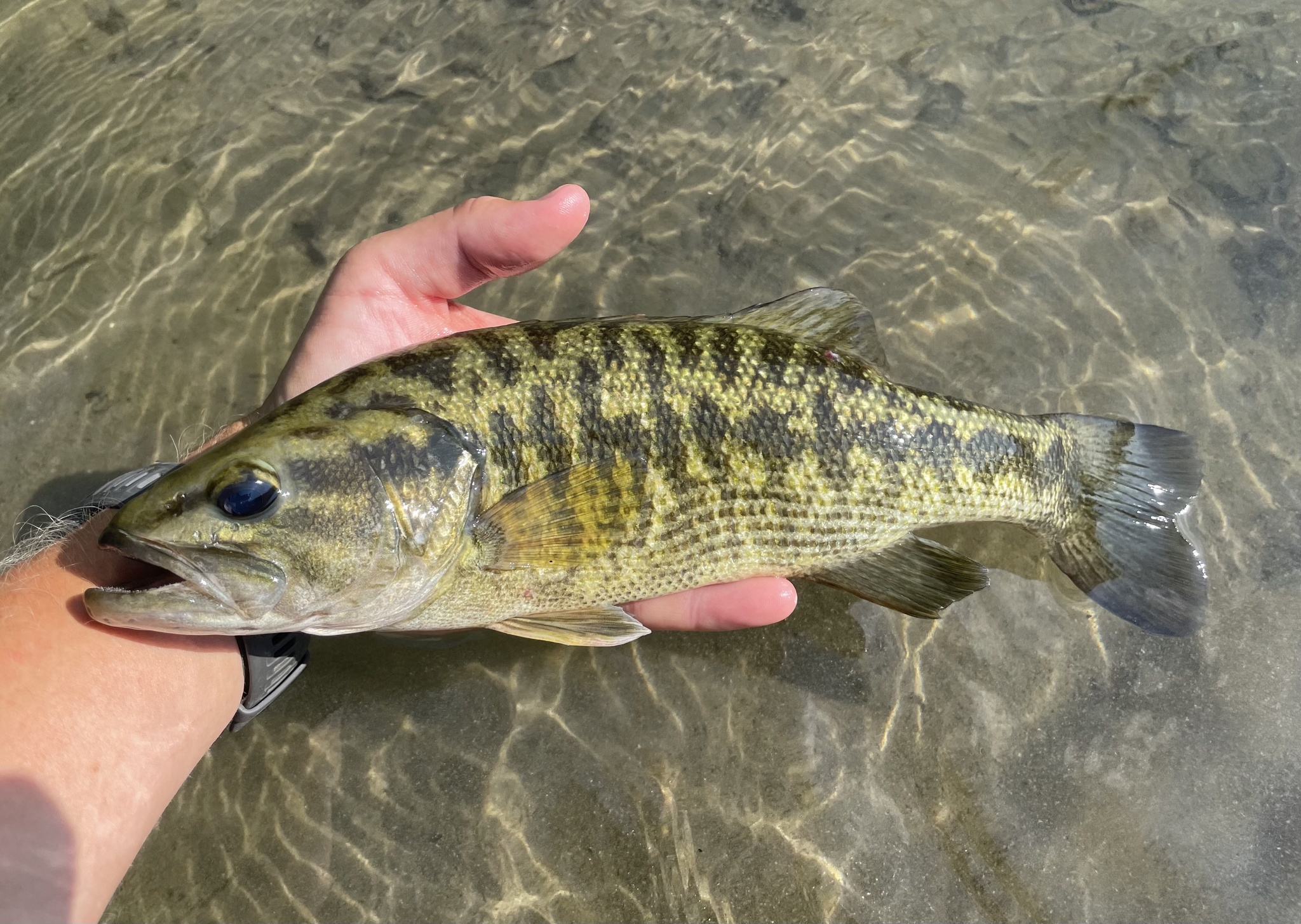

Conservation status
- Near Threatened (IUCN 3.1)

- Vulnerable (NatureServe)

Scientific classification
- Kingdom: Animalia
- Phylum: Chordata
- Class: Actinopterygii
- Order: Centrarchiformes
- Family: Centrarchidae
- Genus: Micropterus
- Species: M. treculii

Binomial name
- Micropterus treculii (Vaillant & Bocourt, 1874)

= Guadalupe bass =

Species of fish

The Guadalupe bass (Micropterus treculii) is a rare species of fish endemic to the U.S. state of Texas, where it also is the official state fish. It is restricted to creeks and rivers (including the Guadalupe River, hence the name Guadalupe bass), and is listed as near threatened. Today, most fly fishermen and anglers practice catch-and-release techniques to improve fish populations. The Guadalupe bass is often difficult to distinguish from the smallmouth bass or spotted bass, and the fish is known to hybridize.

== Distribution ==
The fish is only found in the Edwards Plateau in central Texas. Its main habitats are the San Marcos, Colorado, Llano, and Guadalupe Rivers, but can also be found in smaller streams such as Barton Creek, Onion Creek, San Gabriel River and the Comal River. The species has also been farm-raised and stocked in the Llano River.

== Description ==
Guadalupe bass, like most black bass, are lime to olive green in color, this particular species being lighter in shade usually in river specimens. They have a lateral line covered in mostly separate diamond-shaped or circular spots, which with age fade from black to olive. Also, many smaller diamond marks are scattered on the back, which are less distinguished than the ones on the lateral line. They have a rectangular tooth patch on the tongue. Its physical traits are very similar to the spotted bass (i.e. small mouth that does not extend past the eye, sleek figure, etc.) with one exception; the green coloring tends to extend lower on the body past the lateral line than their relatives. So far, the record catch is 3.71 lb (3 lb 11.4 oz), caught by Dr. Bryan Townsend of Austin in 2014.

== Threats and predators ==
The Guadalupe bass has almost no predators. Its main threat is not predation, but hybridization with the introduced smallmouth bass. The two species are very closely related and in some rivers almost half the Guadalupe bass are hybrids. The Texas Parks and Wildlife Dept stated it will likely stock many bass in the future to beat out the hybrid population. This will be a pilot for several other areas where rare spotted bass subspecies are having the same problems.

== Habitat ==
Typically, Guadalupe bass are found in streams and reservoirs; they are absent from extreme headwaters. They prefer flowing waters of streams within native variety, and use covers such as large rocks, cypress trees, or stumps for refuge. Juvenile fish are often found in fast-moving water but begin transitioning to deeper, moderate current towards the end of their first year.

== Diet ==
The fish (especially juveniles and very old fish), unlike other bass, have an inclination towards insects. Guadalupe bass at their predatory peak prefer larger bait fish such as shad and small bass or bluegills.

== Fishing ==
While almost unheard of elsewhere, the Guadalupe bass is very popular among fishermen in Central Texas. It is prized for its long, tough fights, in which it manipulates the current and its unusually strong muscles, and beautiful colors which tend to be more natural and bright than those of spotted bass. Its preference for strong current and its large diet of insects earned it the name "Texas brook trout" and make it popular for fly fishermen. It fights similarly to both smallmouth bass and rainbow trout—making long runs and manipulating current, but also making sharp turns and attempting to entangle the line on structures, and even making large jumps like both species.

The IGFA all-tackle world record for the species stands at 1.67 kg (3 lb 11 oz) caught in Lake Travis in Texas in 1983.

== Reproduction ==
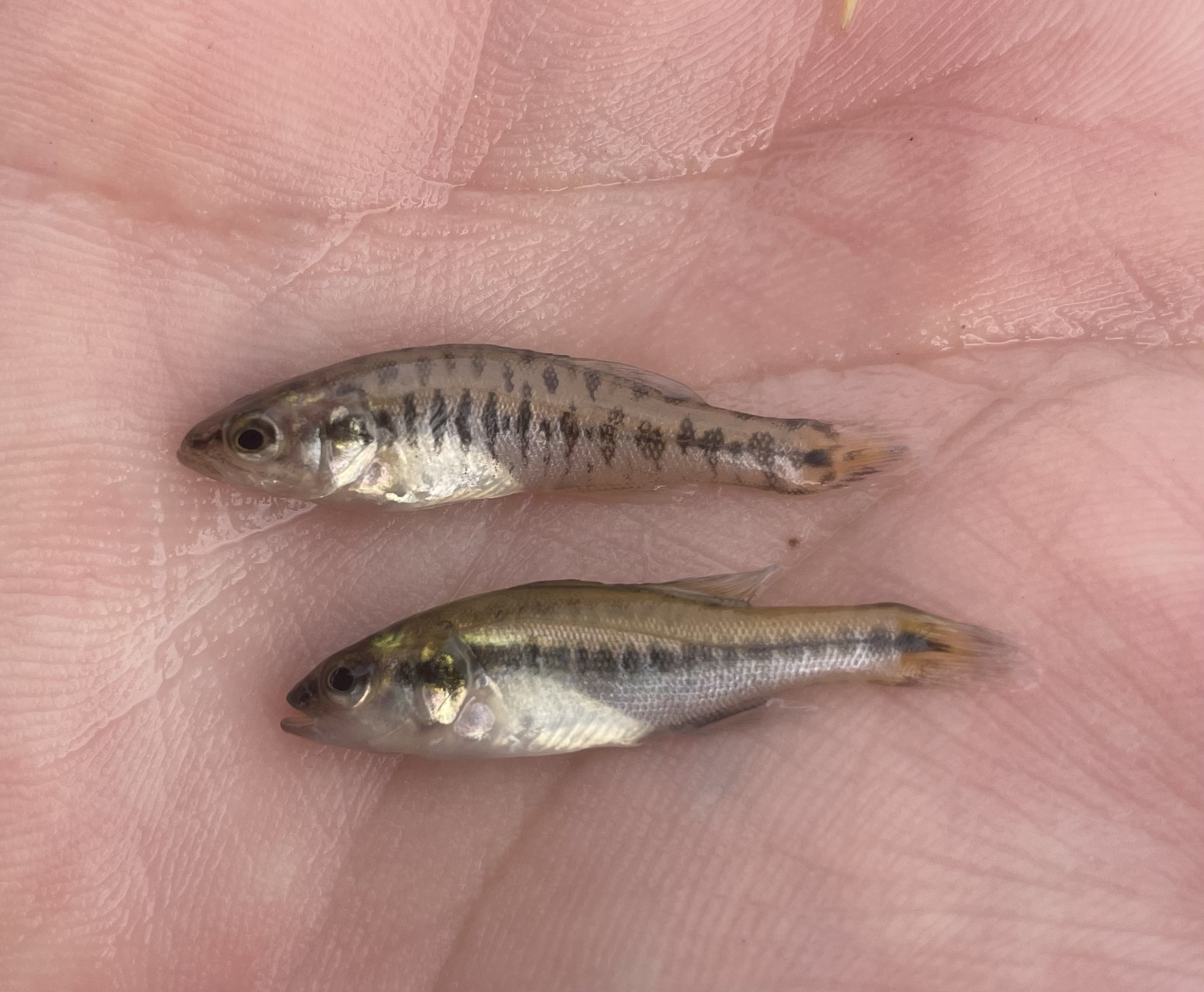
Juvenile (top) compared to juvenile largemouth bass (bottom), in Texas

Both male and female Guadalupe Bass reach adulthood and sexually maturity at one year of age. Their spawning begins as early as March and continues into June depending on the locale and water conditions. However, unlike many other bass, a secondary spawn is possible in late summer or early fall. The male Guadalupe Bass builds and picks out a gravel nest for spawning in shallow water where there is a high flow rate but out of the way of fast moving water. It is important the male finds a good-looking nest, for these gravel nests attract the females. The female lays between 400 and 9000 eggs, but is chased away by the male immediately after she lays the eggs. From this point on, the male guards the nest from predators and will not eat, but may strike a lure in order to defend its territory. The male Guadalupe stays guard over the fry as they hatch. After hatching, the fry feed on invertebrates.
