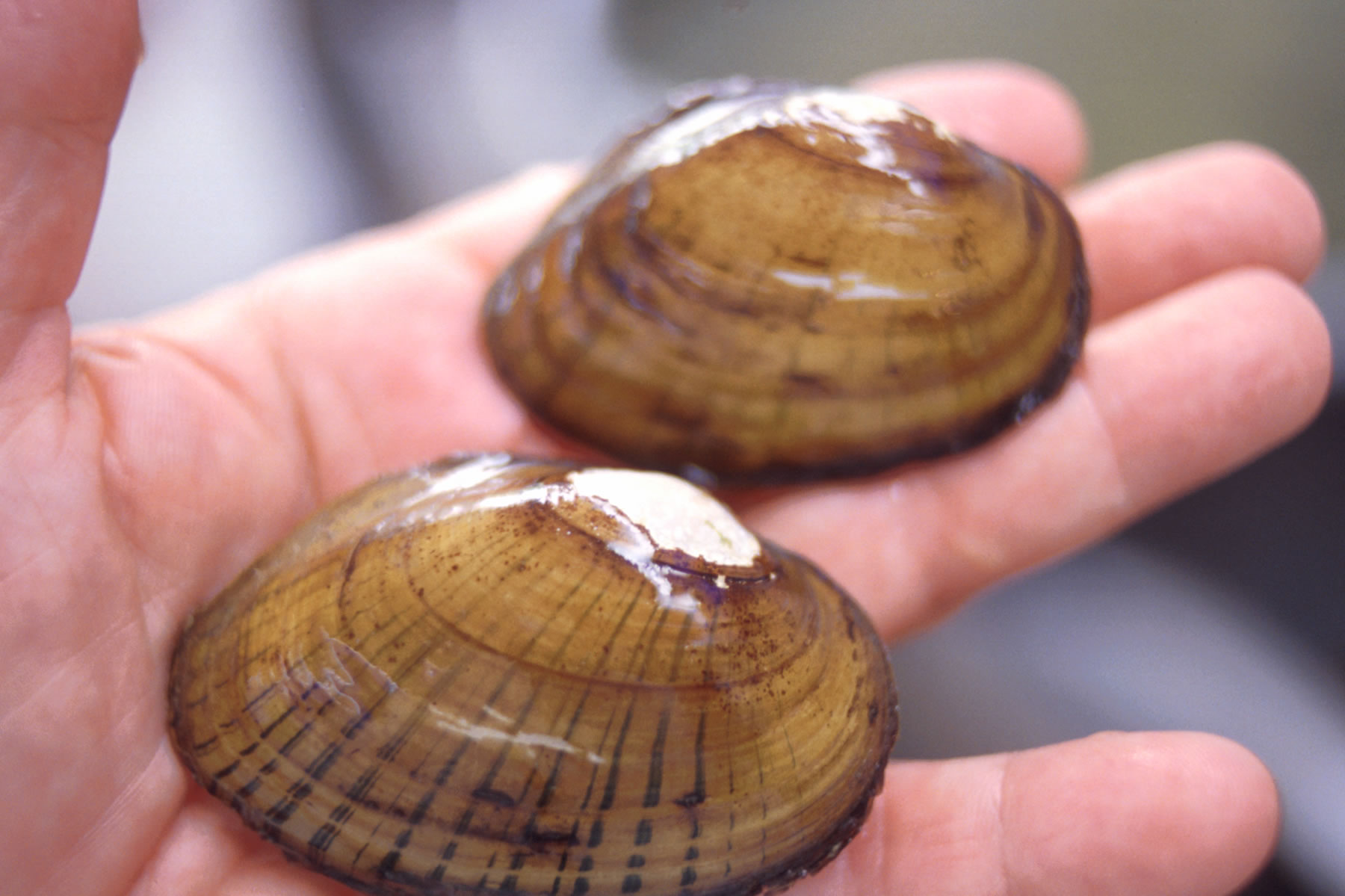
- Hamiota altilis

Scientific classification
- Kingdom: Animalia
- Phylum: Mollusca
- Class: Bivalvia
- Order: Unionida
- Family: Unionidae
- Tribe: Lampsilini
- Genus: Hamiota; Roe & Hartfield, 2005

= Hamiota (bivalve) =

Genus of bivalves

Hamiota is a genus of freshwater mussels, aquatic bivalve mollusks in the family Unionidae, the river mussels.

== Taxonomy ==
The genus was created in 2005 by Roe and Hartfield. It consists of four species that had previously been placed in the genus Lampsilis.

The genus name means "angler", derived from the Greek hamus, meaning "hook". The name refers to the lure by which the species attracts a host fish for their parasitic larvae.

== Geography ==
Species are found in the Gulf of Mexico river drainage in the southeastern United States, including the Mobile, Apalachicola, Ochlockonee, and Choctawhatchee rivers and their tributaries in Alabama, Georgia, Florida, Mississippi, and Tennessee.

== Description ==
Members of Hamiota are small- to medium-sized freshwater bivalves with an oval or elliptical shape, around 45-100mm in length. The shell shape is sexually dimorphic, with males being more acutely pointed on the posterior end. The marsupia (gills) are often asymmetrical. They release their lure and larvae through the excurrent siphon, instead of through pores in the ventral edge of the demibranches like members of Lampsilis.

A unique feature of Hamiota is the superconglutinate lure, a discrete mass containing the larvae and resembling a small fish in shape and coloration, which remains tethered to the female by a long, transparent, mucous strand. The lure displays a darting motion in the water that mimics a small fish. When captured by a host fish, the larvae disperse and become attached to the host fish's gills. The strand may become detached from the female and be found snagged on debris, where it continues to show darting motion that may attract host fish. This tethered lure is one of the most elaborate strategies used by any freshwater mussel species to disperse their larvae.

== Conservation ==
All four species of Hamiota are listed under the Endangered Species Act as Endangered or Threatened. Some species have been extirpated from much of their historical range. Threats include alteration of river systems, sedimentation, and degradation of water quality.

== Species within the genus Hamiota ==
- Hamiota altilis (Finelined pocketbook)
- Hamiota australis (Southern sandshell)
- Hamiota perovalis (Orangenacre mucket)
- Hamiota subangulata (Shinyrayed pocketbook)
