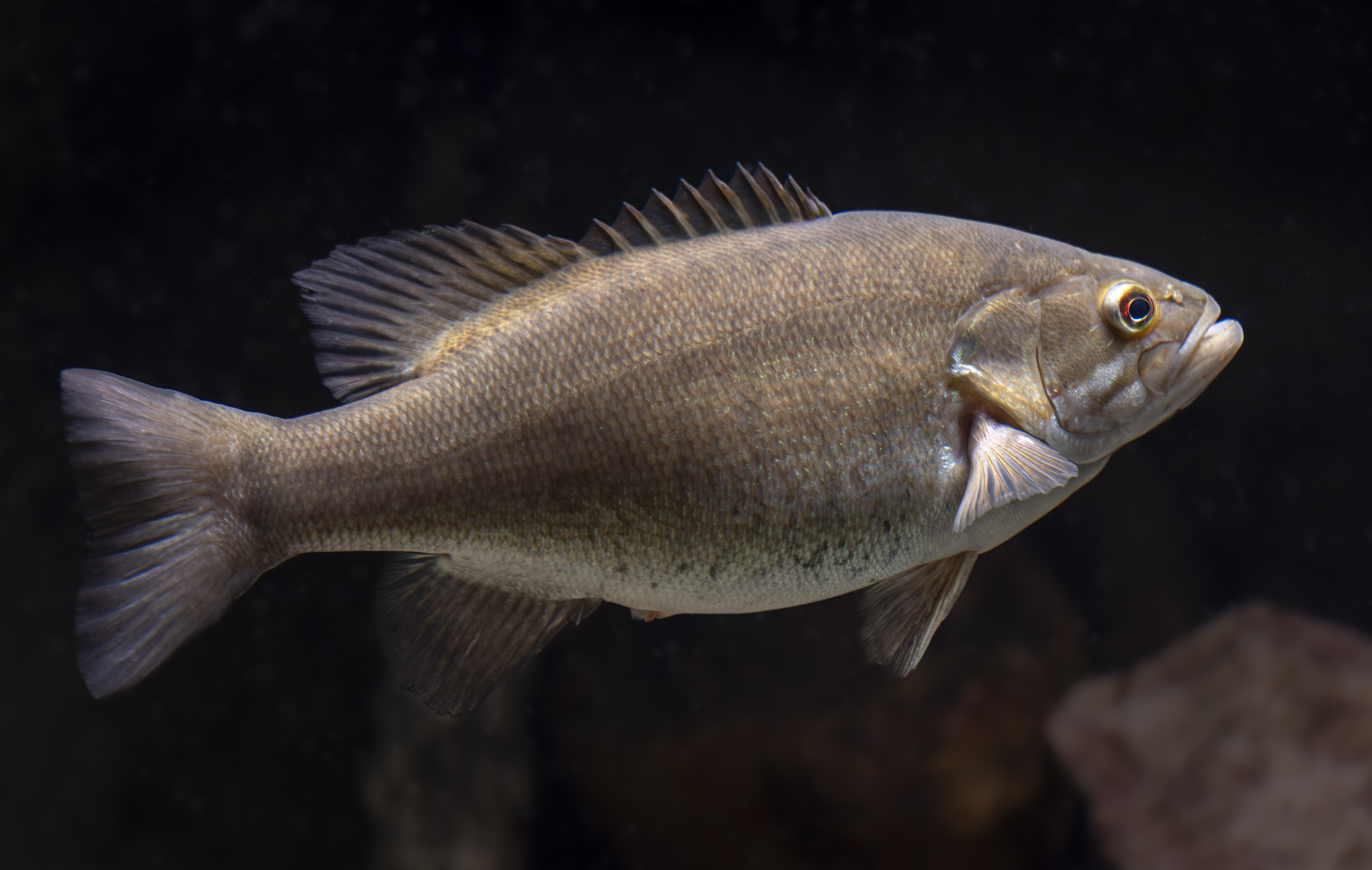
- Smallmouth bass (Micropterus dolomieu)

Scientific classification
- Kingdom: Animalia
- Phylum: Chordata
- Class: Actinopterygii
- Division: Teleostei
- Order: Centrarchiformes
- Family: Centrarchidae
- Subfamily: Lepominae
- Genus: Micropterus; Lacépède, 1802

Type species
- Micropterus dolomieu Lacépède, 1802

Synonyms
- List: Aplesion Rafinesque, 1820; Aplites Rafinesque, 1820; Calliurus Rafinesque, 1819; Dioplites Rafinesque, 1820; Gristes Cuvier, 1829; Huro Cuvier, 1828; Nemocampsis Rafinesque,.] 1820

= Micropterus =

Micropterus Temporal range: Middle Miocene to present

Genus of fishes

Micropterus is a genus of North American freshwater fish collectively known as the black bass, which belong to the sunfish family Centrarchidae of order Centrarchiformes. They are sometimes erroneously called "black trout", but the name trout more correctly refers to certain potamodromous members of the family Salmonidae (order Salmoniformes).

Micropterus are widely distributed east of the Rocky Mountains, from the Hudson Bay basin in Canada to northeastern Mexico. Several species, notably the largemouth and smallmouth bass, have been very widely introduced throughout the world, and are now considered cosmopolitan. All black bass species are highly sought-after game fish and well known as strong fighters when hooked, and bass fishing is an extremely popular outdoor sport throughout their native range. Their meat is quite edible and firm, although they are not regarded as commercial food fish.

All black bass species have a dull-green base coloring with dark patterns on the sides. Most reach a maximum overall length of 40–60 cm (16–24 in), but some strains of the largemouth bass have been reported to grow to almost 1 metre (3 ft 3 in) in length. In spawning seasons, the male builds a "nest" (spawning ground) in the bed where a female is induced to deposit her eggs, then the male externally fertilizes them. The male continues to guard the eggs and fry until they disperse from the nest.

Various black bass species have been introduced into freshwater bodies outside North America, where they become invasive in many instances. In Japan, they have been declared nuisance fish and are subjected to numerous attempts at eradicating them from local ecosystems.

== Fossil record ==
A single fossil species, †Micropterus relictus Smith, Cavender & Miller, 1975 is known from the Late Pliocene or Early Pleistocene of Jalisco, Mexico, when it presumably inhabited the Lake Chapala basin. This is the southernmost species known to have existed, as Micropterus basses are no longer native to the region. Several indeterminate fossil Micropterus are known from the Miocene of Nebraska and Oklahoma, US, with the oldest dating to the Middle Miocene (16–15 mya).

== Species ==
Currently, 14 recognized species are placed in this genus:

Image	Species	Common name	Distribution
	Micropterus cahabae W. H. Baker, Blanton & C. E. Johnston, 2013	Cahaba bass	
	Micropterus cataractae J. D. Williams & G. H. Burgess, 1999	shoal bass	
	Micropterus chattahoochae W. H. Baker, Blanton & C. E. Johnston, 2013	Chattahoochee bass	
	Micropterus coosae C. L. Hubbs & R. M. Bailey, 1940	redeye bass	
	Micropterus dolomieu Lacépède, 1802	smallmouth bass	
	Micropterus henshalli C. L. Hubbs & R. M. Bailey, 1940	Alabama bass	
	Micropterus notius R. M. Bailey & C. L. Hubbs, 1949	Suwannee bass	
	Micropterus punctulatus Rafinesque, 1819	spotted bass	
	Micropterus nigricans (Cuvier, 1828)	largemouth bass	
	Micropterus salmoides (Lacépède, 1802)	Florida bass	
	Micropterus tallapoosae W. H. Baker, Blanton & C. E. Johnston, 2013	Tallapoosa bass	
	Micropterus treculii (Vaillant & Bocourt, 1874)	Guadalupe bass	
	Micropterus velox Hubbs & Bailey, 1940	Neosho bass	
	Micropterus warriorensis W. H. Baker, Blanton & C. E. Johnston, 2013	warrior bass	

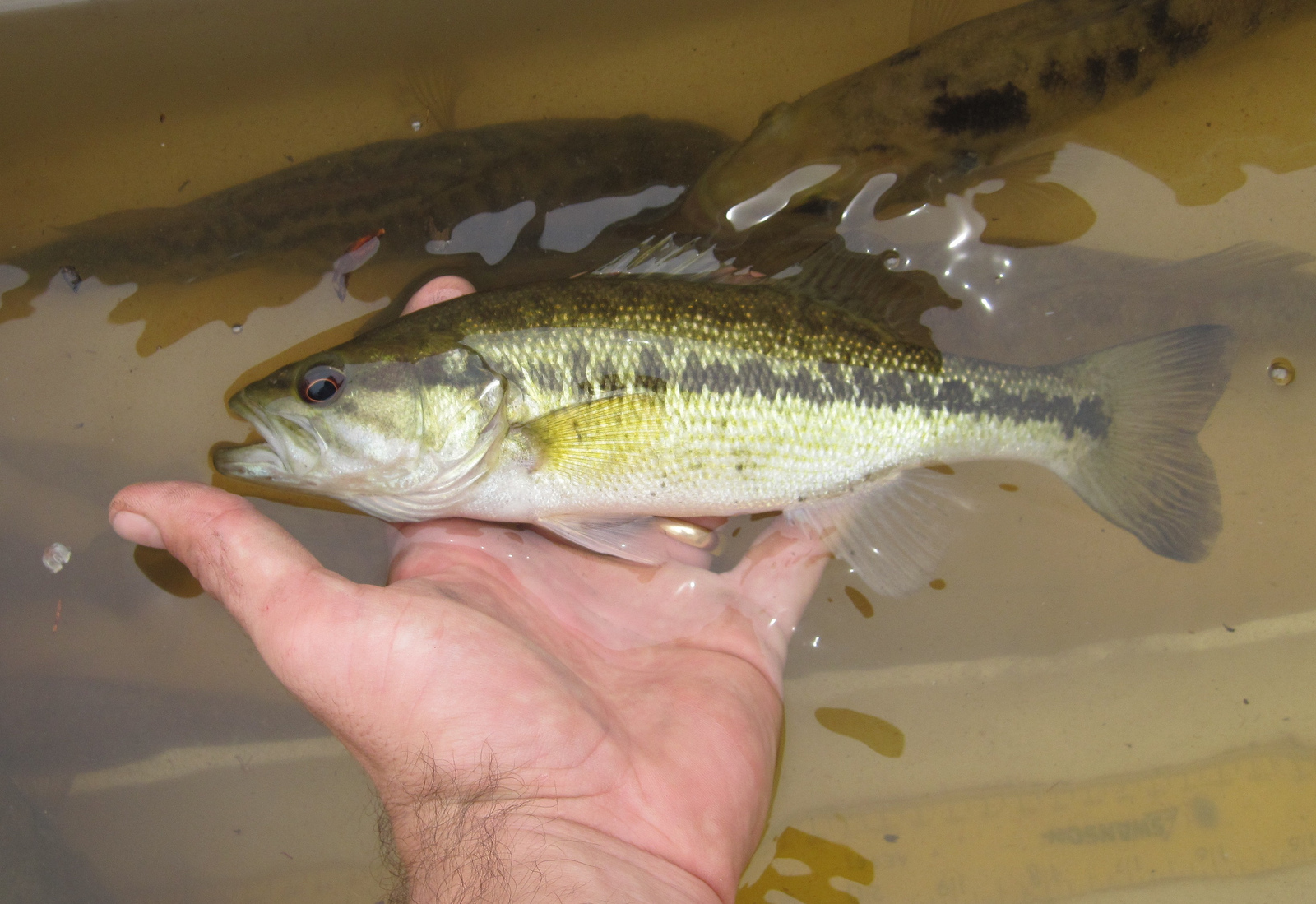
Choctaw bass ("M. haiaka")

A 15th species, the Choctaw bass Micropterus haiaka, has been proposed, but this does not yet appear to have been widely accepted. A further two species, the Altamaha bass and Bartram's bass, are as yet undescribed and have been included under the redeye bass.

A genomic analysis in 2022 described new species and found that the binomials, M. salmoides and M. floridanus as used above are misapplied to the largemouth bass and the Florida bass, this study found that M. salmoides is the valid binomial for the Florida bass, while M. floridanus, is its junior synonym. They also found that the oldest available binomial for the largemouth bass is M. nigricans.

== See also ==
- Bass fishing
