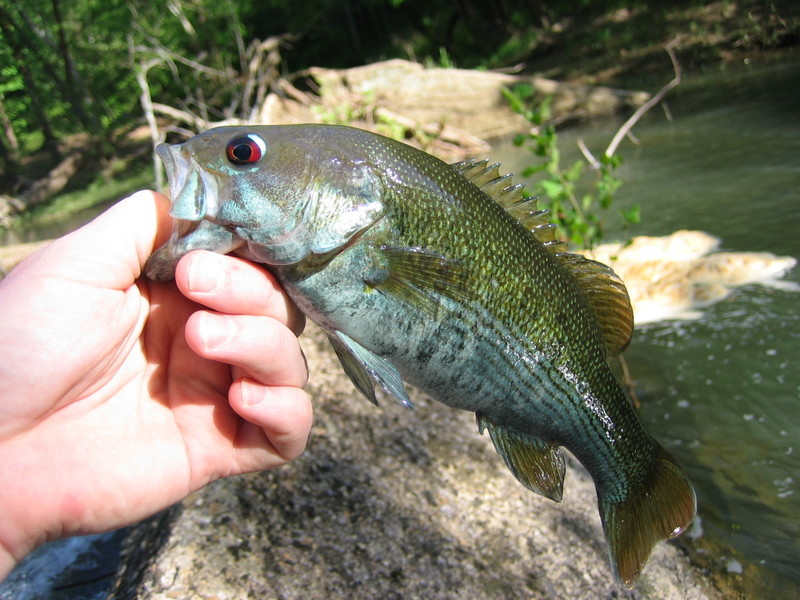
- Typical redeye bass from a stream in the Coosa River watershed, N. Georgia (Released)

Conservation status
- Least Concern (IUCN 3.1)

Scientific classification
- Kingdom: Animalia
- Phylum: Chordata
- Class: Actinopterygii
- Division: Teleostei
- Order: Centrarchiformes
- Family: Centrarchidae
- Genus: Micropterus
- Species: M. coosae

Binomial name
- Micropterus coosae Hubbs & Bailey, 1940
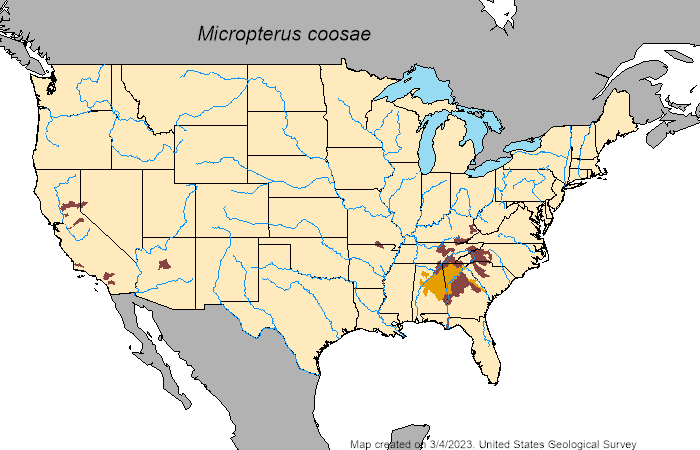
- Distribution map of the Redeye bass. Yellow represents native and purple represents where it has been introduced.

= Redeye bass =

Species of fish

The redeye bass, redeye, or Coosa bass (Micropterus coosae) is a species of freshwater fish in the sunfish family (Centrarchidae).The small bass is endemic to the Mobile and Alabama River systems, more specifically the Coosa River, which is a major tributary to the Alabama River in Georgia and Tennessee.

== Systematics ==
=== Taxonomy and classification ===
Redeye historically have been under-described compared to other centrarchids (sunfish). The osteology (skeleton) of M. coosae fits the general centrarchid (sunfish) pattern. These similarities in anatomy provide a gateway into understanding evolutionary relationships for future taxonomic and phylogenetic research. Etymologically, the redeye bass was named by American Ichthyologists Carl Hubbs and Reeve Bailey in 1940 upon discovery of the holotype (first official specimen). The species name “coosae” derives from the Coosa River system in Georgia, its native region. Prior to Hubbs's and Bailey's later research, M. coosae was taxonomically considered to be a small form of smallmouth bass. This misconception may be due to redeye bass's tendency to hybridize with smallmouth and spotted bass, as seen in California.

=== Similar and co-occurring species ===
Two native species of fish have the most prominent similarity to redeye bass in terms of diet and habitat – the rainbow trout (Oncorhynchus mykiss), and Sacramento pikeminnow (Ptychocheilus grandis). These fishes can co-occur with redeye bass in small numbers below refuge areas. Additionally, redeye bass are often confused with the recently (1999) described shoal bass (M. cataractae) from Alabama, Georgia, and Florida, which is sympatric (occupying the same geographic area) with redeye bass. Before the formal description of shoal bass by James Williams and George H. Burgess in 1999, shoal bass were often considered a type of redeye bass and were sometimes called the "Flint River form of Redeye Bass". In 2013, the redeye bass showed additional species-level variation: Micropterus cahabae, restricted to the Cahaba River system; Micropterus tallapoosae, restricted to the Tallapoosa River system; Micropterus warriorensis, from the Black Warrior River system; and Micropterus chattahoochae, from the Chattahoochee River system. Naturally, Micropterus coosae resides in the Coosa River system. The redeye bass's most recent common ancestor (MRCA) can be dated to approximately 7.39 million years ago (Mya), with a potential range between 4.63 and ten Mya. The most recent speciation events from the largemouth and spotted bass likely happened between 0.68 and 0.76 Mya.

== Description ==
=== Body color and pattern ===
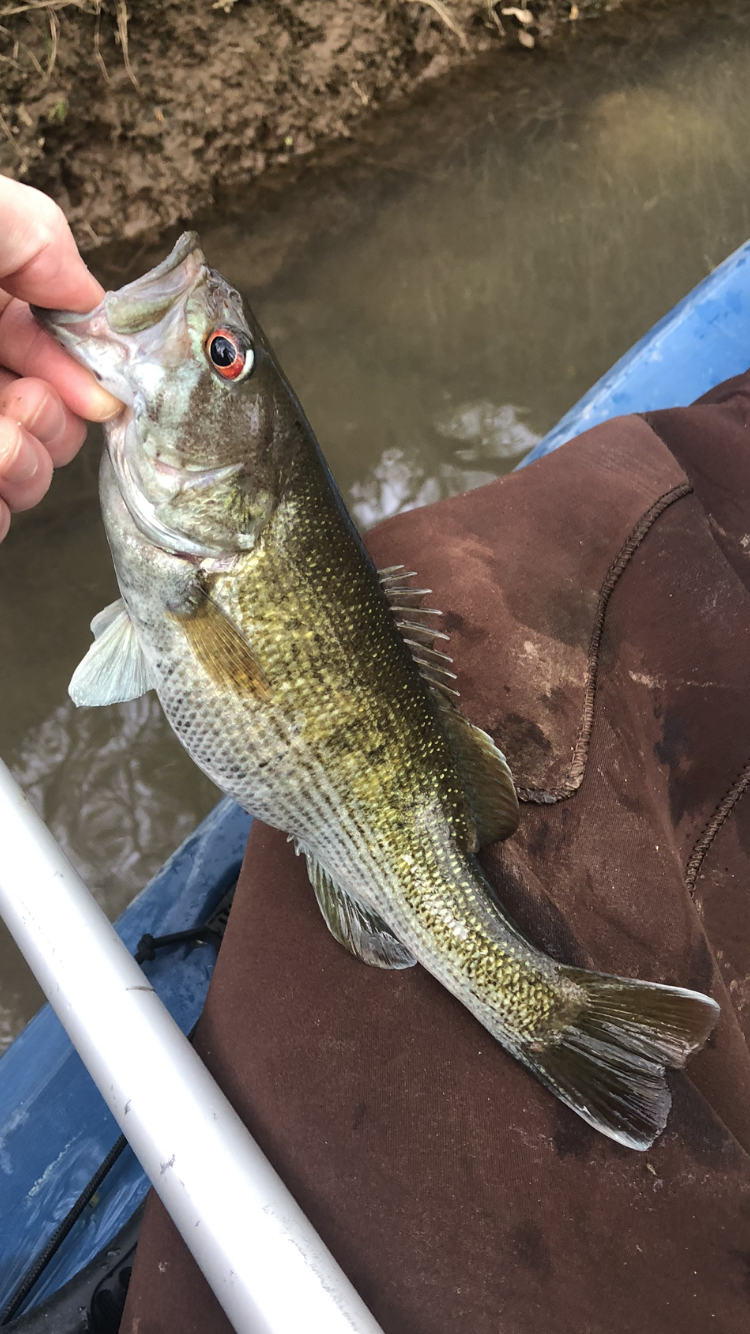
M. coosae held using "lipping" technique

Redeye bass are distinguished from other species of black basses due to a couple of subtle, but diagnostic features; the presence of a distinct silver-white crescent on the posterior (back) one-half of the eyeball, iridescent white, turquoise, or red on upper and lower margins of the caudal fin, a shallow emargination (notch) between the dorsal fins, and the absence of a dark mid-lateral (side) stripe along the body. The upper and lower margins of the caudal fin are edged in white, a useful feature for separating redeye bass from both smallmouth bass (Micropterus dolomieu) and shoal bass (M. cataractae). Unique from all other black basses, redeye typically have three dark bars on the cheek. Most individuals (about 76%) have 0–6 vertical black blotches near the front of the body, followed by softer spots toward the back. The back and sides of the fish are generally olive to brown with darker brown mottling.

=== Fin shape and features ===
The anterior (front) dorsal fin has dark green spines tipped in white with translucent green membranes, while the posterior (back) dorsal fin is red with the front five or six rays tipped in white; the base is green, the upper half red, and the last few membranes are transparent. The caudal fin is green at the base and red at the tips, with translucent membranes and a thin white border on the top and bottom edges. The anal fin is dark green at the base, red toward the tip, and edged in white, with membranes shifting from greenish white at the base to red in the middle and clear near the edge. The pelvic fins are white with black streaks, and the membranes are translucent white, while the pectoral fins have red rays with transparent membranes.

=== Sex and age differences ===
Notably, the red pigmentation in the fins occurs in both males and females throughout the year and is not linked to breeding or sexual dimorphism. Adults have several horizontal rows of dark spots on their lower sides, with breeding males have having a light bluish green color on the lower head and throat. On juveniles, the sides of the body usually have 10 to 12 dark blotches that do not join to form a lateral stripe (subterminal black band) across the caudal lobes (tail fin), with red coloration on the fins and a rusty red base of a caudal fin.

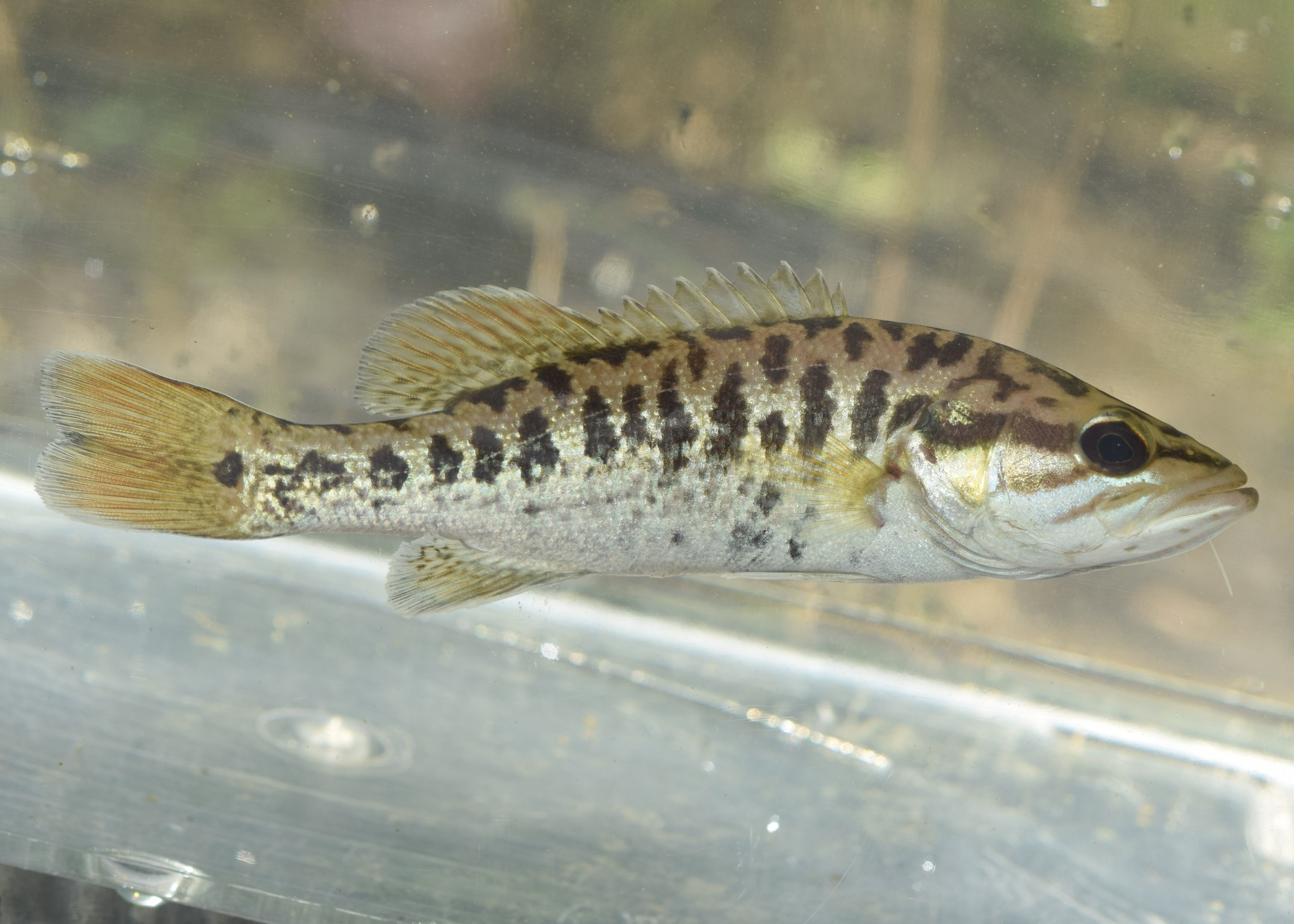
A small black bass photographed in a clear viewing tank. The eye is proportionally large, the snout slightly pointed, and the overall body form is slender, features consistent with a juvenile stage of the genus Micropterus.

=== Anatomical features ===
The upper jaw (maxilla) extends to the back of the eye, which is usually red. The redeye is an elongate, slender fish with a large mouth that extends to or slightly behind the rear margin of the eye. The dorsal fin contains nine to 11 (usually 10) spines and 11 to 13 (usually 12) rays, and the area between the two is only slightly notched. The anal fin contains three spines and nine to 11 (usually 10) rays. The complete lateral line has from 63 to 74 scales. Scales above the lateral line number 12 or 13. A small tooth patch is present on the tongue. The fish has relatively small ctenoid scales, containing a range of 66 to 73 lateral line scales, 6–9 scales above the lateral line, 10–13 below it, and 28–32 around the caudal peduncle (base of tailfin). A small tooth patch is present on the tongue, measured to be approximately 2 mm in size on average. Internally, the bass has a fairly narrow head and do not often exceed approximately 0.45 kg.

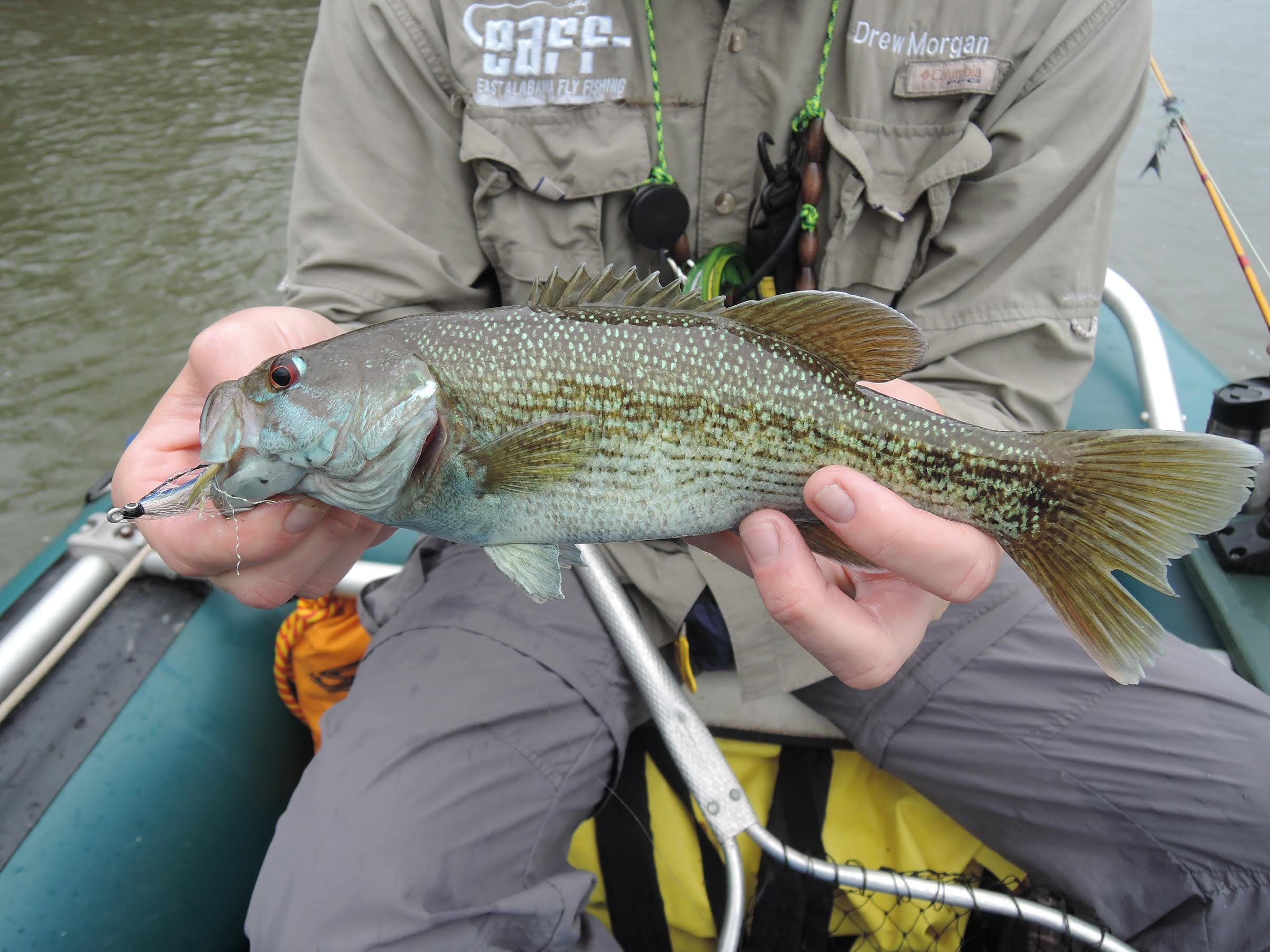
Male Micropterus tallapoosae

Growing to a maximum reported overall length of 47 cm (19 in), the redeye bass is one of the smaller black basses. The probable world record for redeye bass is 5 lb 2.5 oz (2.34 kg) from Lake Jocassee in South Carolina. Many redeye bass world record listings, especially those over 5 lb (2.3 kg) are actually records for the shoal bass.

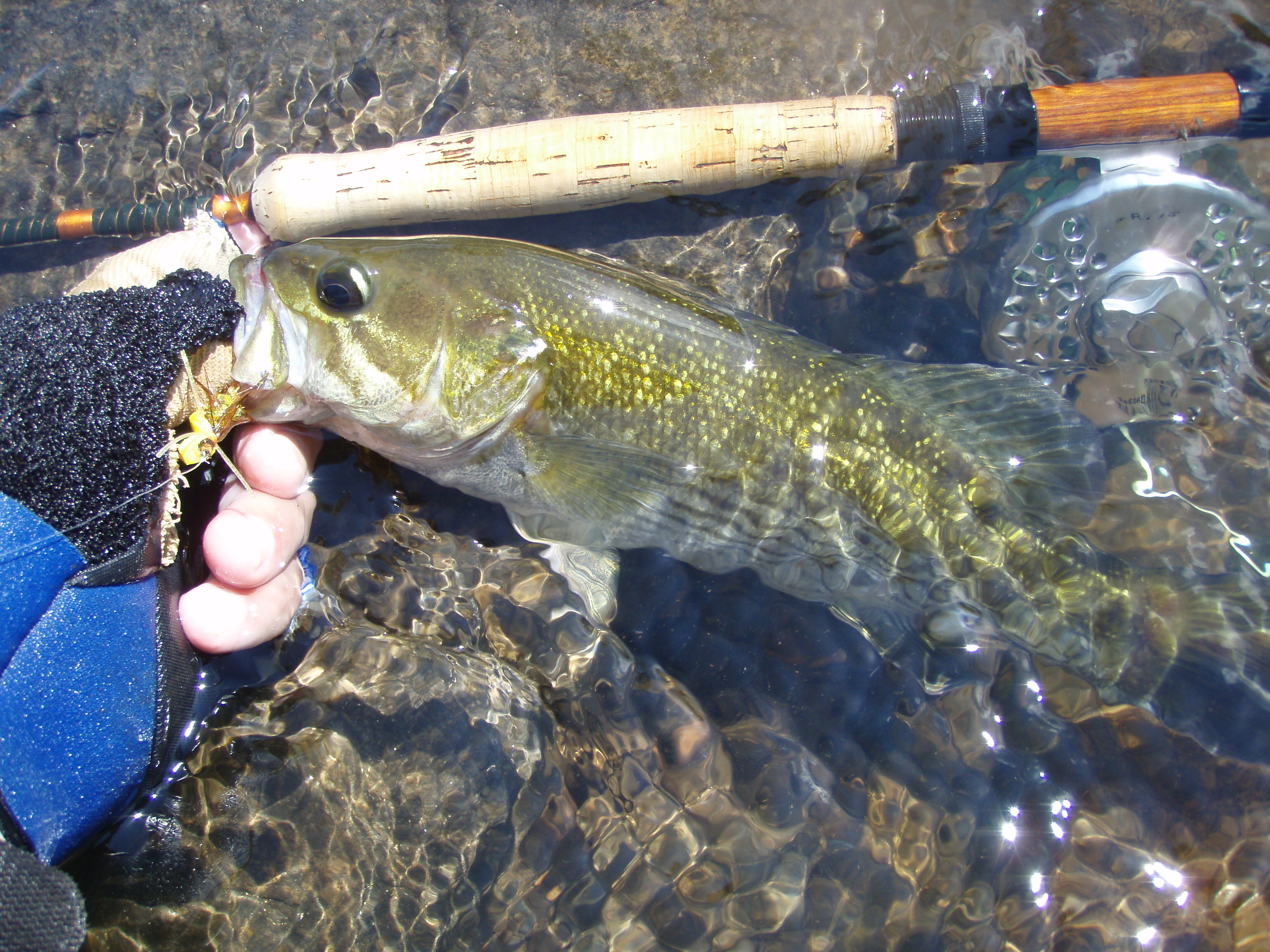
Fly rod-caught redeye bass, Tallapoosa River, Tallassee, Alabama (Released)

The rock bass (Ambloplites rupestris), a distinct species of Centrarchid, is sometimes called the redeye or redeye bass in Canada.

== Species distribution ==
The redeye bass is a predatory fish that is endemic to the Coosa River system in the southeastern United States, including Georgia and Alabama. It can also be found in states such as Tennessee, Florida, South Carolina, and North Carolina. Its occurrence in Georgia includes the Alabama River system, and Chattahoochee, Oconee, and Savannah Rivers. Sheed's Creek and Cohutta Creek are the only two streams in Tennessee in which this fish occurs naturally. While native to the area, the redeye bass is not known to occur within the Apalachicola River basin, where it is often mistaken as a shoal bass. Redeye bass are limited to upland streams with canopy cover, cool water temperatures, vegetative cover, undercut banks, and rock ledges or large boulders. The species typically avoids impoundments and navigational pools, due to competition with the larger Alabama bass and largemouth bass.

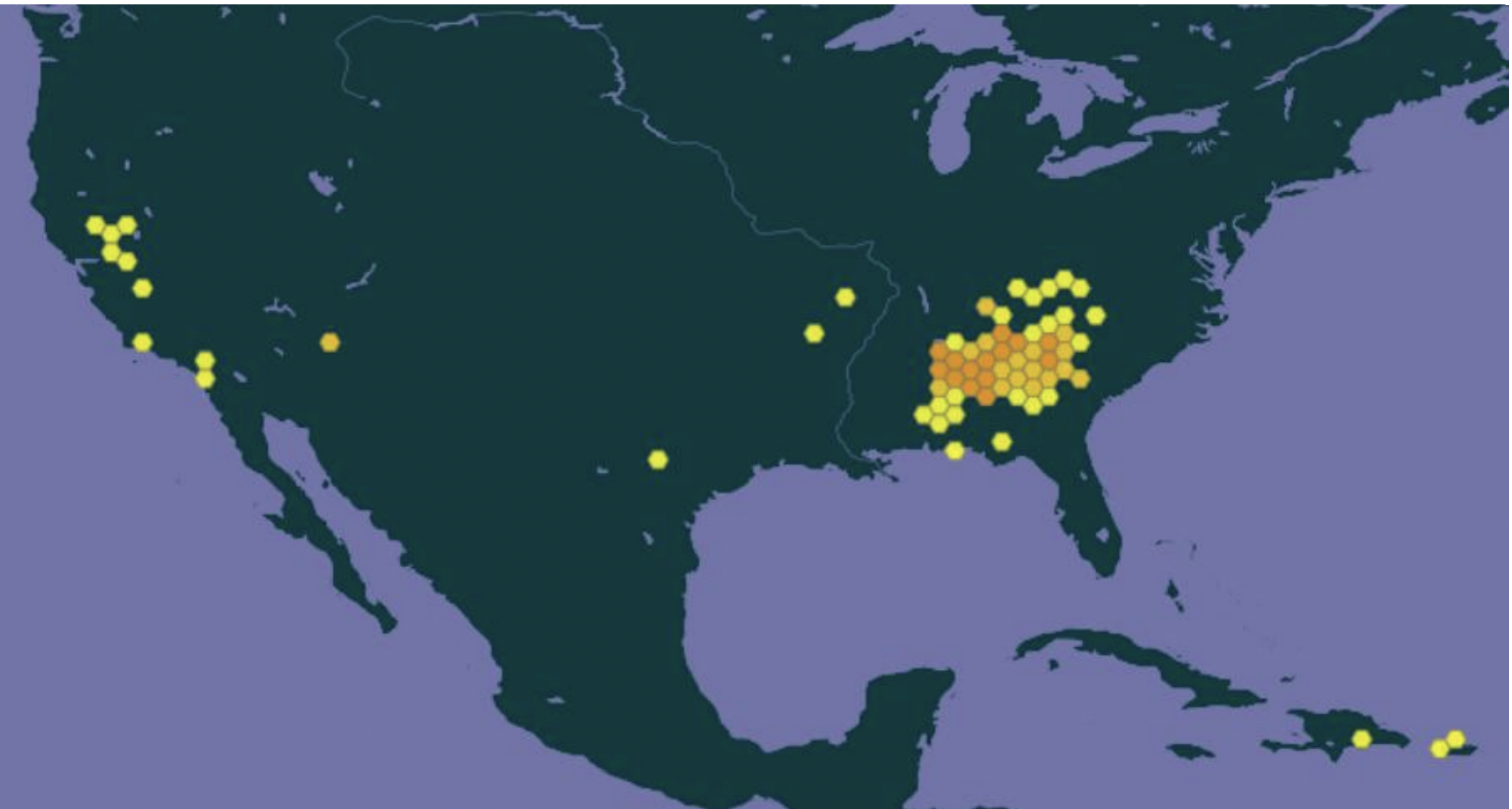
Reported global distribution of Micropterus coosae (U.S. Fish and Wildlife Service)

=== As an introduced species ===
In 1962 and 1964, redeye bass were introduced in California to provide angling (hook on a line to catch fish) in streams dominated by native fishes not favored by anglers, examples being introductions into the Stanislaus River (Tuolumne County), Feather River (Butte County), Alder Creek (Sacramento County), and Santa Margarita River (San Diego County). Now dominating in some California river ecosystems, the bass has eliminated native fishes. Introduced redeye bass additionally pose a threat to California's endemic frogs and the California tiger salamander (Ambystoma californiense). In 1969 redeye bass raised in the California Department of Fish and Wildlife's (CDFG) Central Valley Hatchery were planted in Oroville Reservoir (Butte County), where they became established and hybridized with smallmouth and spotted bass. The redeye bass is established in the Sisquoc River within the Santa Maria River basin. Introduced Micropterus coosae have displaced native hardhead (Mylopharodon conocephalus) in the Cosumnes River.

Coosa bass were also introduced into the Verde River and it's tributaries, of North Central Arizona. The introduction of these fishes were mistakenly imported to the region from Alabama thought to be smallmouth bass, and have since become well established since their introduction during the mid-1950s; in around 2021 these fishes were genetically identified as Micropterus coosae. Elsewhere, the redeye bass was introduced to Tennessee in the 1950s and has hybridized extensively with native smallmouth bass (M. dolomieu).

== Life history ==
Age, growth, and sexual maturity of redeye bass are not well understood, however, maximum age is assumed to be about 9–10 years, while sexual maturity was estimated at three or four years The growth rate of the redeye bass compared with other gamefish is particularly slow. The growth is greatest its first year and gradually decreases as the fish become older. On average, a 10-year-old redeye bass grows about 1 inch in length each year. In their native streams, redeye bass and closely related species inhabit clear, cool water with large, rocky pools, where they are opportunistic predators on fish and invertebrates, especially adult aquatic and terrestrial insects. Larger redeye bass tend to dominate low velocity, deep pools, while smaller bass tend to be absent from these pools and are primarily found in shallow, fast-moving riffles. Intermediate-sized redeye bass tend to be found in runs or shallow pools. Diet for large redeye bass typically includes crayfish, dobsonfly nymphs, mayfly nymphs and adults, and damselfly nymphs. They are opportunistic predators that feed on the surface, in the water column, and on the bottom. Small juveniles feed mainly on aquatic insects, but have successfully preyed on mosquitofish in shallow water. The bass tends to move up small tributary streams or to the heads of pools in larger streams to spawn in late spring when temperatures rise to 17–21 °C. Males construct nests in beds of gravel. Spawning and parental behavior is presumably similar to that of smallmouth bass.

== Conservation status ==
Historically, redeye bass were not heavily pursued as a sport fish, although recreational angling has recently increased for redeye bass from streams. Now, members of the redeye bass complex are popular sport fish that occur above the Fall Line in the Appalachian foothill streams of several southeastern U.S. states. While the slow growth of M. coosae coupled with their vulnerability to angling could have serious implications for their population size, redeye bass remain to have been solely responsible for the near elimination of native fishes in the middle reaches of the Cosumnes River. Redeye bass has proved capable of becoming established in streams with various degrees of alteration throughout California, consequently becoming a major threat to native fishes. The International Union for Conservation of Nature (IUCN) rating of redeye bass is conservative because of their takeover of large stretches of the Cosumnes River. In many reaches of the Cosumnes, 99% of the fish are redeye bass. Native minnows and suckers are largely gone from these reaches and are present mainly in areas where redeye bass are absent. The disastrous success of their invasion of the Cosumnes was largely unappreciated because the redeye bass had been misidentified for years as smallmouth bass. It is likely that they are more widespread than presently recognized in the Stanislaus River and elsewhere in San Joaquin Valley streams. M. coosae's small adult size, aggressive behavior, and generalized habitat and feeding requirements presumably allow them to dominate foothill streams. They have not provided much of a fishery because most California anglers do not know they exist and they are rather small and slow-growing for a game fish.
