= Reeve Maclaren Bailey =

American ichthyologist (1911–2011)

Reeve Maclaren Bailey (May 2, 1911, in Fairmont, West Virginia – July 2, 2011, in Ann Arbor, Michigan) was an American ichthyologist.

Born in West Virginia, Bailey was raised in Perrysburg and Toledo, Ohio. In 1944, he returned to University of Michigan as a curator of fishes at the Museum of Zoology. He conducted extensive field research in the U.S., Bermuda, Guatemala, Bolivia, Paraguay, Zambia, and Thailand. Bailey was awarded a bachelor's degree in herpetology and a Doctor of Philosophy degree in ichthyology from the University of Michigan in 1938. Bailey was the president of the American Fisheries Society in 1974–1975.

== Personal life ==
In 1939, Bailey married Marian Kregel. They had four children. She predeceased him in 2009. He died in 2011, aged 100, and was survived by his four children, three grandchildren, and two great–grandchildren.
