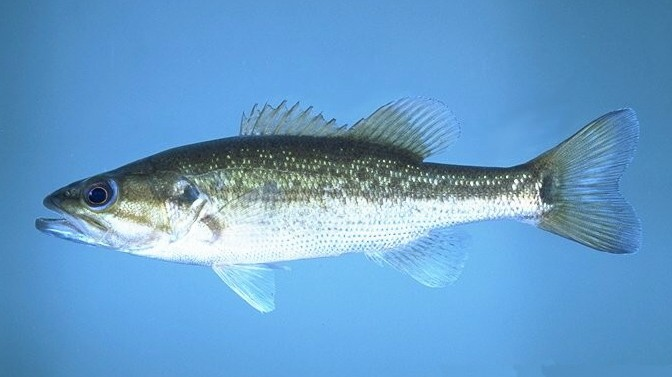

Conservation status
- Least Concern (IUCN 3.1)

Scientific classification
- Kingdom: Animalia
- Phylum: Chordata
- Class: Actinopterygii
- Order: Centrarchiformes
- Family: Centrarchidae
- Genus: Micropterus
- Species: M. punctulatus

Binomial name
- Micropterus punctulatus (Rafinesque, 1819)

Synonyms
- Calliurus punctulatus Rafinesque, 1819

= Spotted bass =

Species of fish

The spotted bass (Micropterus punctulatus), also called spotty, or spots in various fishing communities, is a species of North American freshwater fish belonging to the sunfish family (Centrarchidae) of the order Centrarchiformes. It is noted for the rows of dark spots below the lateral line, which give it its common name. One of the black basses, it is native to the Mississippi River basin and across the Gulf states, from central Texas through the Florida panhandle. Its native range extends into the western Mid-Atlantic states and it has been introduced into western North Carolina and Virginia. It has also been introduced to southern Africa, where it has become established in some isolated waters as an invasive species.

Spotted bass can reach an overall length of almost 64 cm (25 in), and can weigh up to 5.2 kg (11 lb). It can live to an age of at least seven years. Preferring cool and warm mountain streams and reservoirs with rocky bottoms, the spotted bass feeds on insects, crustaceans, frogs, annelid worms and smaller fish. It is often mistaken for the similar and more common largemouth bass. A convenient way to distinguish between a largemouth and a spotted bass is by the size of the mouth. A spotted bass will resemble a largemouth bass in coloration but will have a smaller mouth.

In 2010, the scientific community officially recognized a separate subspecies of spotted bass, native to the Tallapoosa and Coosa Rivers and their lakes. This species is commonly known as the Alabama spotted bass (M. henshalli) and known locally as the "Coosa spotted bass", not to be confused with the redeye Coosa bass found in north Georgia. The Alabama spotted bass is highly prized as a gamefish and average size is much larger than the more common Kentucky spotted bass. The current record spotted bass, caught in Pine Flat Lake in California, weighed 10.27 lb (4.66 kg).

== Etymology ==
Micropterus means small fin, and punctulatus means dotted.

== Description ==
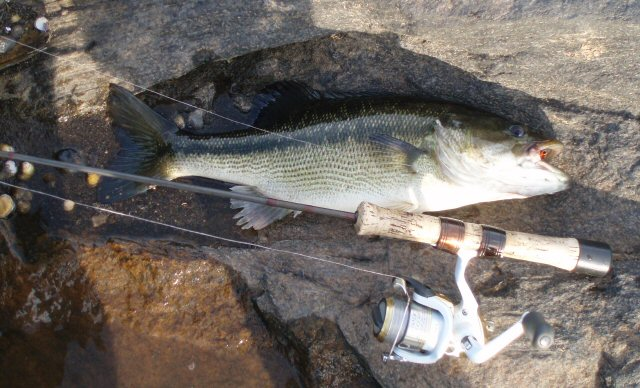
Typical spotted bass from Tallapoosa River near Tallassee, Alabama (released)

Many anglers who catch a spotted bass mistake it for a largemouth bass due to the coloration, although there are subtle differences. The spotted bass, like all black basses except the largemouth, has scales on the base portion of the second dorsal fin, its first and second dorsal fin are clearly connected, and its upper jaw bone does not extend back to or beyond the rear edge of the eyes.

The spotted bass is also often confused with a smallmouth bass (or "smally" for short), but it lacks the vertical bars that are present on the sides of a smallmouth's body. The spotted bass also has small black spots below the lateral line unlike either the large or smallmouth bass. Juveniles often resemble the young smallmouth bass in having a broad band of orange at the base of the tail, followed by a broad black band and white edge. The spotted bass is known to hybridize with the smallmouth, which sometimes makes identification difficult. Spotted bass can be found in deeper water than smallmouth bass, at depths up to 100 ft (30 m).

== Distribution and habitat ==
Spotted bass seem to be segregated by habitat type from closely related species such as the largemouth and smallmouth bass. They tend to be found in areas with more water current than the largemouth, and usually inhabit areas that are too warm, turbid and sluggish for smallmouth bass. They usually occur around aquatic vegetation, submerged logs, and rock or riprap walls in small to large flowing streams, rivers, and reservoirs. Spotted bass are distributed throughout the Ohio River basin as well as the central and lower Mississippi River basin. The species may be found in Gulf Coast states from Texas east to Florida. Spotted bass are native to portions of East Texas, particularly in the Sabine, Neches and Cypress Rivers.

== Diet ==
Spotted bass usually feed on small fishes, crayfish and aquatic insects. The young begin with copepods and other small crustaceans and soon begin to eat insects. The spotted bass' diet falls in between the largemouth and smallmouth bass. It isn't nearly as predatory as the largemouth and only consumes about half the amount of the fish. Like all bass the spotted bass feeds by opening its mouth and creating a negative pressure that sucks in the prey.

== Reproduction and life cycle ==
The spotted bass can live approximately six years. Spawning occurs from April to May in habitat similar to that used by smallmouth. The males build their nest in gravel or other substrate, then entices a female to deposit her eggs. The males guard the eggs until they disperse. Several spotted and smallmouth bass hybrids have been collected recently in area reservoirs suggesting there is occasionally competition between the two species for spawning habitat.

== Importance to humans ==
The spotted bass is a popular game fish that is fished regularly. In this context spotted bass is a good food fish for human consumption.

== Invasive species ==
The spotted bass was introduced to the Thee River, Olifants‐Doring River system, Western Cape Province, South Africa, as game fish before 2007, and is now rated as an invasive species. The population was successfully eradicated in 2014, where gillnets and hand nets were used to remove the majority of the stock, while individuals were also caught by spearguns, seine nets and backpack electrofishing. The spotted bass was held responsible for a decline in abundance of native fiery redfin (Pseudobarbus phlegethon Barnard, 1938) and Cape galaxias (Galaxias zebratus Castelnau, 1861).

== See also ==
- Guadalupe bass
