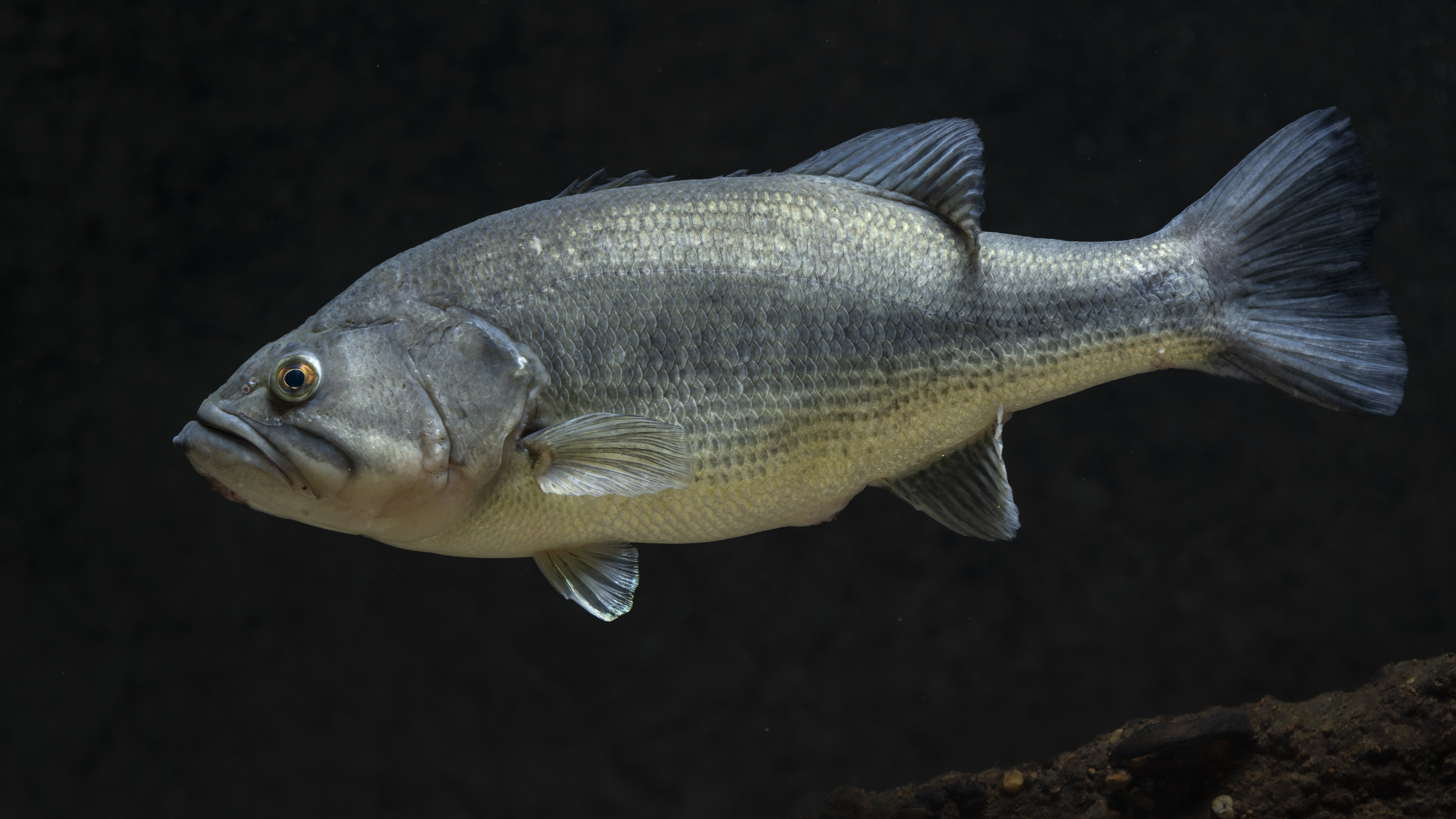

Conservation status
- Least Concern (IUCN 3.1)

- Secure (NatureServe)

Scientific classification
- Kingdom: Animalia
- Phylum: Chordata
- Class: Actinopterygii
- Division: Teleostei
- Order: Centrarchiformes
- Family: Centrarchidae
- Genus: Micropterus
- Species: M. nigricans

Binomial name
- Micropterus nigricans (Cuvier, 1828)

Synonyms
- List: Labrus salmoides Lacepède, 1802; Aplites salmoides (Lacepède, 1802); Grystes salmoides (Lacepède, 1802); Huro salmoides (Lacepède, 1802); Huro nigricans Cuvier, 1828; Grystes nigricans (Cuvier, 1828); Perca nigricans (Cuvierr, 1828); Grystes megastoma Garlick, 1857

= Largemouth bass =

Species of black bass

The largemouth bass (Micropterus nigricans) is a carnivorous, freshwater, ray-finned fish in the Centrarchidae (sunfish) family, native to the eastern and central United States, southeastern Canada and northern Mexico. It is known by a variety of regional names, such as the widemouth bass, bigmouth bass, black bass, largie, potter's fish, Florida bass or Florida largemouth, green bass, bucketmouth bass, green trout, growler, Gilsdorf bass, Oswego bass, southern largemouth, northern largemouth, Alabama bass or Alabama largemouth, marsh bass, and swamp bass.

The largemouth bass, as it is known today, was first described by French naturalist Georges Cuvier in 1828. A 2022 study concluded that the correct scientific name for the Florida bass is Micropterus salmoides, while the largemouth bass is Micropterus nigricans. It is the largest species of the black bass, with a maximum recorded length of 29.5 inches (75 cm) and an unofficial weight of 25 pounds 1 ounce (11.4 kg). Reports from Cuba speculate bass as large as 13.5 kg (30 lb), where invasive largemouth thrive.

The largemouth bass is the state fish of Georgia and Mississippi, and the state freshwater fish of Florida and Alabama. It is a highly prized sport fish among anglers for their vigorous resistance when caught, and have been introduced to many regions due to their popularity in bass fishing and tolerance to urban streams. However, they have become an invasive species in some areas, causing the decline, displacement or extinction of native species through predation and competition.

== Taxonomy ==
The largemouth bass was first formally described as Labrus salmoides in 1802 by the French naturalist Bernard Germain de Lacépède with the type locality given as the Carolinas. Lacépède based his description on an illustration of a specimen collected by Louis Bosc near Charleston, South Carolina. Recent phylogenomic studies, however, place the type locality given by Lacépède as within the range of the Florida bass (M. salmoides) and outside that of the largemouth bass. This study concludes that Lacépède's name is the correct binomial for the Florida bass and that the oldest available binomial for the largemouth bass is Cuvier's Huro nigricans, which has a type locality of Lake Huron which is within the range of the largemouth bass.

== Description ==
The largemouth bass is an olive green to greenish-gray fish, marked by a series of dark, sometimes black, blotches forming a jagged horizontal stripe along each flank. The upper jaw (maxilla) of a largemouth bass extends beyond the rear margin of the orbit.

The largemouth bass is the largest of the black basses, reaching a maximum recorded overall length of 29.5 in (75 cm) and a maximum unofficial weight of 25 lb 1 oz (11.4 kg). Sexual dimorphism is found, with the female larger than the male.

Largemouth bass prefer habitats with abundant littoral vegetation and generally maintain relatively small home ranges in lakes. They have an average lifespan of 10 to 16 years in the wild.

== Feeding ==
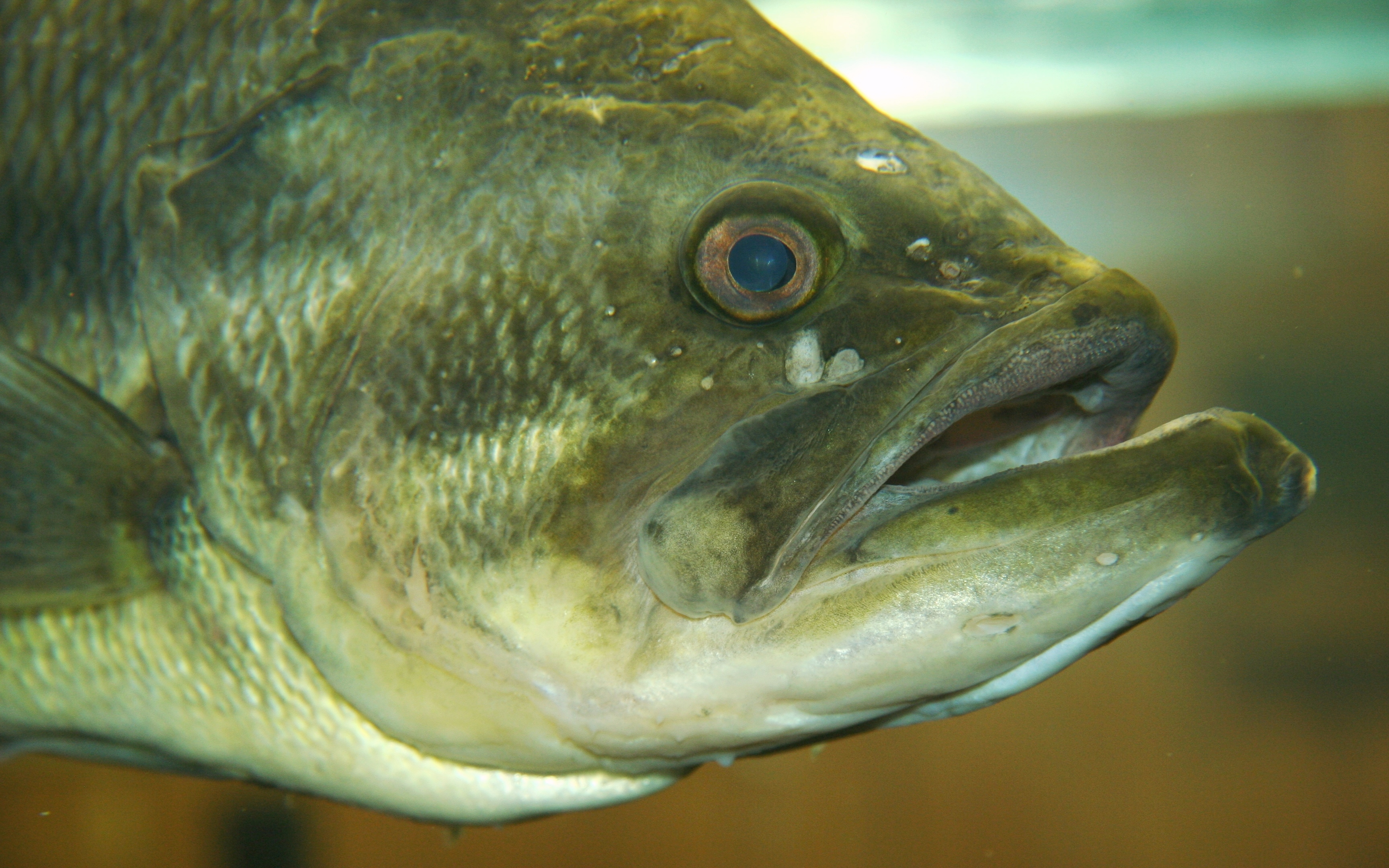
Head closeup

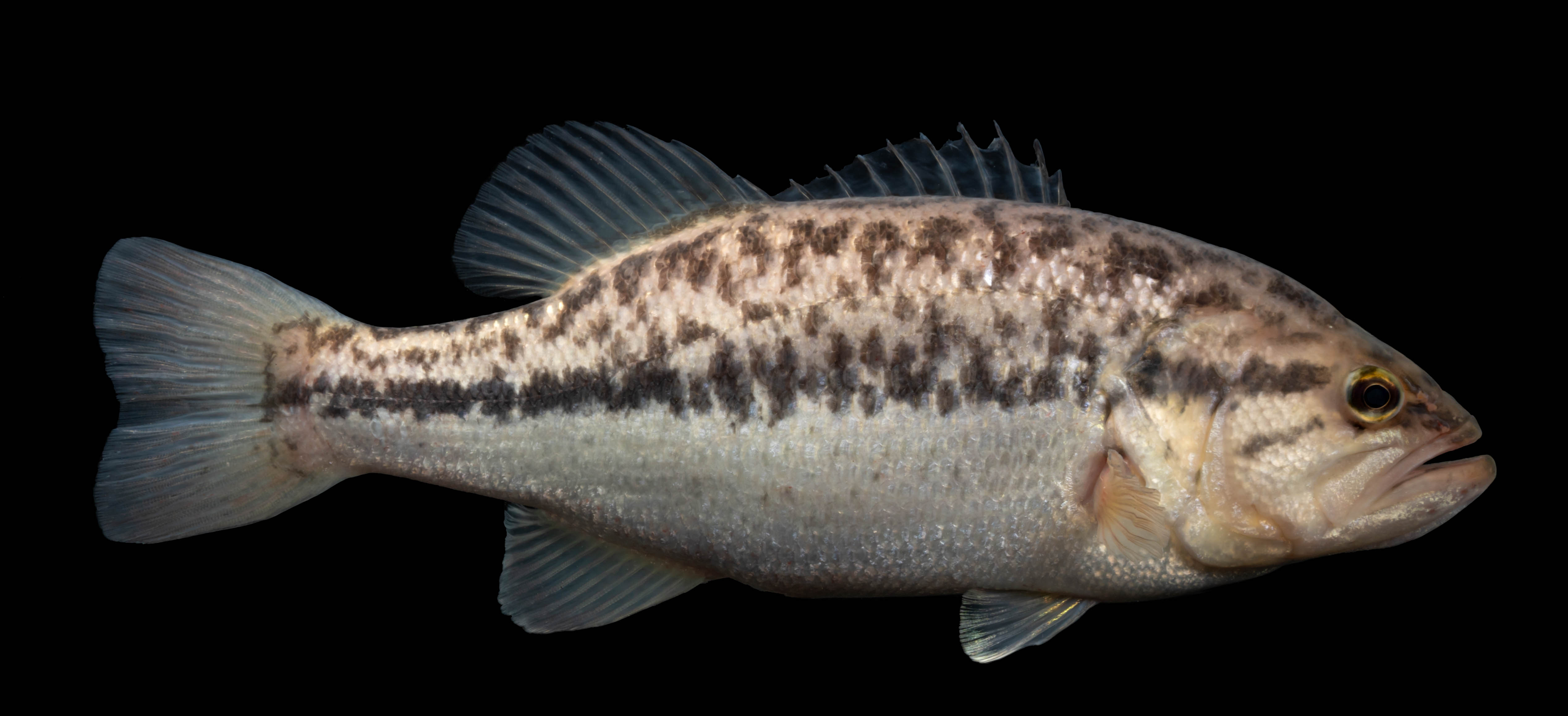
At Gavins Point National Fish Hatchery

Juvenile largemouth bass consumes mostly small bait fish, scuds, water fleas, copepods, small shrimp, and insects. Adults consume smaller fish (bluegill, banded killifish, minnows, juvenile bass), shad, worms, snails, crawfish, frogs, snakes, and salamanders. In larger lakes and reservoirs, adult bass occupy slightly deeper water than younger fish, and shift to a diet consisting almost entirely of smaller fish like shad, yellow perch, ciscoes, suckers, shiners, other cyprinids, freshwater silversides, and sunfish (such as bluegill and green sunfish). It also consumes younger members of larger fish species, such as catfish, trout, walleye, carp, white bass, striped bass, and even smaller black bass. Among the crayfish species preyed upon include Faxonius difficilis, F. harrisonii, F. hartfieldi, and Procambarus clarkii. Prey items can be as large as 50% of the bass's body length or larger.

Studies of prey utilization by largemouths show that in weedy waters, bass grow more slowly due to difficulty in acquiring prey. Less weed cover allows bass to more easily find and catch prey, but this consists of more open-water baitfish. With little or no cover, bass can devastate the prey population and starve or be stunted. Fisheries managers must consider these factors when designing regulations for specific bodies of water. Under overhead cover, such as overhanging banks, brush, or submerged structure, such as weedbeds, points, humps, ridges, and drop-offs, the largemouth bass uses its senses of hearing, sight, vibration, and smell to attack and seize its prey. Adult largemouth are generally apex predators within their habitat, but they are preyed upon by many animals while young, including great blue herons, larger bass, northern pike, walleye, muskellunge, yellow perch, channel catfish, northern water snakes, crappie, common carp, and American eels. Multiple species of kingfishers, bitterns, and other herons feed on this bass, as well. Both the young and adult largemouths are targeted by the bald eagle.

Notably in the Great Lakes region, Micropterus nigricans along with many other species of native fish have been known to prey upon the invasive round goby (Neogobius melanostomus). Remains of said fish have been found inside the stomachs of largemouth bass consistently. This feeding habit may impact the ecosystem positively, but more research must be conducted to verify this. It is illegal to use or possess live Neogobius melanostomus as bait in the Great Lakes region.

== Spawning ==
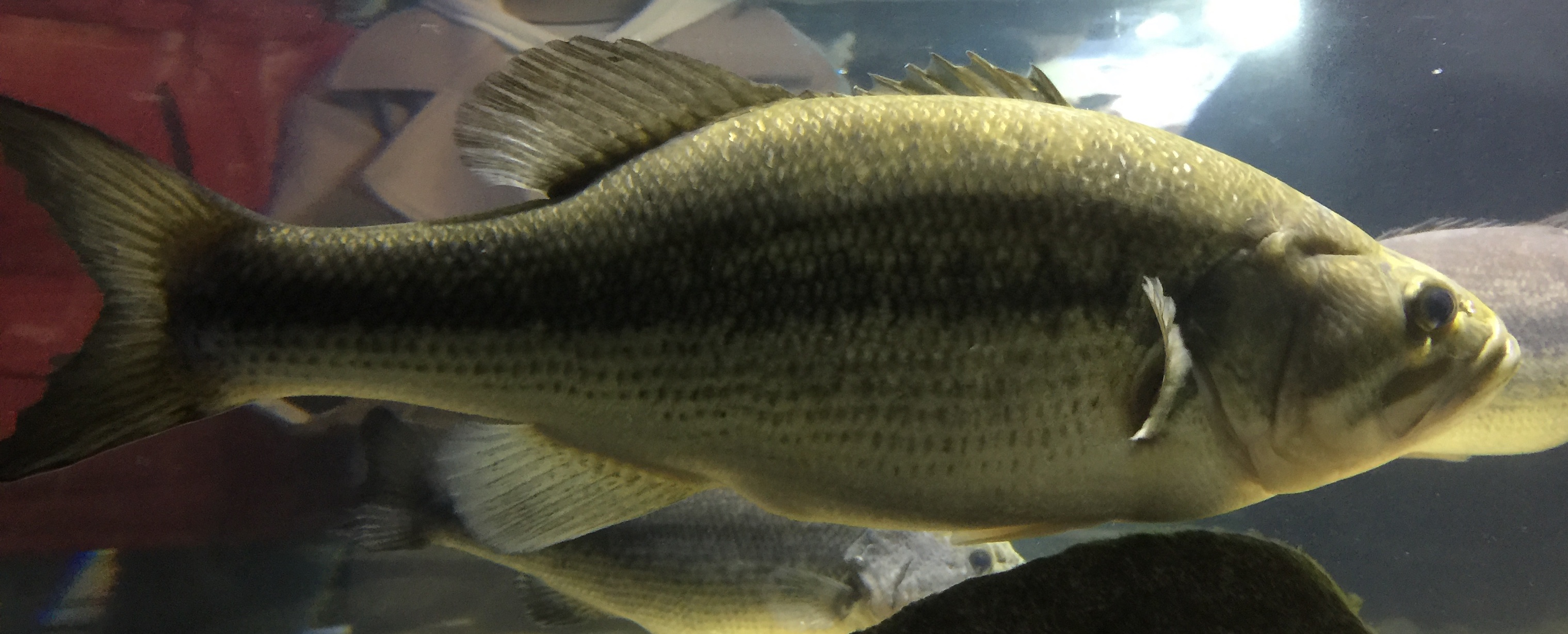
Side view of a living largemouth bass

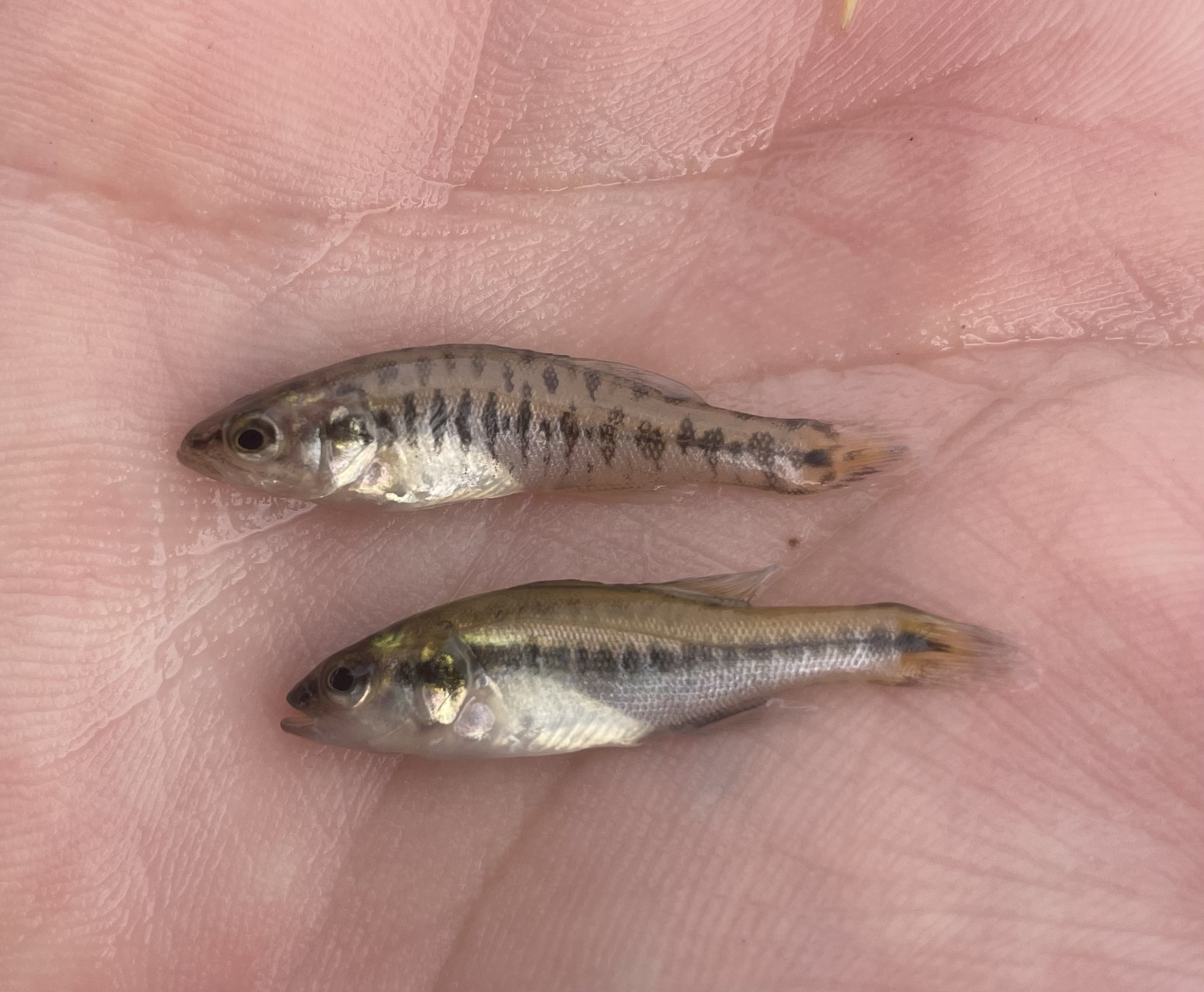
Juvenile (bottom) compared to juvenile Guadalupe bass (top), in Texas

Largemouth bass usually reach sexual maturity and begin spawning when they are about a year old. Spawning takes place in the spring season when the water temperature first remains continuously above 60 °F (16 °C) for a sufficient period of time. In the northern region of the United States and Canada, this usually occurs anywhere from late April until early July. In the southern states, where the largest and healthiest specimens typically inhabit, this process can begin in March and is usually over by June. Males form nests by moving debris from the bottom of the body of water using their tails. These nests are usually about twice the length of the males, although this can vary. Bass prefer sand, muck, or gravel bottoms, but will also use rocky and weedy bottoms where there is cover for their nest, such as roots or twigs. After finishing the nest, the males swim near the nest looking for a female to mate with. After one is found, the two bass swim around the nest together, turning their bodies so that the eggs and sperm that are being released will come in contact on the way down to the nest. Bass will usually spawn twice per spring, with some spawning three or four times, although this is not as common. The male will then guard the nest until the eggs hatch, which can take about two to four days in the southern US and Northern Mexico, and slightly longer in the northern part of its native range. Finally, depending on the water temperature, the male will stay with the nest until the infant bass are ready to swim out on their own, which can be about two more weeks after they hatch. After this, the male, female, and newborns will switch to more of a summer mode, in which they then focus more on feeding.

== Angling ==
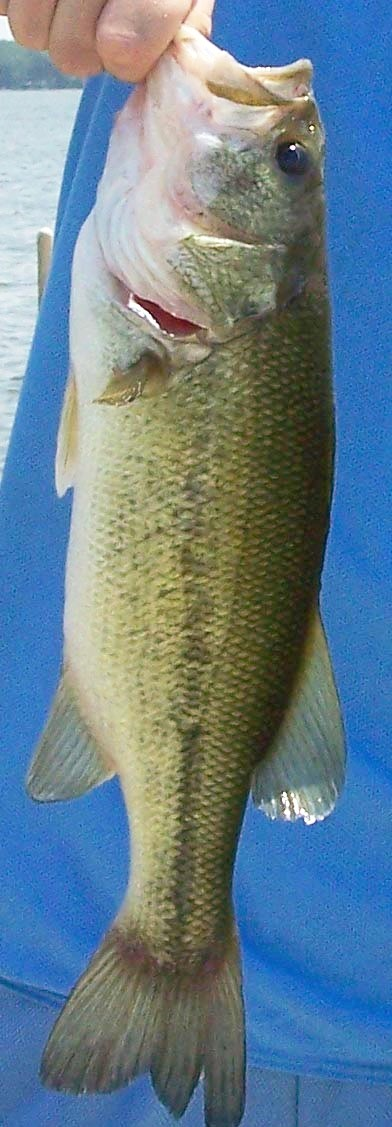
A largemouth bass caught by an angler

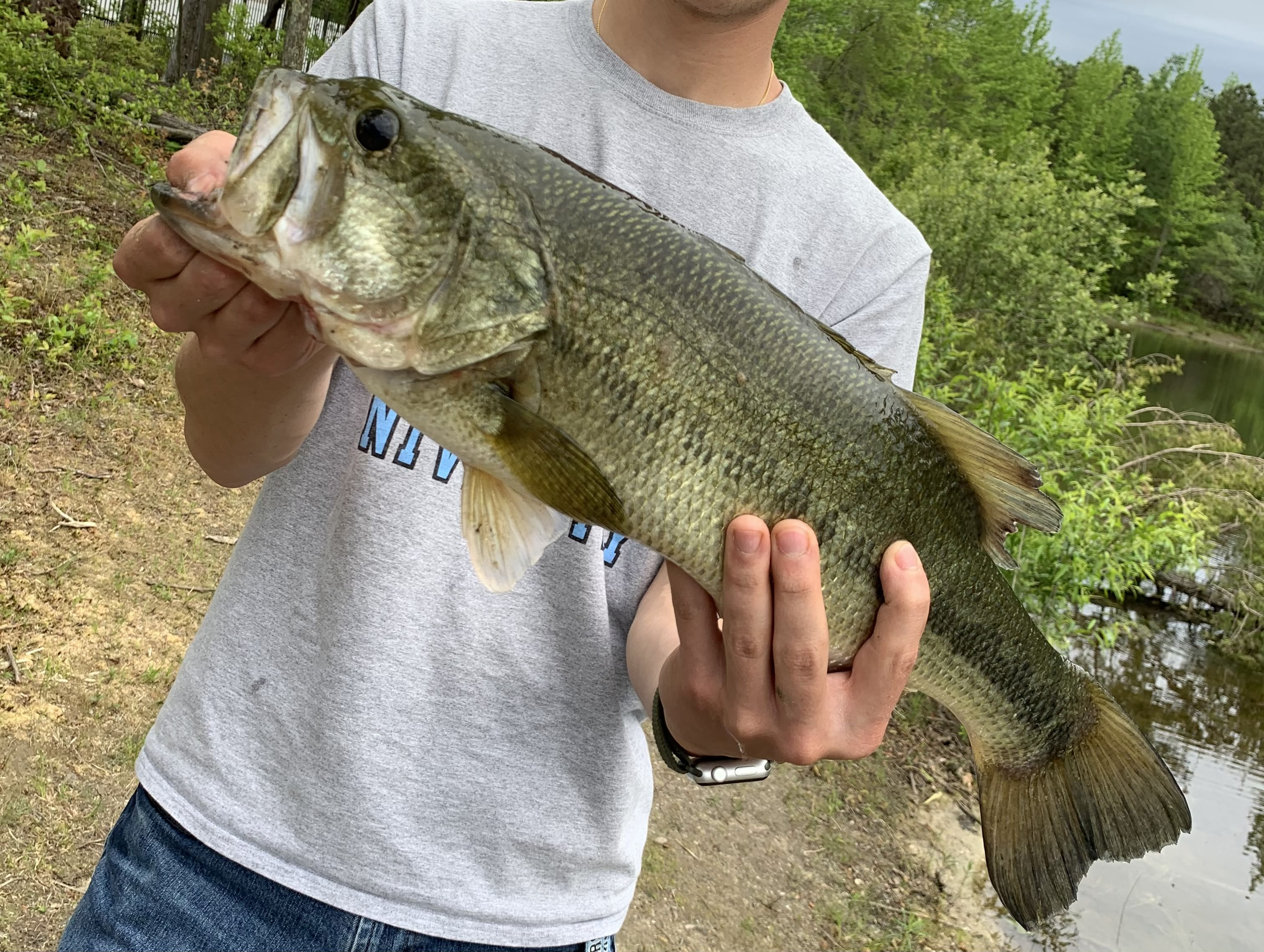
Largemouth bass caught in New Jersey

Largemouth bass are keenly sought after by anglers and are noted for the excitement of their 'fight', meaning how vigorously the fish resists being hauled into the boat or onto shore after being hooked. The fish will often become airborne in their effort to throw the hook, but many say that their cousin species, the smallmouth bass, is even more aggressive. Anglers most often fish for largemouth bass with lures such as spinnerbaits, plastic worms (and other plastic baits), jigs, crankbaits, and live bait, such as worms and minnows. A recent trend is the use of large swimbaits to target trophy bass that often forage on juvenile rainbow trout in California. Fly fishing for largemouth bass, while uncommon, may be done using both topwater and worm imitations tied with natural or synthetic materials. Other live baits, such as frogs or crawfish, can also be productive. Large golden shiners are a popular live bait used to catch trophy bass, especially when they are sluggish in the heat of summer or in the cold of winter. Largemouth bass usually hang around big patches of weeds and other shallow water cover. These fish are very capable of surviving in a wide variety of climates and waters. They are perhaps one of the world's most tolerant freshwater fish.

The world record largemouth according to the IGFA is shared by Manabu Kurita and George W. Perry. Kurita's bass was caught from Lake Biwa in Japan on July 2, 2009, and weighed 10.12 kilograms (22 lb 5 oz). Perry's bass was caught on June 2, 1932, from Montgomery Lake in Georgia and weighed 10.09 kilograms (22 lb 4 oz). This record is shared because the IGFA states a new record must beat the old record by at least 2 ounces.

== Invasive species ==
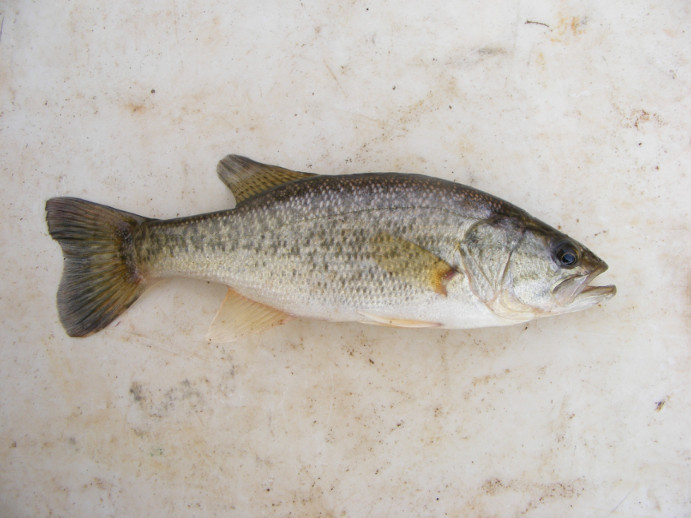
Invasive largemouth bass, in South Africa

The largemouth bass has been introduced into many other regions and countries due to its popularity as a sport fish and tolerance to urban environments. It causes the decline, displacement or extinctions of species in its new habitat through predation and competition, for example in Namibia. They are also an invasive species in the Canadian province of New Brunswick, and are on the watch list across much of the far northern US and Canada. In colder waters, these fish are often a danger to native fish fry such as salmon and trout. They have also been blamed for the extinction of the Atitlán grebe, a large waterbird which once inhabited Lake Atitlán in Guatemala. In 2011, researchers found that in streams and rivers in the Iberian Peninsula, juvenile largemouth bass were able to demonstrate trophic plasticity, meaning that they were able to adjust their feeding habits to obtain the necessary amount of energy needed to survive. This allows them to be successful as an invasive species in relatively stable aquatic food webs. Similarly, a study done in Japan showed that the introduction of both largemouth bass and bluegill into farm ponds have caused increases in the numbers of benthic organisms, resulting from the predation on fishes, crustaceans, and nymphal odonates by the bass. The largemouth bass has been causing sharp decreases in native fish populations in Japan since 1996, especially in bitterling fish in Lake Izunuma-Uchinuma.

== Conservation ==
To better understand the effects of angling on largemouth bass populations, researchers have studied physiological variation in the largemouth bass. One study found that in areas where angling was high, there was a significant effect on bass physiology. In stress tests, bass from protected areas had increased cortisol responsiveness compared to those in the highly active fisheries. The largemouth bass in Freshwater Protected Areas also had a higher aerobic scope, potentially providing them with more energy for growth, reproduction, and responding to environmental change. Another study found that maternal exposure to the stress hormone cortisol resulted in a lower responsiveness to angling stressors in their progeny. These studies in tandem provide evidence that repeated exposure to stress hormones and high angling pressure can bring out suboptimal phenotypes in largemouth bass populations.
