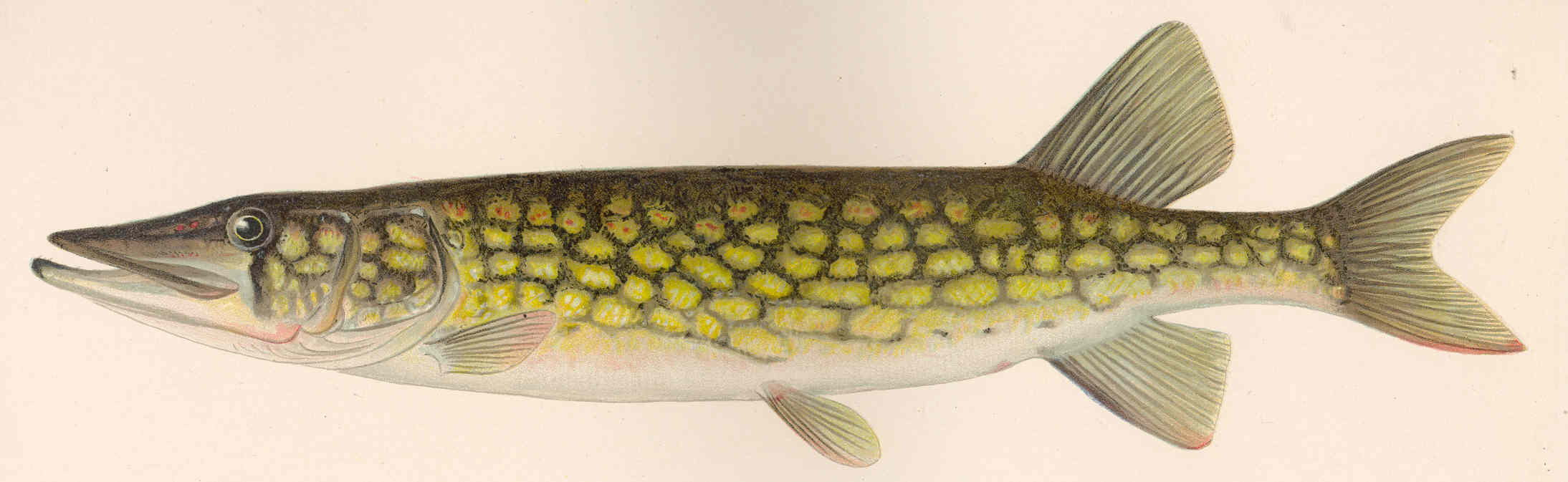
- Illustration of Esox niger.

Conservation status
- Least Concern (IUCN 3.1)

Scientific classification
- Kingdom: Animalia
- Phylum: Chordata
- Class: Actinopterygii
- Order: Salmoniformes
- Family: Esocidae
- Genus: Esox
- Species: E. niger

Binomial name
- Esox niger Lesueur, 1818

Synonyms
- Esox reticulatus (Lesueur, 1818)

= Chain pickerel =

Species of freshwater fish

The chain pickerel (Esox niger), also known as Jackfish, Mud Pike, or Southern Pike is a species of freshwater fish in the pike family (family Esocidae) of order Esociformes. The chain pickerel and the American pickerel (E. americanus) belong to the Esox genus of pike.

== Taxonomy ==
French naturalist Charles Alexandre Lesueur described the chain pickerel in 1818. Its species name is the Latin word niger "black".

Nicknames include the "southern pike", "grass pike", "jack", "jackfish", "gunny" and "eastern pickerel". In central Florida the chain pickerel is known locally as "Gatorfish"

== Description ==
The chain pickerel has a distinctive, dark, chain-like pattern on its greenish sides. There is a vertical dark marking underneath the eye, which helps to distinguish the chain pickerel from redfin pickerel (Esox americanus americanus) and grass pickerel (E. a. vermiculatus), in which the mark curves posteriorly. Its body outline resembles that of the northern pike (E. lucius). Unlike northern pike, however, the opercles and cheeks of chain pickerel are entirely scaled. It may reach up to 78.7 centimetres (31.0 in) long only on rare occasions. The average size for chain pickerel, however, is 24 in (61 cm) and 3 lb (1 1/2 kg). (The average chain pickerel caught by fishermen is under 2 lb.) It lives around 8 yr. In some places the pickerel is known as a "gunfish", "gunny" or "slime dart", due to its characteristic slime coating.

A blue color morph lacking the usual reticulated pattern has been described in a New York population.

== Distribution ==
Chain pickerel's range. The species is considered invasive in some northern regions, like Nova Scotia.

Its range is along the eastern coast of North America from southern Canada to Florida, and west to Texas. In the New England, the species occurs in Maine and New Hampshire. The fish inhabits fresh and brackish water from the Mississippi Valley. It also is commonly found in Lake Michigan and the lower portion of the Great Lakes. In the Canadian Maritimes, chain pickerel is known from New Brunswick and Nova Scotia.

Chain pickerel is considered an invasive species in Nova Scotia, where native fish stocks have been severely impacted by the effects of its introduction, primarily through its role as a voracious predator. Historical angling destinations in the province's mainland, like Kejimkujik National Park, have been heavily impacted by the illegal introduction of this fish to the area.

== Habitat ==
Chain pickerel live in a variety of habitats, including pools within creeks or rivers, lakes with vegetation cover, swamps and other wetlands. Chain pickerel are tolerant of brackish water with salinity levels of up to 22 ppt. They are also acid tolerant to a pH of 3.8.

== Diet ==
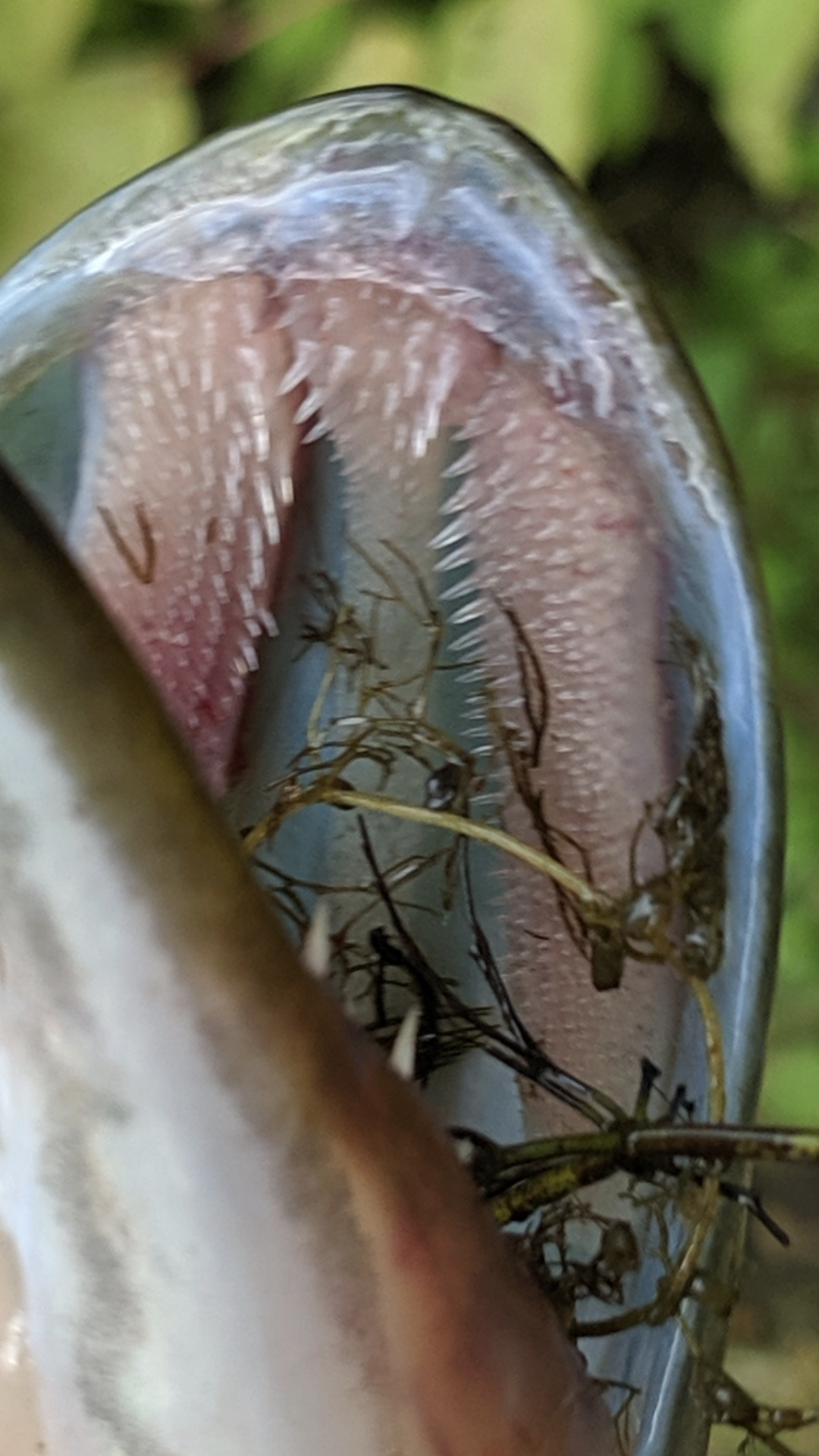
The roof of a chain pickerel's mouth, showing several rows of angled, sharp teeth.

Like the northern pike, the chain pickerel feeds primarily on smaller fish, until it grows large enough to ambush large fish from cover with a rapid lunge and to secure it with its sharp teeth. Chain pickerel are also known to eat frogs, snakes, worms, mice, other small mammals, crayfish, other small crustaceans, insects, and a wide variety of other foods. It is not unusual for pickerel to leap out of the water at flying insects, or even at dangling fishing lures. Raney (1942) studied chain pickerel in a New York pond and found that golden shiners were found in the stomachs of 47.3% of the 234 chain pickerel examined. Brown bullheads were found in 13.8%, and pumpkinseed sunfish were found in 13.2%. Crayfish of the genus Cambarus were present in 42% of the chain pickerel.

== Reproduction ==
Spawning occurs in flooded vegetation at the end of winter or beginning of spring when the water temperature is between 2–22 °C (36–72 °F). A secondary fall spawning has been reported in Pennsylvania. Fertilization is external and eggs and sperm are mixed by the adults' tail movements. Up to 50,000 eggs may be released by the female. No parental care is provided, and the eggs hatch between six and twelve days after they are laid. The fry possess adhesive glands on their snouts that they use to attach to vegetation. It takes six to eight days for the fry to absorb their yolk sac, at which point they begin to actively hunt.

== Angling ==
The chain pickerel is a popular sport fish. It is an energetic fighter when hooked. Anglers have success with live minnows, spinnerbaits, spoons, topwater lures, plugs, and flies, usually tied with some kind of feather or bucktail material. If the angler intends to release a fish, it is advisable use pliers to flatten the barbs on the lure's hooks. Chain pickerel can swallow an entire lure, so it will be much easier to free a deeply hooked fish and get it back into the water as soon as possible.

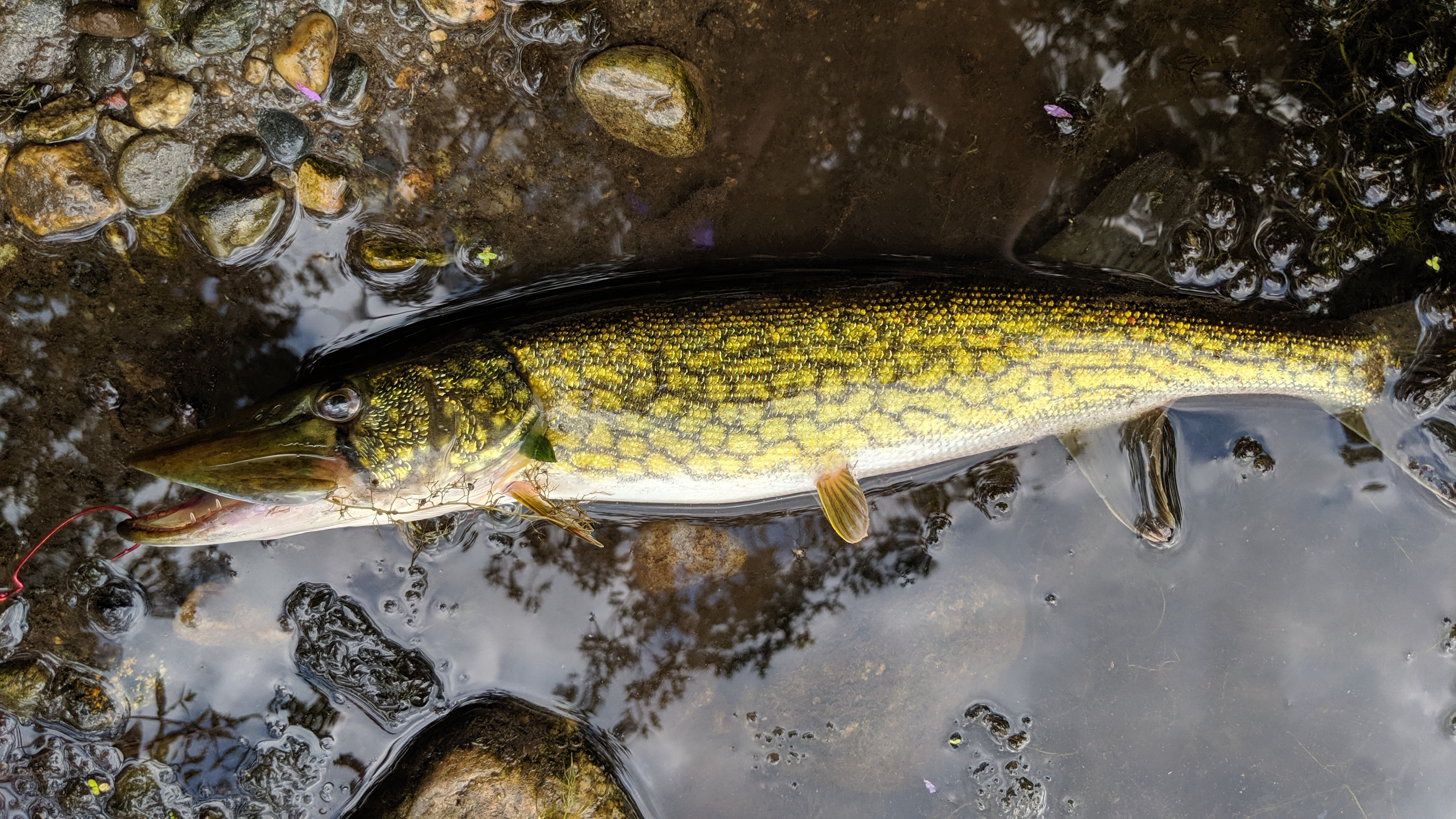
A chain pickerel caught from Dyer Pond in Cranston, Rhode Island

Practically any bass lure can be effective for pickerel, although like most pike, they seem to be particularly susceptible to flashy lures which imitate small forage fish. Dragging a plastic worm, lizard, frog, or other soft imitation can also be extremely effective. A Texas rig method is recommended with these soft baits for productive fishing in the weeds.

A steel leader is necessary for sharp-toothed and active fish at two to three pounds. The angler would also do well to use 12- to 17-lb-test line on an open-faced spinning reel. Methods are similar to those for bass, such as dragging a lure through weeds in shallow water and jerking it side-to-side to give it the look of injured prey. Chain pickerel are voracious and opportunistic feeders, and will attack most any fodder that moves into their range of vision.

The International Game Fish Association (IGFA) all-tackle world record chain pickerel is a 4.25 kg (9.4 lb) fish, caught in Homerville, Georgia on February 17, 1961 by angler Baxley McQuaig, Jr., while the IGFA all-tackle length world record is 65 centimetres (26 in) long, caught in Henderson Harbor, Lake Ontario, New York on November 4, 2019 by angler Burnie Haney.
