= Zara Spook =

Type of fishing lure

Zara Spook 9260 (1939–present) is a topwater type fishing lure. The lure is cast out and retrieved in a "walk the dog" fashion (side to side or zigzag motion). It is supposed to mimic an injured fish and comes in many different fashions but the most prominent is the minnow type. Any fish that takes its prey from the water's surface would be considered a targeted species with this lure.

== History ==
The Zara Spook was first developed by the Heddon company as a wooden lure named the Zaragossa 6500 series lures. In 1939 The plastic version was introduced and following the naming of other plastic lures Heddon added spook to the name to classify it as a plastic lure. The Zara Spook 9260 Series lures contained different types of hardware throughout their production. Heddon two piece hardware were the first hardware on the 1939 catalogued Zara Spook. Later lures through the 1940s and 1950s had surface hardware. Later models contained bell hardware and moulded hangers through the 1970s. In the mid-1990s, a 4-inch long model with three hooks was introduced, and a smaller 2-inch model has also been developed for light tackle fishing. The Zara spook and spin off models are one of a few lures still marketed under the Heddon brand name by EBSCO.
