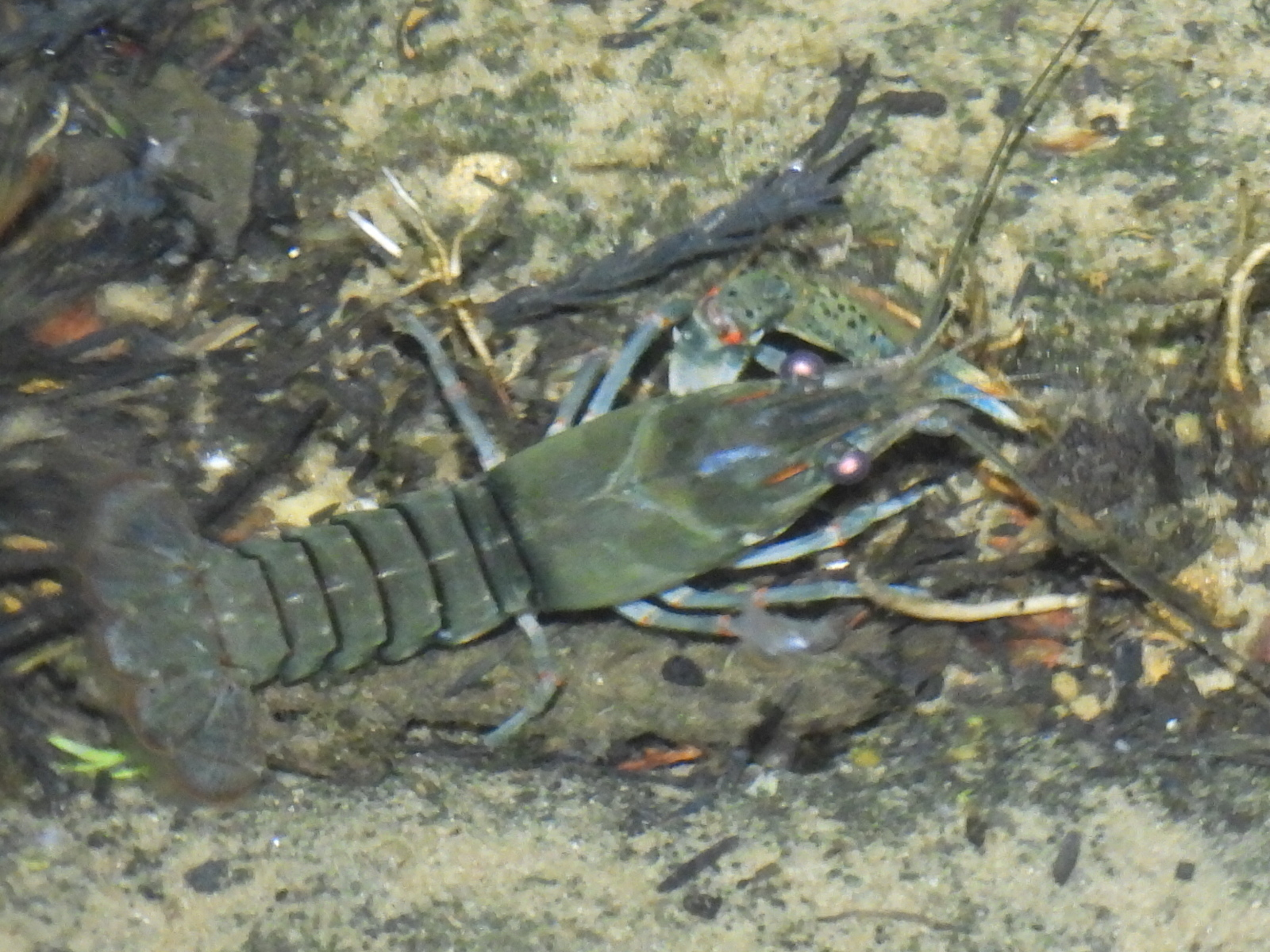

Conservation status
- Data Deficient (IUCN 3.1)

- Imperiled (NatureServe)

Scientific classification
- Kingdom: Animalia
- Phylum: Arthropoda
- Class: Malacostraca
- Order: Decapoda
- Suborder: Pleocyemata
- Family: Cambaridae
- Genus: Faxonius
- Species: F. maletae

Binomial name
- Faxonius maletae (Walls, 1972)

Synonyms
- Orconectes difficilis maletae Walls, 1972; Orconectes maletae

= Faxonius maletae =

Species of crayfish

Faxonius maletae, sometimes called the Kisatchie painted crayfish or Kisatchie painted crawfish, is a species of crawdad in the Cambaridae family. The specific epithet maletae is in honor of the discoverer's wife, author Maleta M. Walls, who helped collect many of the original specimens. It was originally described as a subspecies of Faxonius difficilis, but later elevated to full species status. The common name refers to the Kisatchie National Forest, near where the original specimens were found in Bayou Santabarb.

== Description ==
Kisatchie painted crawfish are brown or olive with red, blue, and white to yellow markings. The red is mainly on the central joints of the pereiopods, the postorbital ridges, and a little on the posterior margins of the uropods (tail fins) and abdominal segments. The fingers of the long, stout chelae (claws) are in order from tip to base, red, yellow/cream, blue, and greenish brown/brown.

Its cephalothorax is about 40 millimetres (1.6 in) long, to a maximum of 4.4 centimetres (1.7 in). The rostrum (beak) is acuminate and has lateral spines. It has a closed areola (the hourglass shaped lines on the back).

It is very similar to Faxonius difficilis but has a central projection that is longer and more curved, with a more smoothly curved expanded mesial process. It can be distinguished from F. palmeri by its shorter gonopods (which may reach the third coxa) and a shorter and stouter central projection. It is fairly indistinguishable from F. hathawayi blacki except that form I (breeding) males have an apex of their first pleopod (swimming leg) that is slender, long, and curved. They only have simple copulatory hooks on their third legs. It is also unique among members of its clade for having a structure like a sulcus caused by a single cephalomedian (anterior) prominence.

== Behaviour ==
Form I males are found in low-water conditions between June and October, peaking in September–October. Males have mating plugs in October. Kisatchie painted crawfish reproduce with the male depositing sperm into an external receptacle under the female's abdomen. She then fertilizes her eggs as she excretes them. Both eggs and hatchlings remain with the mother, held under her body by her pleopods until they are big enough to swim and crawl without assistance. June and July are when juveniles are most commonly found.

== Habitat and ecology ==
F. maletae prefers clear flowing streams with sandy bottoms and plenty of plant litter and rocks. Occasionally it found in reed beds.

It eats carrion and plants.

== Distribution ==
The Kisatchie painted crayfish has a very restricted and fragmented range. It has been found in Rapides, Natchitoches, and Sabine Parishes, Louisiana; Upshur, Titus, Franklin, Gregg, Harrison, and Marion Counties, Texas; Pittsburg and Latimer Counties, Oklahoma; and Washington County, Arkansas. By river, it is found in Bayou Teche, Kisatchie Bayou, tributaries of the Red River of the South, and in Cypress Creek. There is also evidence of it interbreeding with F. difficilis in Coal County, Oklahoma. Some consider the observations in Louisiana to be of F. hathawayi or F. h. blacki and not F. maletae.

Phylogenetic study of the Texas populations indicate they are distinct genetically, perhaps even a separate cryptic species. The populations also inhabited separate ecological niches, which may further drive speciation.

== Threats ==
Kisatchie painted crayfish are susceptible to increased sediment in the water, particularly related to agricultural runoff and logging. The loss of shade from their practices also negatively impacts the animal. Habitat destruction is specifically a concern in Louisiana, where local extinction has happened. With this and the disjointed range of the species, the population is in decline.

In 1996 the species was listed by the IUCN Red List as being vulnerable, but as of 2010 it is listed as data deficient. NatureServe rated the species as G2 (imperiled) in 2009. The American Fisheries Society rated it "Threatened" in 2007.

== Taxonomy ==
F. maletae was formerly in the Hespericambarus subgenus of Orconectes, originally described by Joseph F. Fitzpatrick Jr. The name derives from the Latin hesperius (literally 'western') and cambarus (lit. 'shrimp'). Members of Hespericambarus included:

- Hathawayi group
  - F. perfectus
  - F. hathawayi
  - F. h. blacki
- Difficilis group
  - F. maletae
  - F. difficilis

However, following the re-classification to Faxonius, no subgenera now exist in the new genus as they were considered not to be monophyletic.
