= Plug (fishing) =

Type of fishing lure

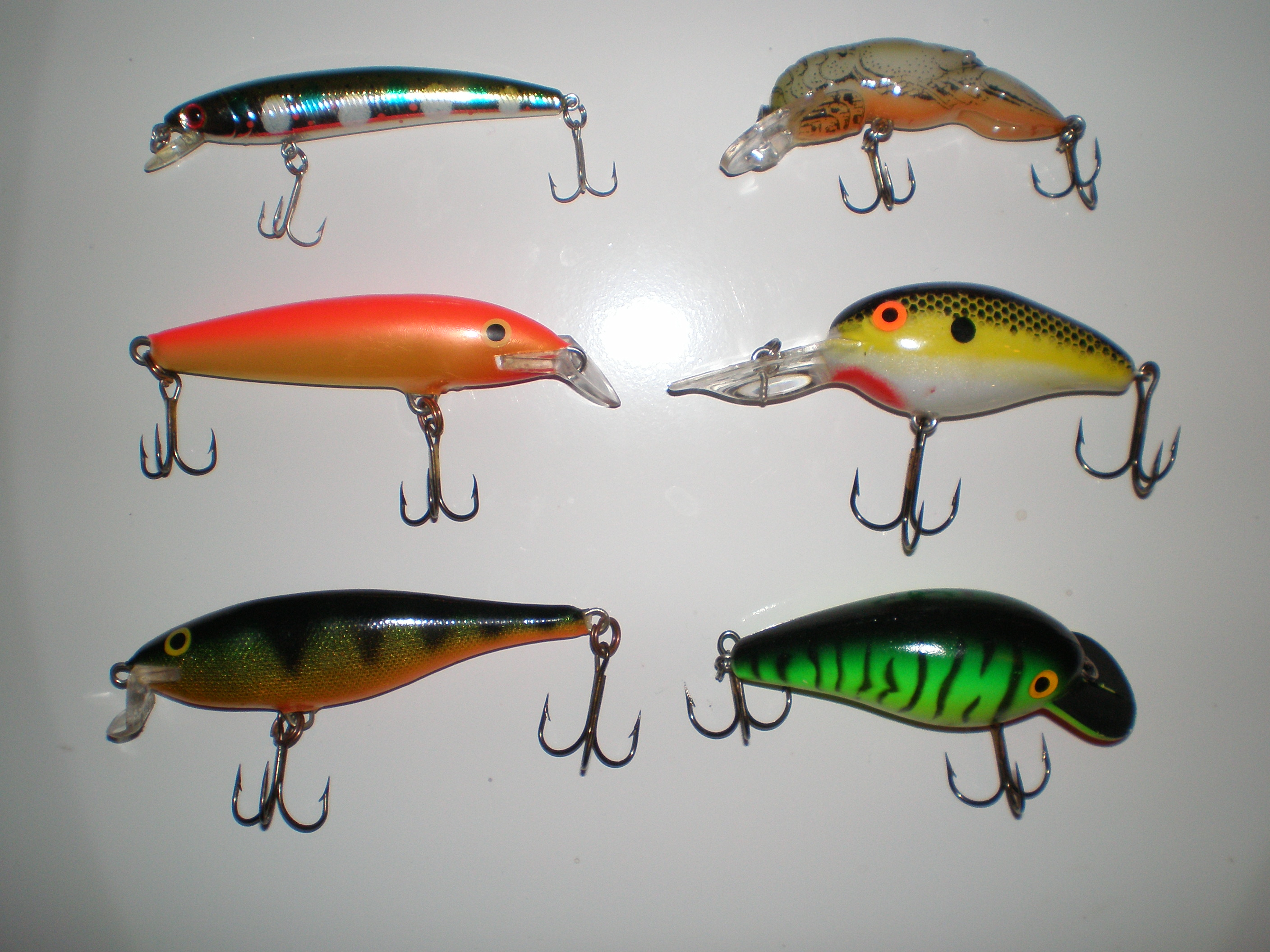
A variety of plug lures

Plugs are a popular type of hard-bodied fishing lure, characterized by a specially designed foil at the front end known as the bill or lip. Plugs are widely known by a number of other names depending on the country and region, including crankbait, wobbler, minnow, shallow-diver and deep-diver. The term minnow is usually used for long, slender, lures that imitate baitfish, while the term plug is usually used for shorter, deeper-bodied lures which imitate deeper-bodied fish, frogs and other prey. Shallow-diver and deep-diver refer to the diving capabilities of the lure, which depends on the size and angle of the lip, and lure buoyancy.

== History ==
The concept of an attractant tied to the end of a line to entice fish goes back to prehistoric peoples, but the modern concept of the plug lure is attributed to James Heddon, a beekeeper from Dowagiac, Michigan, who was whittling a piece of wood one day in the late 19th century while relaxing alongside a millpond. When he rose to leave, he tossed the carved scrap of wood into the pond, and a large bass struck at it as it wobbled down through the water. Intrigued by this, Heddon began experimenting and perfected a design he dubbed the "Lucky 13"—a plug that is still sold today. By the early 20th century, many companies were in the business of designing and selling plug lures.

== Construction ==
The construction of typical plug is:

- A solid or hollow body made out of a lightweight material such as balsa or plastic, sometimes separated into two pieces joined by a small flexible link to enhance the impression of a fish whipping its tail fin.
- A thin sheet metal or plastic lip attached to the front of the body, sometimes adjustable to change the diving ability and wobbling movements of the lure.
- Two, or occasionally three, treble hooks.
- An eyelet for attaching the fishing line.
- Generally, a painted or imprinted color and/or design, to make the plug appear as close as possible to a natural food of the aquatic environment. However, some very effective plugs occasionally have a design or color unlike anything seen in such an environment.

== Action ==
Classic plugs float on the surface or suspend in the water, but will dive under the surface of the water and swim with a side-to-side wobbling movement (hence the alternative name wobbler) upon retrieval, which usually consists of slow to medium fast reel in. This makes the bait seem like a real fish which attracts predatory fish such as bass and pike. Plastic plugs can dive to either a very shallow depth, due to a small lip, or to a moderately deep depth (i.e. several meters), due to a large lip. The angle of the bib also affects diving depth. Sometimes, plugs are named after their diving ability, e.g. "deep-diver" or "shallow-diver". Plugs can also be designed to hover (neutral buoyancy), sink slowly, or sink rapidly. Some have a small metal ball inside to "rattle" when retrieved.

Other lures are sometimes generically called plugs or wobblers. They come in all different shapes and sizes. These plugs are usually made by small companies and cost around twenty dollars. Each plug has its own action or has none unless you give it one. Wood plugs usually range from between 3/4 oz. and 4 oz. The different plugs come in a few basic categories. There are surface swimmers, subsurface swimmers, needlefish, poppers, pencil poppers, and darters. They all have their own specific place and time to be fished.

== Types ==
=== Crankbait ===
A crankbait has a short, stocky body typically with two treble hooks, but also an elongated elliptical bill that often equals or even exceeds the body length. When retrieved, the large bill will cause the lure to pitch down and dive, often accompanied by small, fast side-to-side twitches. The rate and depth of the dive depends on the design of the bill and the specific gravity of the lure's body (usually lighter than water). The name "crankbait" refers to the steady speed of the fisherman's reel cranking during retrieval, which imparts a linear dive on the lure, until the reeling stops (which causes the lure to float up).

Crankbaits can be further classified into shallow-diving (or floating) crankbaits, which maintains a shallow depth (a few feet below the water surface) when reeled, and floats to the top if reeling stops; suspending crankbaits, which dive when reeled but will stay at a specific depth when reeling stops; and deep-diving (or sinking) crankbaits, which sink when not being reeled but stay at a consistent depth when reeled.

=== Jerkbait ===
A jerkbait in north american english or "minnow" has a swimbait-like slender body that resembles a small bait fish (e.g. a shad), a short steeply angled bill, and usually two (or sometimes three) treble hooks. The fisherman flicks the rod and line during retrieval, the sudden brief acceleration causes the nose of the lure to easily decelerate, roll and yaw, thus imparting a stop-and-go, random "darting" motion ("jerks") that resembles the spasmodic struggle of an injured or dying fish.

=== Wobbler ===
A wobbler resembles a crankbait, but has a much shorter and stockier bill that is not designed to impart diving motion, but rather to cause the lure to roll and yaw reciprocally to create a "wobbly" motion when reeled.

== Size ==
Plugs range in size from around an inch (~3 cm) to around 8 inches (~20 cm). Plugs in the 2–3 inch (~5–7 cm) size range are most commonly used however. As a general rule large plugs are used for large fish, and small plugs for small fish. Fishermen casting for very small fish such as crappie will use very small plugs, and anglers fishing for large fish such muskellunge or Murray cod will use extremely large plugs. But trophy-sized fish are occasionally caught on very small plugs, and fingerling perch will sometimes strike—and hook themselves—on a plug as big as they are themselves. Plug fishing is more common in freshwater fishing than saltwater fishing.

== Fishing technique ==
Most plugs have their "action" built into them by design, but good fishermen give nuance to the plug's action in many ways, such as varying the speed of the retrieve, occasionally "twitching" the rod tip during retrieval, or even letting the plug stop completely in the water, then resuming retrieval at a very high speed. Plugs are often cast so they land next to places where fish may be hiding, such as a snag pile or an overhanging tree and worked back enticingly. A skilled fisherman can methodically explore many possible hiding places of fish by continually casting and retrieving a plug.

Theoretically, any plug design will catch fish (most anglers use them to catch bass)—fish will, out of anger, hunger, territorial protection or simple curiosity, occasionally strike at any small object moving or falling through the water. But some plugs have become famous for their high degree of effectiveness, while others come and go from the market quickly when found to have limited success.

== See also ==
- Swimbait
- Jig
- Spoon lure
- Plastic worm
