= Faxonius difficilis =

Conservation status
- Least Concern (IUCN 3.1)

- Vulnerable (NatureServe)

Scientific classification
- Kingdom: Animalia
- Phylum: Arthropoda
- Class: Malacostraca
- Order: Decapoda
- Suborder: Pleocyemata
- Family: Cambaridae
- Genus: Faxonius
- Species: F. difficilis

Binomial name
- Faxonius difficilis (Faxon, 1898)

Synonyms
- Orconectes difficilis

Species of crayfish

Faxonius difficilis, the painted crayfish, is a species of crayfish in the family Cambaridae. It is endemic to Oklahoma and Alabama in the United States.

This species used to be a species complex of four subspecies but these have now been redefined. These were:

- F. difficilis difficilis, the nominate subspecies
- F. d. maletae
- F. d. hathawayi
- F. d. blacki
