= Heddon (brand) =

Brand of fishing lures

Heddon is a brand of artificial fishing lures created by James Heddon, (originally a beekeeper) who is credited with the invention of the first artificial fishing lures made of wood in the late 1890s.

The Heddon Company was founded in 1902 to sell the lures, originally made by hand in the Heddon family kitchen in Dowagiac, Michigan. By 1904 they had a sales distributor in Canada and a new factory in Dowagiac. By 1950 the Heddon brand name was well known. In their growth years, the company also made rods, reels and other peripheral fishing gear.

Citing increased competition and wanting to quit during a profitable time, the Heddon family sold their business to the Murchinson family in 1955. Since then the company has been sold multiple times, finally ending up as part of EBSCO Industries. Many of the company's original lures are still made by EBSCO under their original names, though the list below shows the original run of the named lures in the company's catalog. Many of these lures have been resurrected by later owners, and are still made, such as the "Lucky 13", the "Zara Spook", the "Meadow Mouse" and the "River Runt" all of which remain popular with fisherman more than a century after their introduction. Many Heddon lures were copied by other firms, often with some subtle changes to avoid legal conflict.

== History ==
- 1898 – The original fishing lures were frogs carved from broomsticks by James Heddon. He came upon the idea when he threw a stick he had whittled into a local lake known as the Mill Pond, and watched as a bass hit it.
- 1902 – The first manufactured fishing lures were created by James and his son Will (also, W.T.). Will moved to Florida to test and develop new plugs, as the wooden lures became known.
- 1932 – The first plastic fishing lures were introduced. They gained the name "Spook" because of their transparent color appearance. These early lures were susceptible to decay from poor early plastic mixtures. Few examples remain, and the examples that have survived usually are distorted by bubbling. Because of their scarcity, they are premium-priced collector's items today.

== Models and series of lures ==
All models and series from Old Fishing Lures and Tackle 6th Ed. (Luckey, Carl F. 249-314)

- 1898 – Heddon Frog (end unknown)
- 1902 – Slopenose Dowagiac Expert (ended 1912)
- 1904 – Dowagiac Underwater Expert (ended 1904), Sea Runt 610 (ended 1939)
- 1905 – Dowagiac Minnow 100 (ended 1939), Killer 400 and Killer 450 (ended 1906), Surface Minnow 300 (ended 1929)
- 1907 – Artistic Minnow 50 (ended 1909)
- 1908 – Night-Radiant Moonlight Bait (ended 1911), Surface Minnow 402 (ended 1909)
- 1909 – Baby Dowagiac 20 (first run ended 1909, second run from 1920-1929), Multiple Metal Minnow 500 (ended 1909), Musky Minnow 5 Hook 700 (ended 1910)
- 1910 – Woodpecker 1001 (ended 1913)
- 1911 – Swimming Minnow 800 (ended 1911)
- 1912 – Dowagiac Minnow "0" and Dowagiac Minnow '00' (ended 1927), Light Casting Minnow 10 (ended 1926)
- 1913 – Black Sucker 1300 and Ice Decoy 400 (ended 1927), Coast Minnow (ended 1926), Dummy Double 1500 (ended 1916)
- 1915 – Deep Diving Wiggler 1600 and Near Surface Wiggler 1700 (ended 1926), Crab Wiggler 1800 (ended 1929)
- 1916 – Baby Crab Wiggler 1900 (ended 1939)
- 1918 – Spin Diver 3000 (ended 1926)
- 1920 – Midget Crab Wiggler 1950 (ended 1939)
- 1921 – Florida Special 10B and Florida Special 10S (ended 1923)
- 1922 – Zaragosa 6500 (ended 1952)
- 1923 – Walton Feather Tail 40 (ended 1926)
- 1924 – Salt Water Special 500 and Salt Water Special 600 (ended 1939)
- 1925 – Torpedo 120 (ended 1929), Torpedo 130 (ended 1939)
- 1926 – Salt Water Special 800 (ended 1939), Surface Minnow 260 (ended 1926)
- 1927 – Flipper 140 (ended 1929)
- 1929 – Dowagiac Minnow 150 (ended 1954), River Runt 110 (ended 1939), MEADOW MOUSE 4000 (ended UNKNOWN)
- 1933 – River-Runt Spook
- 1934 – Musky Surfacer 350 (ended 1936)
- 1937 – SOS 140 (ended 1939)
- 1939 – Laguna Runt 10 (ended 1949), Zara Spook 9260 (ended 1978)
- Unknown – Salt Water Special 900 (end unknown)
