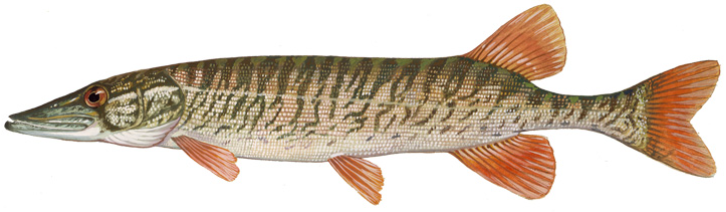
- Redfin pickerel, E. americanus americanus
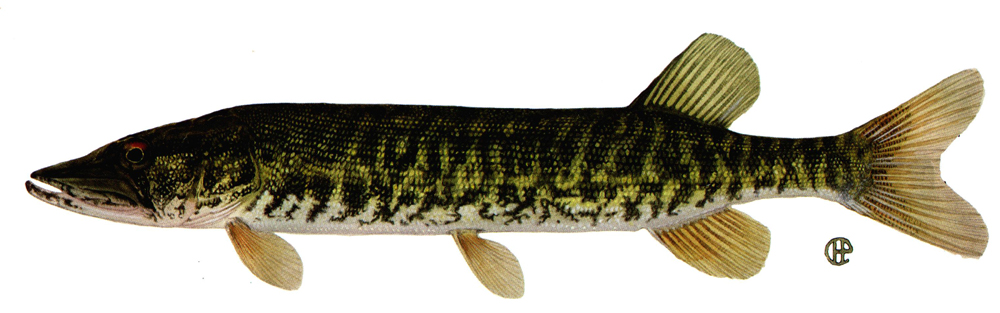
- Grass pickerel, Esox americanus vermiculatus

Conservation status
- Least Concern (IUCN 3.1)

Scientific classification
- Kingdom: Animalia
- Phylum: Chordata
- Class: Actinopterygii
- Order: Salmoniformes
- Family: Esocidae
- Genus: Esox
- Species: E. americanus

Binomial name
- Esox americanus J. F. Gmelin, 1789

Subspecies
- Esox americanus americanus J. F. Gmelin, 1789; Esox americanus vermiculatus Lesueur, 1846

= American pickerel =

Redfin and grass pickerels

Species of fish

The American pickerel (Esox americanus) is a medium-sized species of North American freshwater predatory fish belonging to the pike family. The genus Esox is placed in the family Esocidae (in the order Esociformes).

Two subspecies are sometimes recognised:

- Redfin pickerel, sometimes called the brook pickerel, E. americanus americanus Gmelin, 1789;
- Grass pickerel, E. americanus vermiculatus Lesueur, 1846.

Lesueur originally classified the grass pickerel as E. vermiculatus, but it is now considered a subspecies of E. americanus.

There is no widely accepted English common collective name for the two E. americanus subspecies; "American pickerel" is a translation of the French systematic name brochet d'Amérique.

== Description ==
The two subspecies are very similar, but the grass pickerel lacks the redfin's distinctive orange to red fin coloration. The former's fins have dark leading edges and amber to dusky coloration. In addition, the light areas between the dark bands are generally wider on the grass pickerel and narrower on the redfin pickerel. Record size grass and redfin pickerels can weigh around 2 pounds (0.91 kg) and reach lengths of around 13 inches (33 cm). Redfin and grass pickerels are typically smaller than chain pickerels, which can be much larger.

== Distribution and habitats ==
The redfin and grass pickerels occur primarily in sluggish, vegetated waters of pools, lakes and wetlands, and are carnivorous predators feeding on smaller fish. However, larger fishes, such as the striped bass (Morone saxatilis), bowfin (Amia calva) and gray weakfish (Cynoscion regalis), prey on the pickerels in turn when the latter venture into larger rivers or estuaries.

The pickerels reproduce by scattering spherical, sticky eggs in shallow, heavily vegetated waters. The eggs hatch in 11–15 days; the adult pickerels guard neither the eggs nor the young.

Both subspecies are native to the freshwater bodies of North America, and are not to be confused with their more aggressive big cousin, the northern pike. The redfin pickerel's range extends from the Saint Lawrence basin in Quebec down to the Gulf Coast, from Mississippi to Florida; while the grass pickerel's range is further west, extending from the Great Lakes Basin, from Ontario to Michigan, down to the western Gulf Coast, from eastern Texas to Mississippi.

== Fishing ==
The E. americanus subspecies are not as highly prized as a game fish as their larger cousins, the northern pike and muskellunge, but they are nevertheless caught by anglers. McClane's Standard Fishing Encyclopedia describes ultralight tackle as a sporty if overlooked method to catch these small but voracious pikes.
