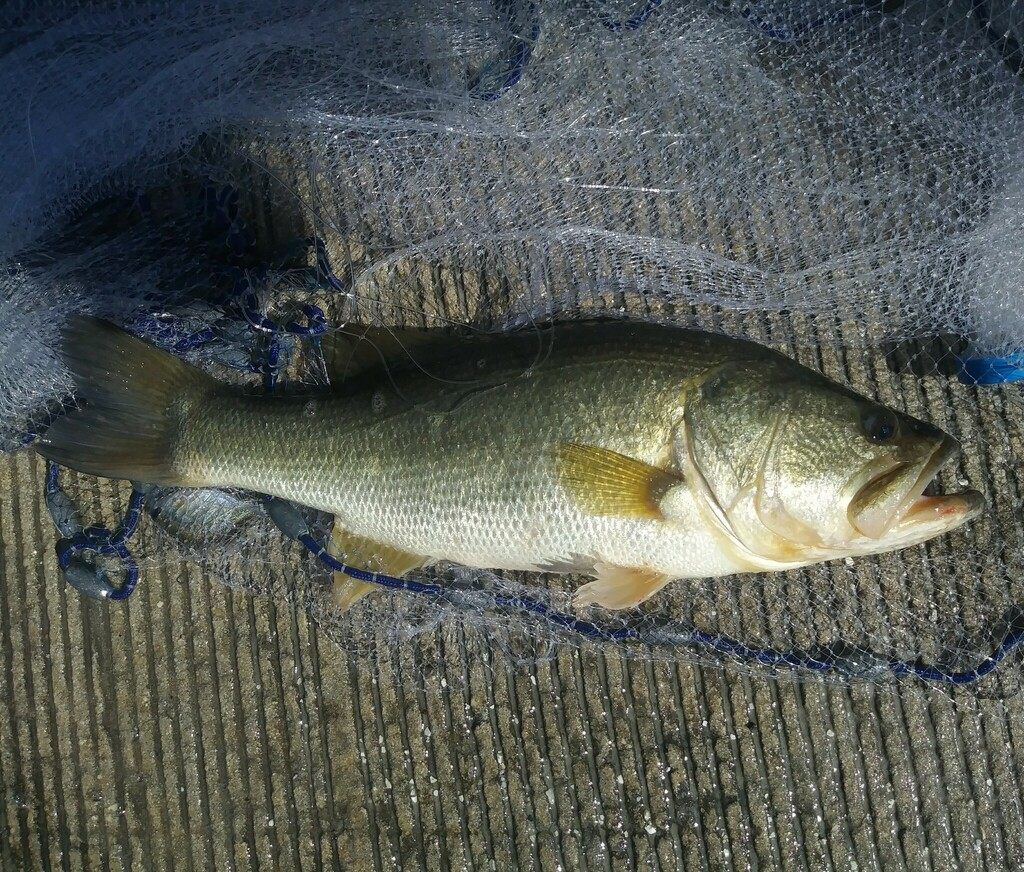

Scientific classification
- Kingdom: Animalia
- Phylum: Chordata
- Class: Actinopterygii
- Division: Teleostei
- Order: Centrarchiformes
- Family: Centrarchidae
- Genus: Micropterus
- Species: M. floridanus

Binomial name
- Micropterus floridanus (Lacépède, 1802)
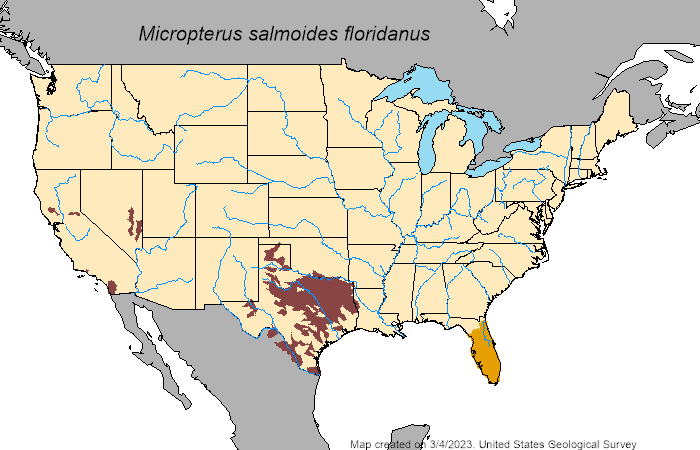
- Distribution map of the Florida bass. Yellow represents native and purple represents where it has been introduced.

Synonyms
- Cichla floridana Lesueur, 1822; Micropterus salmoides floridanus (Lesueur, 1822)

= Florida bass =

Species of fish

The Florida bass (Micropterus floridanus) is a species of freshwater ray-finned fish, a black bass belonging to the sunfish family Centrarchidae of order Centrarchiformes. It is found in the southeastern United States.

== Taxonomy ==
The Florida bass was first formally described in 1822 as Cichla floridana by the French naturalist Charles Alexandre Lesueur with the type locality given as Eastern Florida. It was considered to be conspecific with the largemouth bass (M. nigricans), albeit as a subspecies; however, more recently it has been treated as a valid species. A 2022 phylogenomic study supported its status as a valid species but found that it was more widespread than previously thought. In fact the type locality of M. salmoides was found to be within the range of M. floridanus and this means that the species described as M. salmoides by Bernard Germain de Lacépède in 1802 was the Florida bass and not the largemouth bass. If this is the case then the correct binomial for the Florida bass is M. salmoides with M. floridanus as a junior synonym. The largemouth bass is renamed M. nigricans (Cuvier, 1822), which has a type locality of Lake Huron which is within the range of the largemouth bass.

== Description ==
The Florida bass resembles the largemouth bass in that it has an elongate body that varies in color from a silvery-white to brassy-green and sometimes to a pale brown in murkier waters. The coloration forms a camouflaged pattern as there is a mottling of dark olive mottling along the upper body and a wide black stripe that is normally split into a line of blotches and greenish-black spots along the flank. The caudal fin has a sooty black margin which is more obvious in juveniles. The mouth is large, the upper jaw extends to the rear beyond the eye in adults and there are no teeth on the tongue. There are between 9 and 11 spines in the dorsal fin and 3 spines in the anal fin. The Florida bass is slightly larger, with a length of up to 97 cm (38 in), than the more northerly largemouth bass and differs in some scale counts.

== Distribution and habitat ==
The Florida bass was thought to be restricted to Florida but a phylogenomic study found that it was widespread in coastal river systems of the southeastern United States from Florida north to the Cape Fear River in North Carolina. The Florida bass has been introduced to Nevada, alongside the largemouth bass, and into the range of the largemouth bass. Where the species mix the introgression of Florida bass genes can be very quick. Like the largemouth bass, Florida bass, can be found in a wide variety of waterbodies, it occurs in large lakes, rivers, and reservoirs, to smaller waterbodies such as swamps, ponds, and creek pools. Although this species may prosper in many aquatic environments, it tends to be most numerous in warm, densely vegetated eutrophic lakes, rivers and reservoirs. They are commonly found along shallow shorelines, but more frequently found around logs, rocks and beds of aquatic plants.
