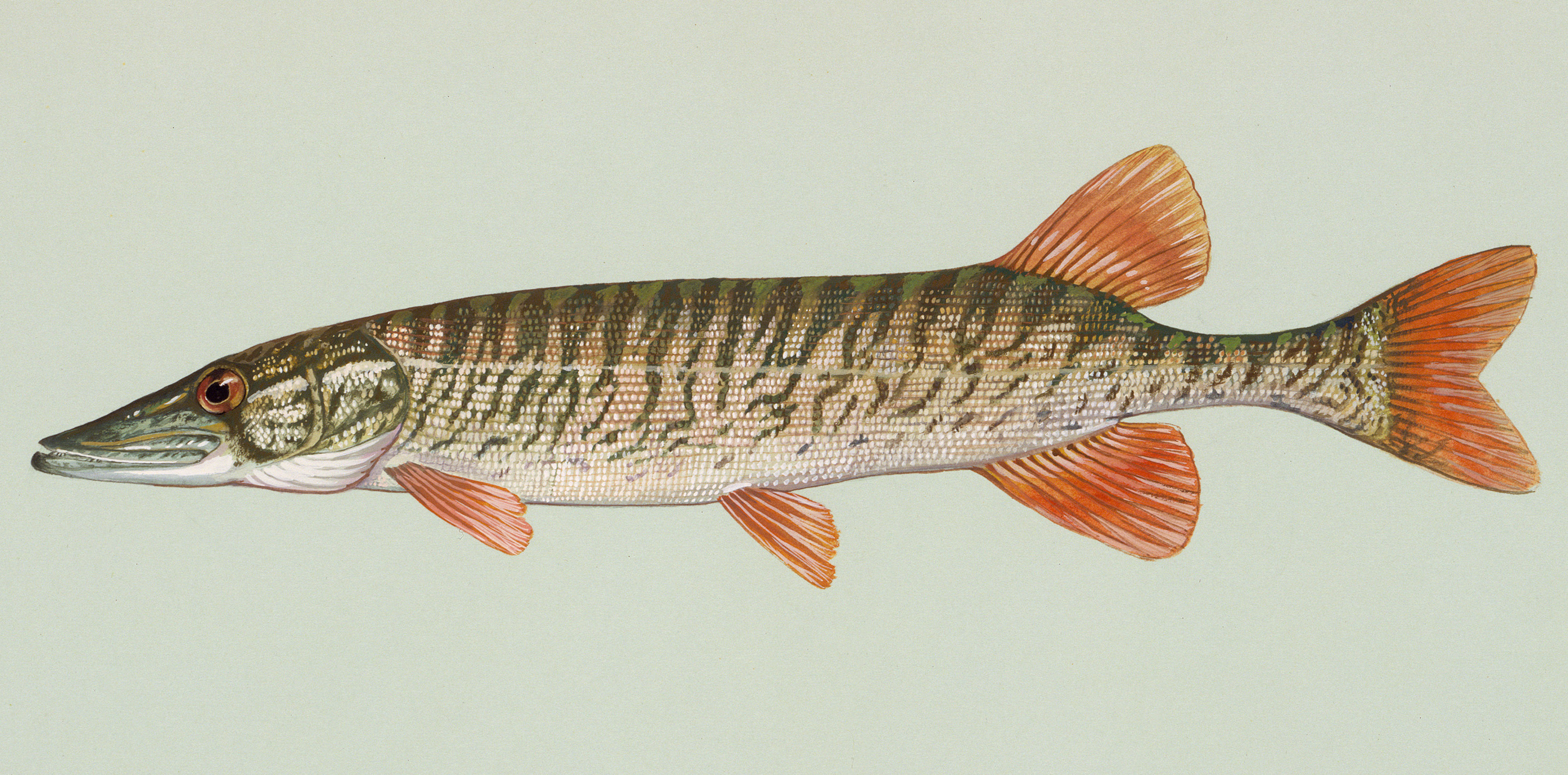

Conservation status
- Secure (NatureServe)

Scientific classification
- Kingdom: Animalia
- Phylum: Chordata
- Class: Actinopterygii
- Division: Teleostei
- Order: Salmoniformes
- Family: Esocidae
- Genus: Esox
- Species: E. americanus
- Subspecies: E. a. americanus

Trinomial name
- Esox americanus americanus J. F. Gmelin, 1789

= Redfin pickerel =

Subspecies of fish

The redfin pickerel (Esox americanus americanus) is a subspecies of freshwater fish belonging to the pike family (Esocidae) of the order Esociformes. Not to be confused with its close relatives, the grass pickerel and the chain pickerel, this fish is unique in the fact that it has brightly colored red fins. Like all pikes, the redfin pickerel is an ambush predator, lying amongst thick vegetation in wait for smaller, more agile prey to enter within its range of attack.

== Distribution and habitat ==
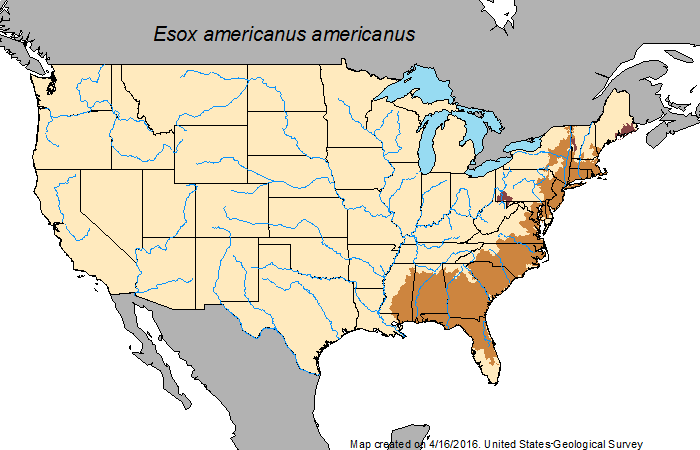
Map of the North American distribution of Esox americanus americanus

The redfin pickerel can be found in freshwater lakes, streams, and swamps along the Atlantic slope. Stable populations extend from Massachusetts to Florida's Okeechobee Lake, and west into Gulf drainages up to Mississippi's Pascagoula River. In some parts of its range, notably toward the western extent, it overlaps with its sister species, the grass pickerel, Esox americanus vermiculatus. Because the redfin pickerel is an ambush predator, the fish prefers freshwater habitats with high visibility and dense vegetation or decaying organic matter in which to hide itself.

== Physiology ==
The redfin pickerel, like other fish of the Esox genus, is well adapted to sprint predation. The posterior positioning of the unpaired fins is testament to this, the dorsal fin lining up with the anal fin, and the ventral more rearward than would be found on other fish body types. The pectorals are shrunken to streamline the fish, while the caudal fin is rather large so as to provide considerable thrust. Further adaptations correlating with their rushing style is a hydrodynamic tube shaped body, a flat nose, and an unadorned head.

The redfin pickerel relies heavily on vision to locate prey, as indicated by their large eyes and propensity for clear, shallow water. The scale coloration of the fish typically ranges from green to brown on the lateral portion, while the ventral side ranges from white to a pale amber. Vertical streaks of dark green line the lateral sides of these fish. This coloration is vital for hunting, as it allows the pickerel to camouflage within the vegetation as it waits for prey to approach.

The mouth of the fish is located at the terminal position anterior of the snout and is lined with a series of long, conical teeth that can be used to capture fast moving prey. Unlike its larger northern relatives, the redfin pickerel grows to around twelve inches in length.

== Life cycle ==
Spawning typically occurs in the spring, spanning from late February to early May, with fish in warmer waters breeding earlier in the year than those that live in colder waters. In order to breed, these solitary fish will leave the rivers and lakes they live in to meet others of their kind in small streams that range from 4 °C (39 °F) to 18.3 °C (64.9 °F). The redfin pickerel engages in a polyandrous style of mating, in which one female scatters her eggs among the vegetation while multiple males will release their milt in the water surrounding it. The parents abandon the area soon after, leaving their young to fend for themselves.

After hatching within a range of roughly 12 to 14 days, the larval pickerel will school together for protection. Upon reaching sexual maturity after two years, the fish will adopt a solitary lifestyle. They can be expected to live for five years, though some specimens have been documented to survive for eight years.

== Diet ==
The redfin pickerel is an ambush predator, lying in wait for unsuspecting prey animals to get within striking range. The pickerel fills the role of apex predator in its small, shallow, aquatic environment, feeding on smaller fishes, crayfish, and insect larvae. The newly hatched larvae meanwhile will feed on small organisms like water fleas, amphipods and insects.

== Ecological concerns ==
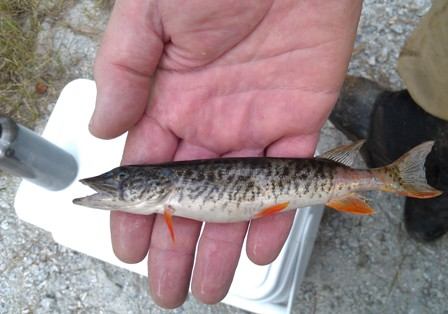
Man holding a captured redfin pickerel.

The redfin pickerel and its sister subspecies, the grass pickerel, sit comfortably in a position of least concern as determined by the International Union for Conservation of Nature (IUCN). Despite this rating, the redfin pickerel is still threatened by rampant environmental degradation. Threats from habitat loss are ever present with the continued drainage of wetlands and the building of dams drying up extraneous streams, but scientist have also noticed a heavy threat of biomagnification of metals in the species and in the surrounding community.

The redfin pickerel is the top predator of its area, meaning it faces the greatest danger from toxin exposure. As it eats smaller fish and other animals that have been exposed to harmful substances, the chemicals, particularly environmental mercury, build up in the tissues of the pickerel. If the fish is then eaten by a bird or human, the prospect of mercury poisoning could be a serious threat.
