= Spin fishing =

Angling technique where a spinning lure is used to entice the fish to bite

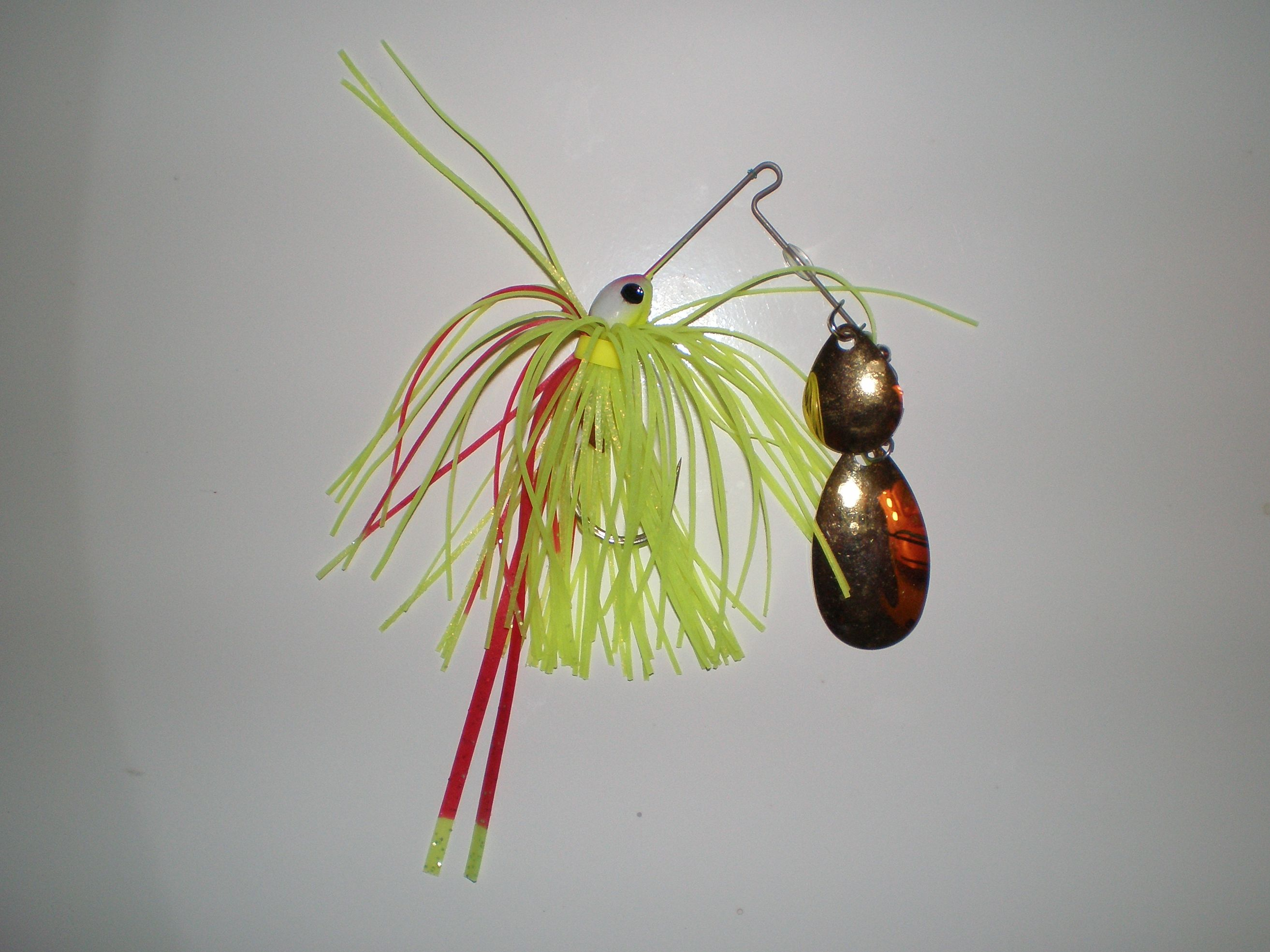
Spinnerbait with dual spinning blades

Spin fishing is an angling technique where a spinnerbait, a type of hybrid fishing lure with at least one freely rotating blade, is used to entice the fish to bite. When the line is reeled back, the spinnerbait blades will spin passively with the oncoming water flow, in turn stirring up a significant amount of turbulence and noise, which transmit through the water and provoke predatory fish to strike the lure out of their foraging as well as territorial instincts. Spin fishing is used in both freshwater and marine environments.

== Techniques ==
When fishing in a river the line should be cast upstream. Casting upstream and retrieving with the current results in the spinner/lure sinking faster.

=== Bottom bouncing ===
Bottom bouncing is a spin fishing technique where the spinner is cast up river from the shore, and then allowed to bounce on the river bottom until it has moved downstream. The rod tip is held higher in the air than normal and the speed of retrieval is faster. This method is commonly used when float fishing from an inflatable dingy. The spinner is cast directly behind the boat until it settles on the bottom. After the spinner has settled it bounces on the bottom, naturally attracting fish of all species. This technique is commonly used for trout in large wide rivers where an inflatable boat can be used. All types of trout are caught with this method including brown trout, rainbow trout, bull trout, brook trout and cutthroat trout.

=== Walking the dog ===
Walking the dog is a spin fishing technique that involves imparting a zigzag motion to a spinner or lure. This action is achieved by creating slack in the line before and after each jerk, allowing for a crisp and natural motion of the lure. The method begins with the rod tip held low over the water, around 1 to 1.5 feet above the surface. The angler can activate the lure either with wrist action or a whole-arm motion that pivots from the shoulder, with alternation between these two methods serving to reduce stress on individual joints.

In this technique, the slack before and after each jerk allows the rod tip to move further than the lure's movement, creating a more natural and unpredictable motion. The angler delivers a non-stop series of rhythmic strokes that jerk the lure by snapping slack line, causing it to zigzag about six inches (15 cm) to alternating sides without pause.

From the fish's perspective, the lure appears as a frightened creature making unnecessary movements. This motion makes it difficult for bass and other species to get a good look at the lure, which is partly responsible for the success of this technique. The lure spends its time scooting back-and-forth with little meaningful forward progress, yet remains hard to identify.

== Target species ==
Most species of fish can be caught by spin fishing; however, some are more susceptible to this technique than others. Common freshwater targets are trout, salmon, perch, chub, bream, pike, walleye, Blue Kurper and bass.

== Types of spinner ==
Lures and spinners are versatile tools, with the idea to imitate prey fish for pike and zander. Lures, spinners, and spoons are the classic categories, but the spinnerbait has the combination of being both spinner and lure. Their effectiveness is governed by weight, color, actions of the lure and the speed of retrieval by the angler.
