= Swimbait =

Fishing lure

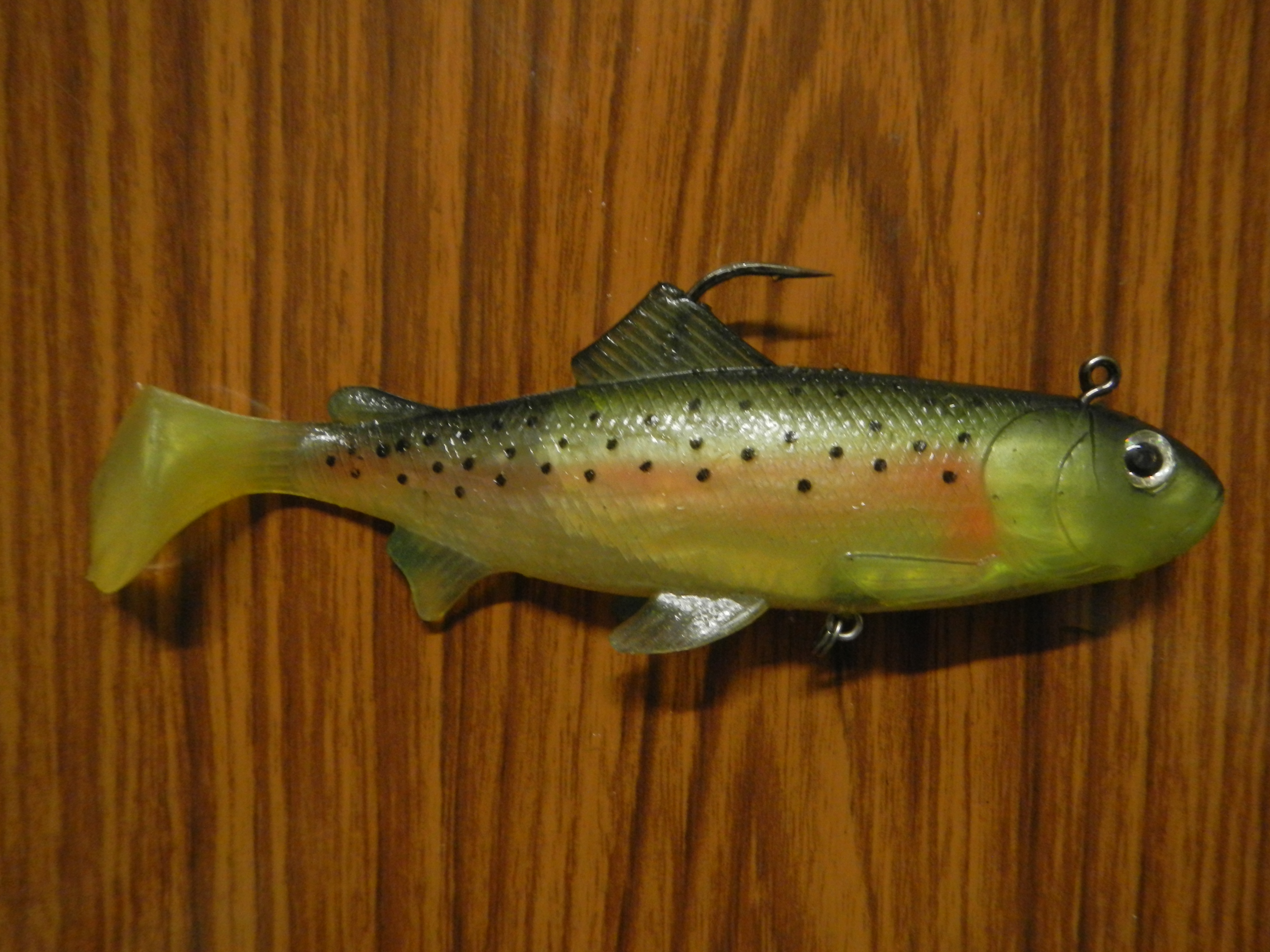
A swimbait designed to imitate a rainbow trout

Swimbaits or swimmers are a loosely defined class of fishing lures that are designed to primarily imitate the underwater swimming motions of baitfishes.

== History ==
Swimbaits originated in the late 1980s as lures designed to imitate rainbow trout in Southern California reservoirs that largemouth bass and striped bass fed on. They were larger and more lifelike imitations than most available mass-produced lures at the time.

== Types ==
Swimbaits are mainly broken down into 2 categories: hard body and soft body swimbaits.

=== Hard-body ===
Hard-body swimbaits are often made of either wood or plastic. These baits are designed to mimic baitfish that predatory fish—such as largemouth bass, smallmouth bass, spotted bass, pike, and trout—would eat.

Hard-body swimbaits are built to produce a swimming action that provokes a predatory instinct, causing fish to strike. The lure's movement depends on the number of joints in its design.

==== Glide Baits (Single-Joint Swimbaits) ====
A single-jointed hard-body swimbait, commonly known as a glide bait, moves with a serpentine or "gliding" action in the water. This bait can be retrieved at different speeds and with various techniques to create erratic movements that mimic injured fish.

==== Multi-Jointed Swimbaits ====
Due to their segmented body design, multi-jointed hard-body swimbaits offer a more natural swimming motion. These baits can also create unique movements based on retrieve styles and speeds.

The versatility of hard-body swimbaits makes them effective in various fishing conditions, from clear open water to heavy cover, depending on how they are retrieved.

=== Soft-body ===
Soft-body swimbaits are almost exclusively made out of rubber or soft plastic, similar to artificial worms. Some soft-body swimbaits are designed to trigger strikes based on movement, while highly detailed baits (usually top-hook) rely more on realism than action.

Soft-body swimbaits have several subcategories, including paddle tails, line-through swimbaits, and top-hook swimbaits.

==== Paddle Tail Swimbait ====
Paddle tail swimbaits are the most common type used by many anglers. These baits come in various sizes:

- Smaller paddle tails are often used as trailers for a spinnerbait, chatterbait, or underspin.
- Larger paddle tails are commonly fished on a swimbait jig head or a weighted extra-wide gap (EWG) hook.

Paddle tail swimbaits come in two styles: - Solid-body paddle tails provide durability and are often paired with jig heads. - Hollow-body paddle tails allow different rigging options and internal weight systems.

==== Line-Through Swimbaits ====
Line-through swimbaits are large swimbaits that allow the fishing line to run through the body. This design helps prevent fish from using the bait as leverage to throw the hook.

==== Top-Hook Swimbaits ====
Top-hook swimbaits have a large, strong, jig-style hook that protrudes from the top of the swimbait. These swimbaits are often used in deep water or rocky environments where bottom-dwelling fish are present.

The top-hook swimbait typically has a wedge-style tail, which is designed for colder water conditions, providing a more subtle swimming action.

== Gallery ==
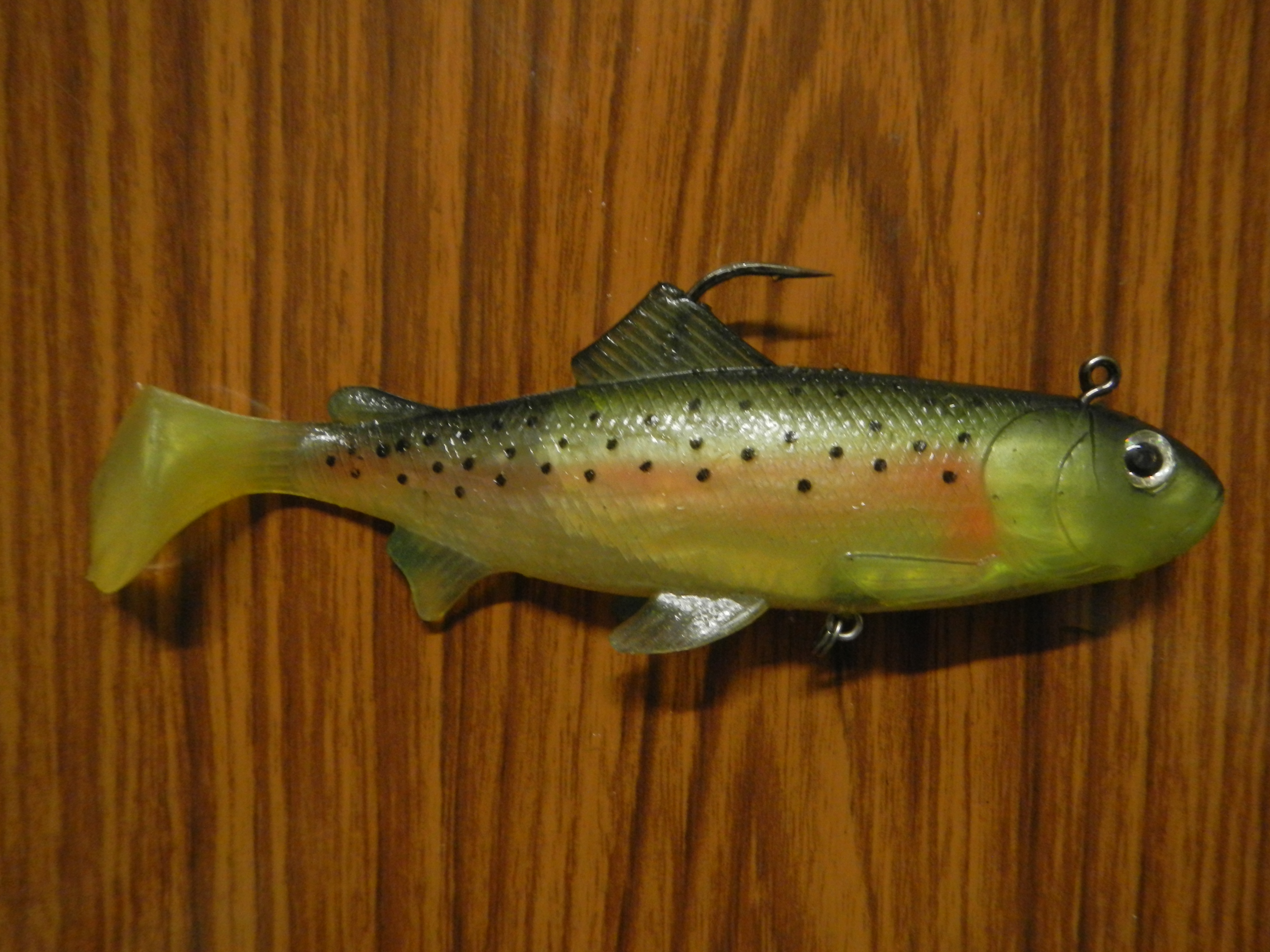
A swimbait designed to imitate a rainbow trout.

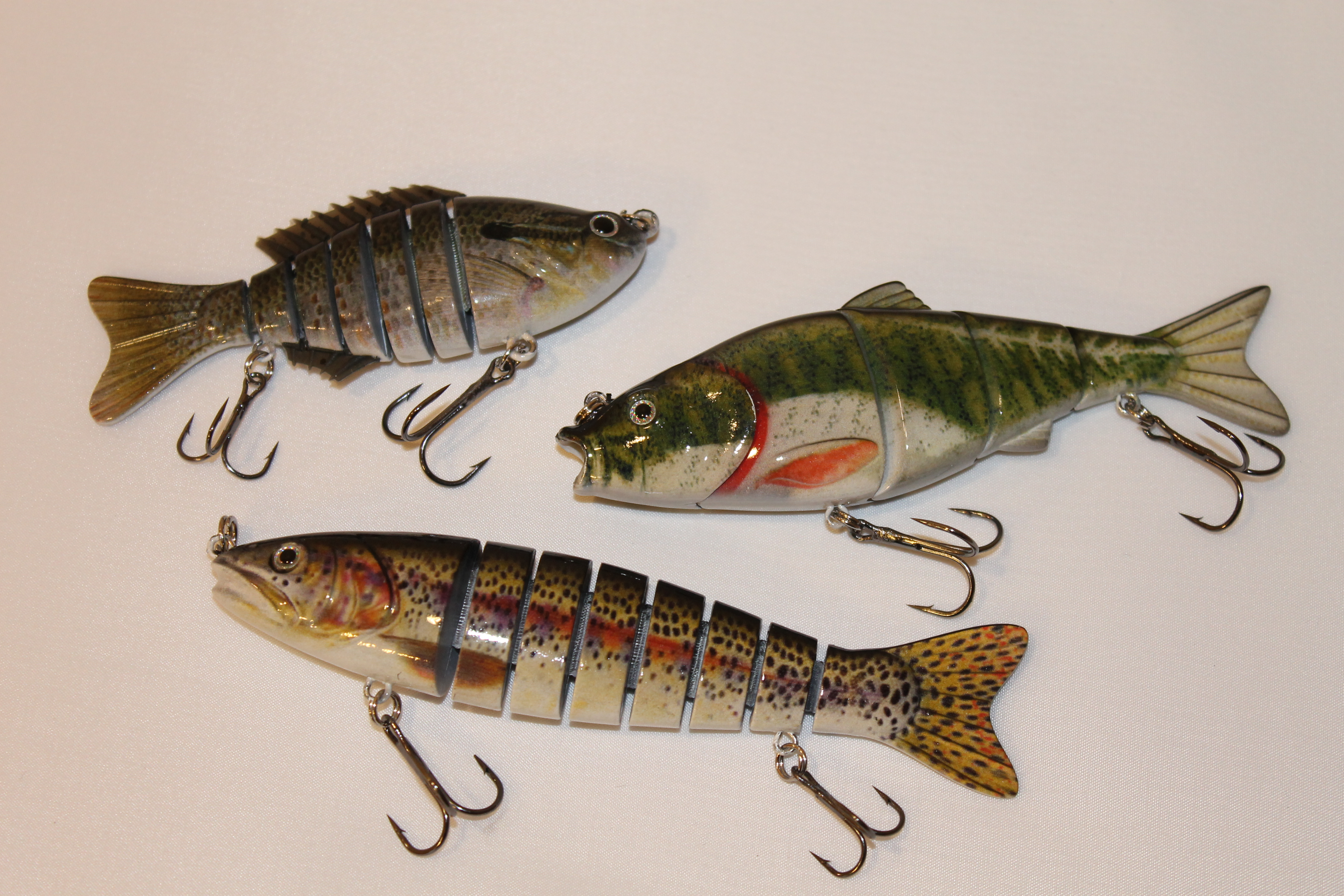
Various swimbaits from Kanan Fishing Lures.

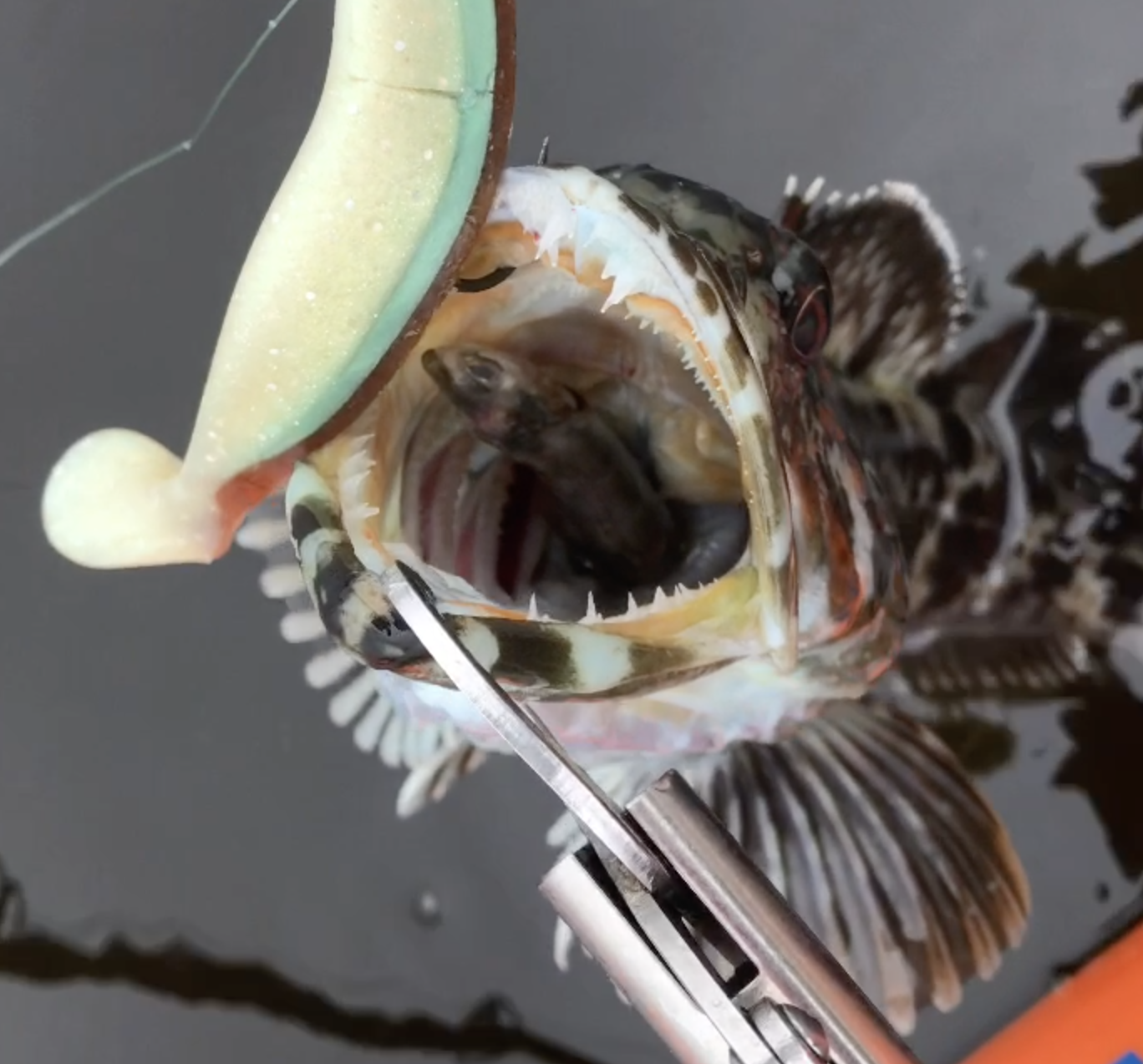
A Lingcod caught with a swimbait.
