= Plastic worm =

Plastic fishing lure

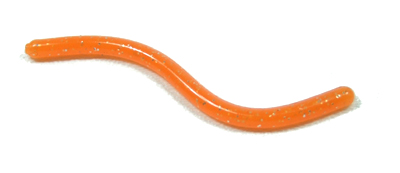
Orange plastic worm.

A plastic worm or trout worm is a soft-bodied fishing lure made of elastomer polymer material, generally simulating an earthworm. Plastic worms are typically impaled onto a hook, and can carry a variety of shapes, colors and sizes, and some are even scented to simulate live bait.

Plastic worms can be rigged on the line many different ways. Commonly they are used with a small fish hook and a split shot weight to keep the lure deeper in the water. The fishing equipment recommended is a 7-foot fishing rod with 8 to 10 lb (3.6 to 4.5 kg) fishing line. A common fishing strategy is to configure them as a Texas Rig, and bounce them off the bottom. The key is to jig near or in cover such as weeds and trees, this technique is commonly referred to as flipping and pitching.

Although sometimes called a "trout worm,” this type of lure is often unreliable for trout fishing, and therefore many trout anglers do not use them. Black bass and panfish species (bluegill, redear sunfish, etc.) tend to bite these lures more than other species.

== Twister worm ==
A typical twister worm or twister tail.

"Twister Worm" is commonly called a grub, not a "twister worm", even though the action of the tail is defined as a twisting motion of the body resembling that of a grub.

== See also ==
- Fishing
- Crappie
- Trout
- Black bass
- Texas rig
