= Faxonius hathawayi blacki =

Conservation status
- Vulnerable (IUCN 3.1)

- Imperiled (NatureServe)

Scientific classification
- Kingdom: Animalia
- Phylum: Arthropoda
- Class: Malacostraca
- Order: Decapoda
- Suborder: Pleocyemata
- Family: Cambaridae
- Genus: Faxonius
- Species: F. hathawayi
- Subspecies: F. h. blacki

Trinomial name
- Faxonius hathawayi blacki (Walls, 1972)

Synonyms
- Orconectes blacki; Orconectes hathawayi blackii

Subspecies of crayfish

Faxonius hathawayi blacki, the Calcasieu crayfish, is a sub-species of crayfish in the family Cambaridae. It is endemic to Louisiana. The common name refers to the Calcasieu River, near where the original specimens were found in Beauregard Parish, Louisiana.
