= Topwater fishing lure =

Type of fishing lure

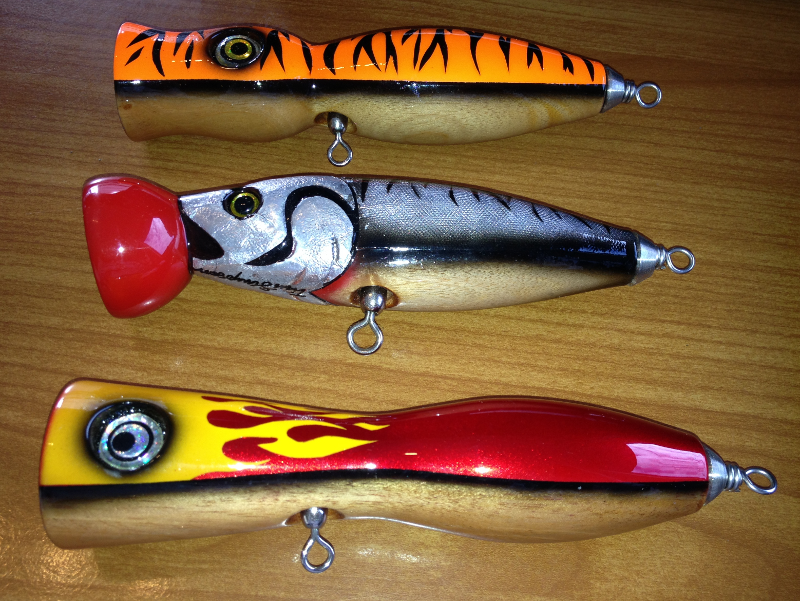
Robert Stone Mahogany Lures (GT Poppers)

A topwater fishing lure or walker is a type of surface fishing lure, usually floating just at the water surface, that may be moved about the surface of water in order to attract and cause fish to attempt to strike the lure. Non-floating versions may be retrieved at sufficient speed to cause them to travel at the water's surface.

Such lures are often designed to resemble smaller creatures that would normally be considered as food for the target game fish species. They are painted to look like the prey of the target species; usually smaller baitfish, frogs or insects. One of the key features of the topwater lure is the serpentine "walking" action that it imparts as it travels along the water's surface. The more effective lures have an action that closely resembles that of the actual living creature. The lure is typically fitted with one of more fish hooks (usually treble hooks) to hook the target fish as it strikes the lure. Variations exist that include internal rattles to generate sound that might be similar to the sounds created by the actual, live creature being emulated. some also include small light sources such as LEDs that might be battery powered. There are also jointed bodies, moving eyes, holographic finishes, etc. all of which are incorporated to encourage the target species to strike the lure. The lure is normally attached to the end of a fishing line that is attached to a fishing rod and reel and is cast into areas where the target species might be found and "worked" skillfully within that area to encourage strikes. This type of fishing is considered by many to be one of the more exciting methods used to catch fish. A frequent mistake when fishing topwater lures is to initiate the hookset immediately upon seeing the fish strike the lure. In many species, especially bass, it is important to wait a few seconds before initiating the hookset to ensure that the lure is in the best position in the fish's mouth to optimize the chances of a successful hooking. Black bass, spotted seatrout, ladyfish, redfish, bluefish, tarpon, bonefish, barracuda, & pickerel are examples of fish that might be taken by the topwater approach.
