= Piney Woods =

Temperate coniferous forests ecoregion of the United States

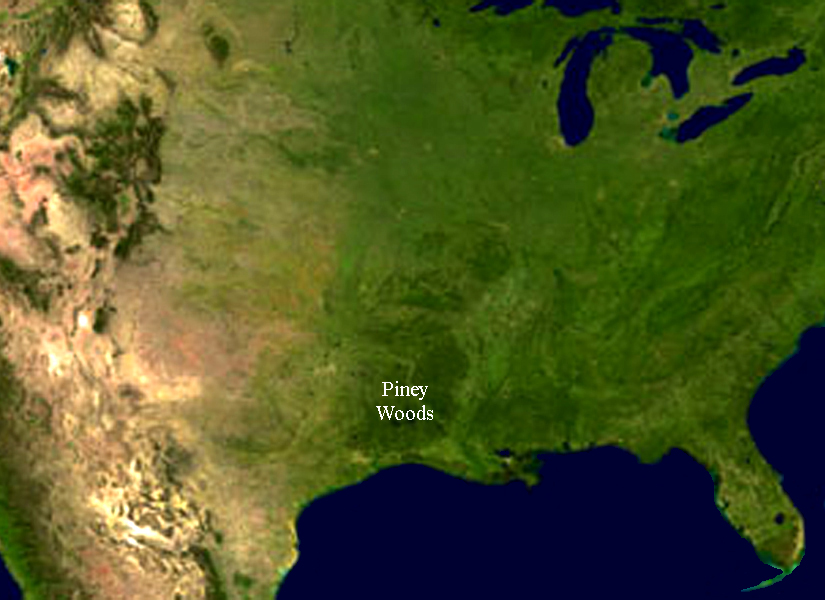
- Satellite image of North America with the Piney Woods eco-region discernible in distinct dark green.
- South Central Plains (EPA ecoregion)

Ecology
- Realm: Nearctic
- Biome: Temperate coniferous forest
- Borders: List: Mississippi lowland forests; Western Gulf coastal grasslands; East Central Texas forests; Texas blackland prairies; Central forest-grasslands transition; Ozark Mountain forests
- Bird species: 205
- Mammal species: 60

Geography
- Area: 140,900 km^{2} (54,400 mi^{2})
- Country: United States
- States: Texas; Arkansas; Louisiana; Oklahoma
- Coordinates: 32°N 94°W
- Climate type: Humid subtropical (Cfa)

Conservation
- Habitat loss: 22.235%
- Protected: 11.03%

The Piney Woods is a temperate coniferous forest terrestrial ecoregion in the Southern United States covering 54,400 square miles (141,000 km^{2}) of East Texas, southern Arkansas, western Louisiana, and southeastern Oklahoma. These coniferous forests are dominated by several species of pine as well as hardwoods including hickory and oak. Historically the most dense part of this forest region was the Big Thicket though the lumber industry dramatically reduced the forest concentration in this area and throughout the Piney Woods during the 19th and 20th centuries. The World Wide Fund for Nature considers the Piney Woods to be one of the critically endangered ecoregions of the United States. The United States Environmental Protection Agency (EPA) defines most of this ecoregion as the South Central Plains. In Arkansas, the region is sometimes called the Arkansas Timberlands.

== Setting ==
The Piney Woods cover a 54,400-square-mile (141,000 km^{2}) area of eastern Texas, northwestern Louisiana, southwestern Arkansas and the southeastern corner of Oklahoma. They are bounded on the east by the Mississippi lowland forests, on the south by the Western Gulf coastal grasslands, on the west by the East Central Texas forests and the Texas blackland prairies, on the northwest by the Central forest-grasslands transition, and on the north by the Ozark Mountain forests. This area receives 40–52 inches (1,000–1,300 mm) of precipitation annually.

== Flora ==
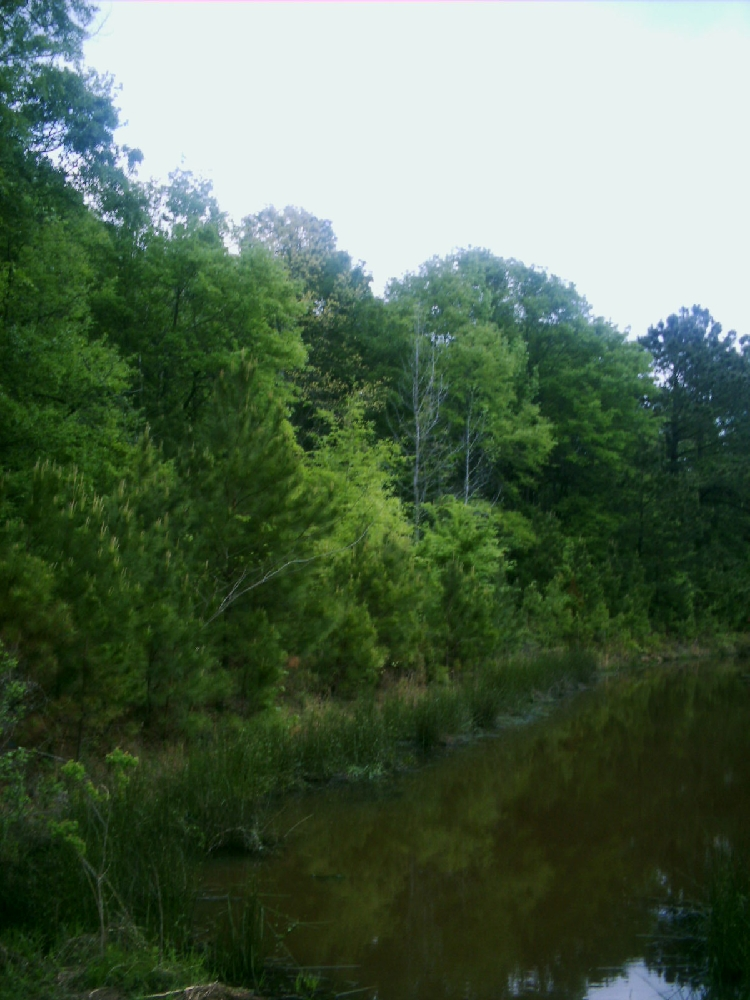
A creek running through the Piney Woods in Northeast Texas.

The region has heavy to moderate rainfall, with some places receiving over 60 in (1,500 mm) of rain per year. Longleaf, shortleaf, and loblolly pines, along with bluejack and post oaks, dominate sandhills. A well-developed understory grows beneath the sparse canopy, and includes yaupon holly and flowering dogwood. Pine savannas consist of scattered longleaf and loblolly pines alongside black tupelos, sweetgums, and in acid soils along creeks sweetbay magnolias. Other common trees in this ecoregion include eastern redbud, river birch, red maple, southern sugar maple, and American elm. American wisteria, a vine, may cover groves of trees.

Two varieties of wetlands are common in the Piney Woods: bayous are generally found near rivers and sloughs are generally found near creeks. In bayous bald cypress, Spanish moss, and water lilies are common plants. Sloughs are shallow pools of standing water that most trees are not capable of growing in. Other species, such as the purple bladderwort, a small carnivorous plant, have found niches in sloughs. A baygall is another type of wetland found the Piney Woods and other forest of the Gulf Coast states in the USA.

Hardy species of prickly pear cactus and yucca can be found in the forests where deep sands occur.

The indigenous Texas trailing phlox (Phlox nivalis texensis), an endangered species, grows in the sandy soils of longleaf pine forests.

== Fauna ==
Mammals: Common species in the Piney Woods include white-tailed deer (Odocoileus virginianus), Virginia opossum (Didelphis virginiana), northern raccoon (Procyon lotor), striped skunk (Mephitis mephitis), eastern mole (Scalopus aquaticus), least shrew (Cryptotis parva), eastern gray squirrel (Sciurus carolinensis), eastern fox squirrel (Sciurus niger), and eastern cottontail (Sylvilagus floridanus). Somewhat less common are the northern river otter (Lontra canadensis), bobcat (Lynx rufus), gray fox (Urocyon cinereoargenteus), southern short-tailed shrew (Blarina carolinensis), North American beaver (Castor canadensis), and swamp rabbit (Sylvilagus aquaticus). Some carnivores such as the eastern spotted skunk (Spilogale putorius), ringtail (Bassariscus astutus), long-tailed weasel (Mustela frenata), American mink (Mustela vison), and red fox (Vulpes vulpes), are uncommon, rarely seen, and in decline. Over a dozen species of bats occur in the region, some migratory like the Brazilian free-tailed bat (Tadarida brasiliensis) and silvered-haired bat (Lasionycteris noctivagans), others are year-round residents like the Seminole bat (Lasiurus seminolus), evening bat (Nycticeius humeralis), Rafinesque's big-eared bat (Corynorhinus rafinesquii), a threatened species in Texas. Rodents found in the Piney Woods include the southern flying squirrel (Glaucomys volans), common muskrat (Ondatra zibethicus), Baird's pocket gopher (Geomys breviceps), woodland vole (Microtus pinetorum), and about 10 additional native rats and mice.

Several of the larger carnivores that once occurred in the Piney Woods are entirely extirpated, including the hog-nosed skunk (Conepatus leuconotus), red wolf (Canis rufus), jaguar (Panthera onca), and ocelot (Leopardus pardalis). The mountain lion (Puma concolor) and black bear (Ursus americanus) have also been extirpated from most areas; however, very rare sightings or remains are occasionally documented, likely representing wandering individuals rather than breeding populations. Stable populations of black bears occur in adjacent areas north and east of the Piney Woods and they appear to be slowly increasing in numbers and dispersing. As of 2020, however, the black bear is largely extirpated from most quarters, and rare in peripheral areas. With the clearing of forest and decline of the native predators (or competitors), the nine-banded armadillo (Dasypus novemcinctus), coyotes (Canis latrans), and black-tailed jackrabbit (Lepus californicus) have expanded their ranges eastward into the region. Other species have been introduced into the region such as the nutria or coypu (Myocastor coypus), house mouse (Mus musculus), roof rat (Rattus rattus), and Norway rat (Rattus norvegicus). Feral house cats (Felis catus) and feral pigs (Sus scrofa) pose threats to native fauna and are serious conservation concerns.

Birds: With some species migrating through in the spring and fall, others nesting in the spring and summer months, and still others wintering in the region, well over 300 species of birds occur in the Piney Woods. A few of the many year round residents include the wood duck (Aix sponsa), black vulture (Coragyps atratus), red-shouldered hawk (Buteo lineatus), American kestrel (Falco sparverius), wild turkey (Meleagris gallopavo), northern bobwhite (Colinus virginianus), American woodcock (Scolopax minor), greater roadrunner (Geococcyx californianus), red-cockaded woodpecker (Picoides borealis), loggerhead shrike (Lanius ludovicianus), northern mockingbird (Mimus polyglottos), brown thrasher (Toxostoma rufum), Carolina chickadee (Poecile carolinensis), brown-headed nuthatch (Sitta pusilla), pine warbler (Dendroica pinus), Bachman's sparrow (Aimophila aestivalis), and fish crow (Corvus ossifragus). Many additional species migrate from regions south and nest in the Piney Woods in the spring and summer, such as the anhinga (Anhinga anhinga), yellow-crowned night-heron (Nyctanassa violacea), little blue heron (Egretta caerulea), snowy egret (Egretta thula), purple gallinule (Porphyrula martinica), Chuck-will's-widow (Caprimulgus carolinensis), scissor-tailed flycatcher (Tyrannus forficatus), prairie warbler (Dendroica discolor), Swainson's warbler (Limnothlypis swainsonii), and painted bunting (Passerina ciris). Conversely, a different assemblage of birds migrate from the north to spend the winters months in the region, including the Canada goose (Branta canadensis), ring-necked duck (Aythya collaris), hooded merganser (Lophodytes cucullatus), blue-headed vireo (Vireo solitarius), Henslow's sparrow (Ammodramus henslowii), Le Conte's Sparrow (Ammodramus leconteii), and Smith's longspur (Calcarius pictus). A few species that once occurred in the region are now extinct like the passenger pigeon (Ectopistes migratorius), Carolina parakeet (Conuropsis carolinensis), ivory-billed woodpecker (Campephilus principalis), and Bachman's warbler (Vermivora bachmanii).

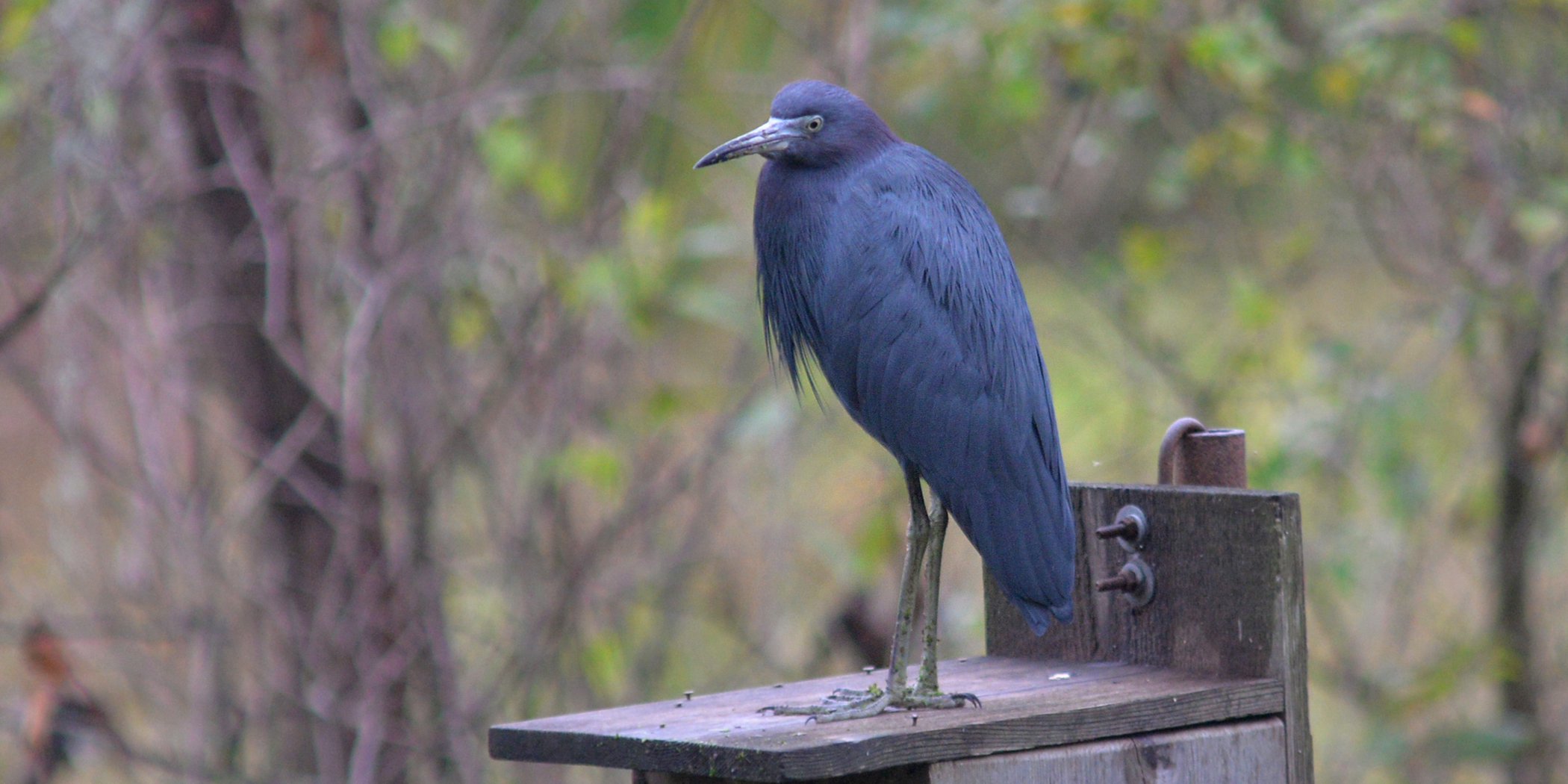
Little blue heron (Egretta caerulea), Fort Bend County, Texas, USA (October 2020)

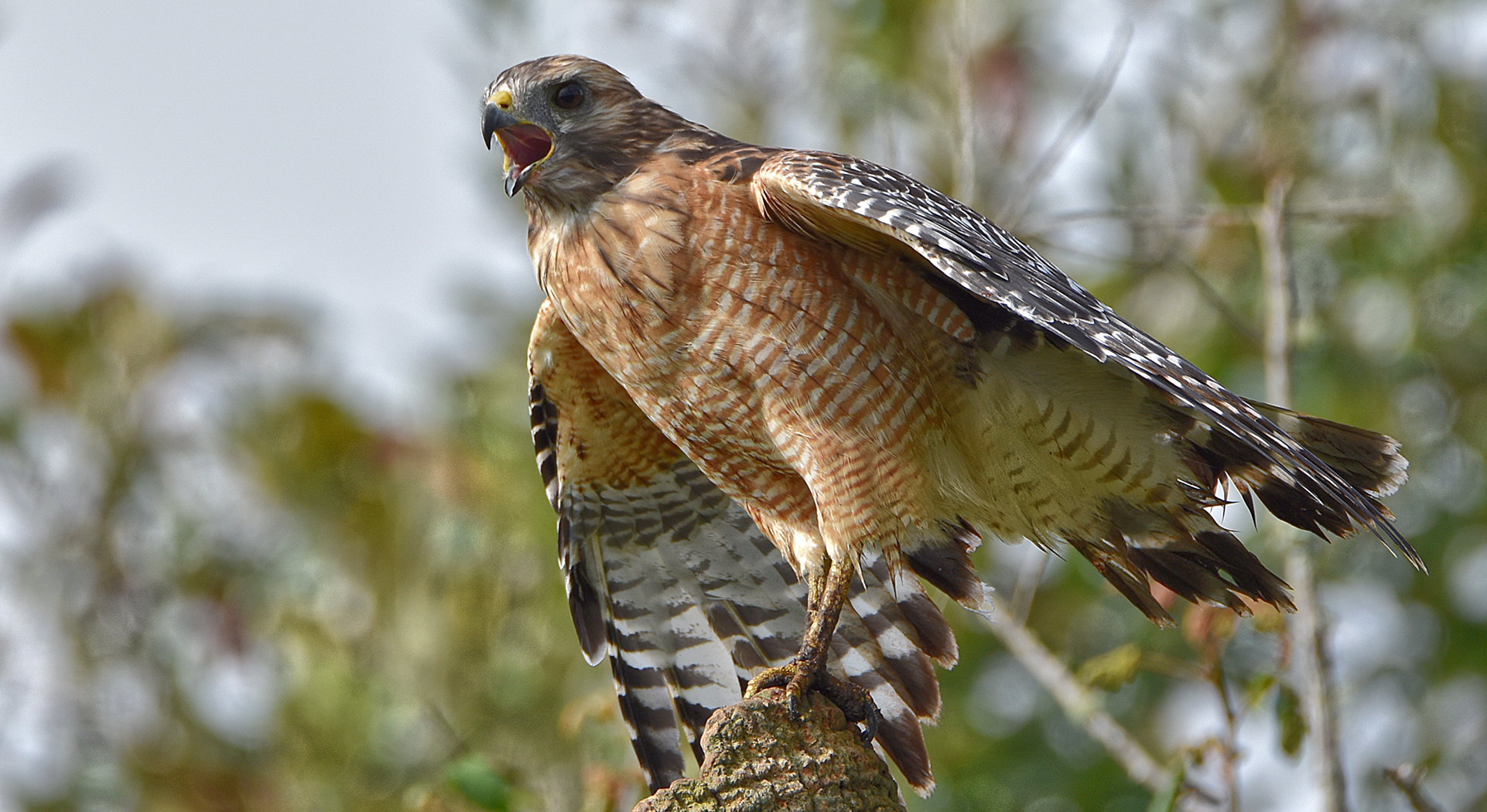
Red-shouldered hawk (Buteo lineatus), locality unknown (August 2019)

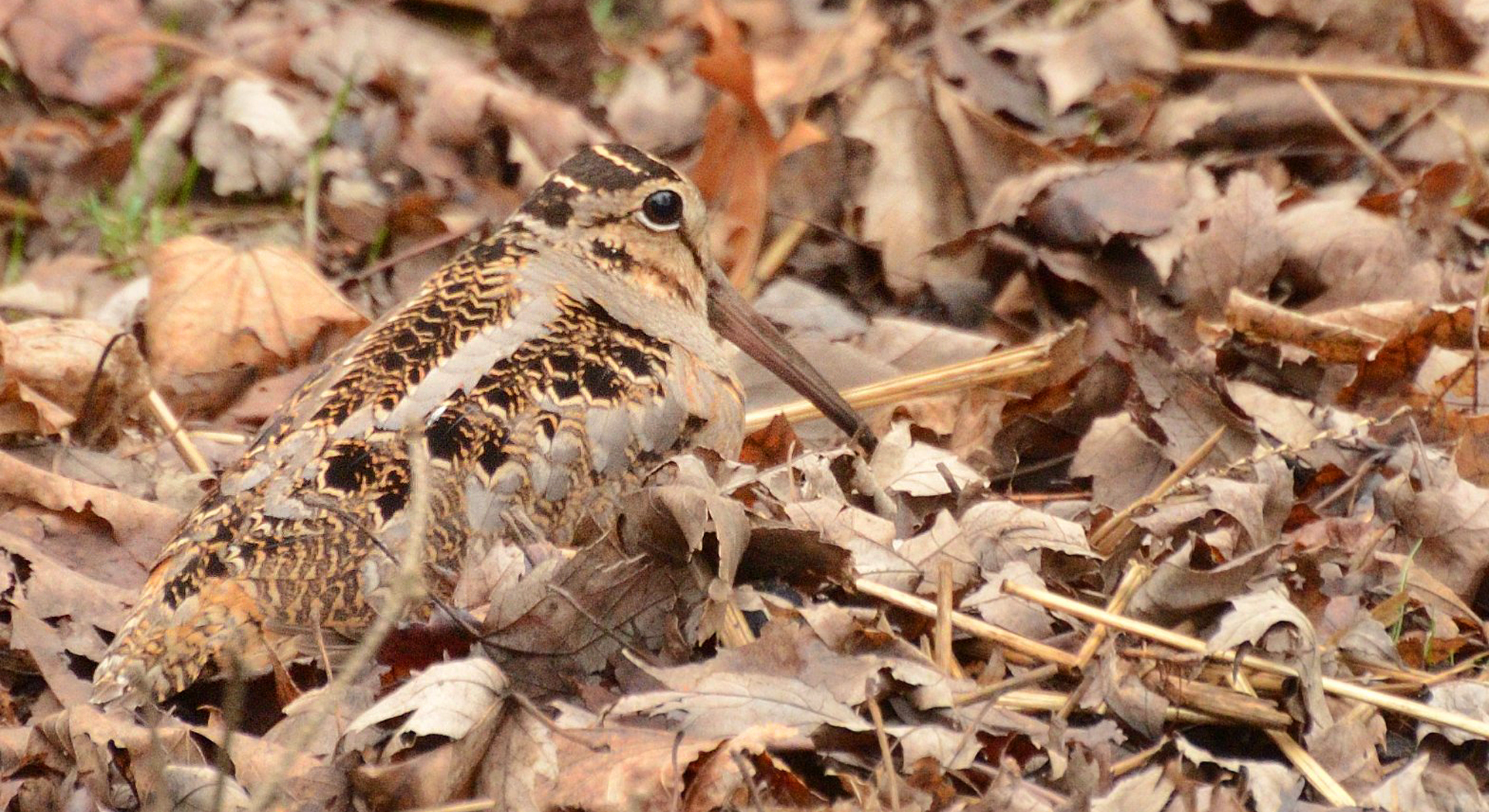
American woodcock (Scolopax minor) Essex, Ontario, Canada (March 2017)

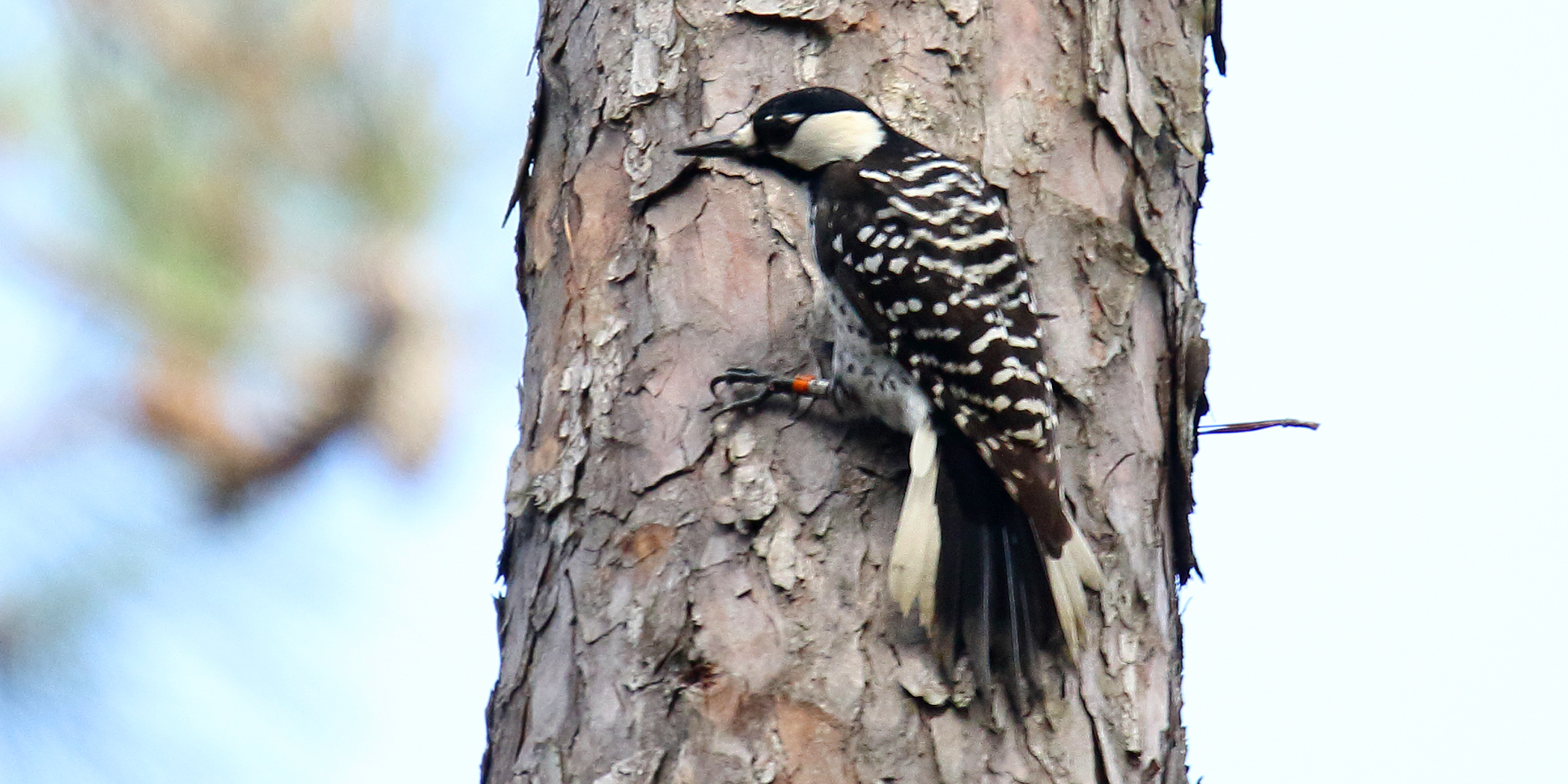
Red-cockaded woodpecker (Picoides borealis), Louisiana, USA (January 2017)

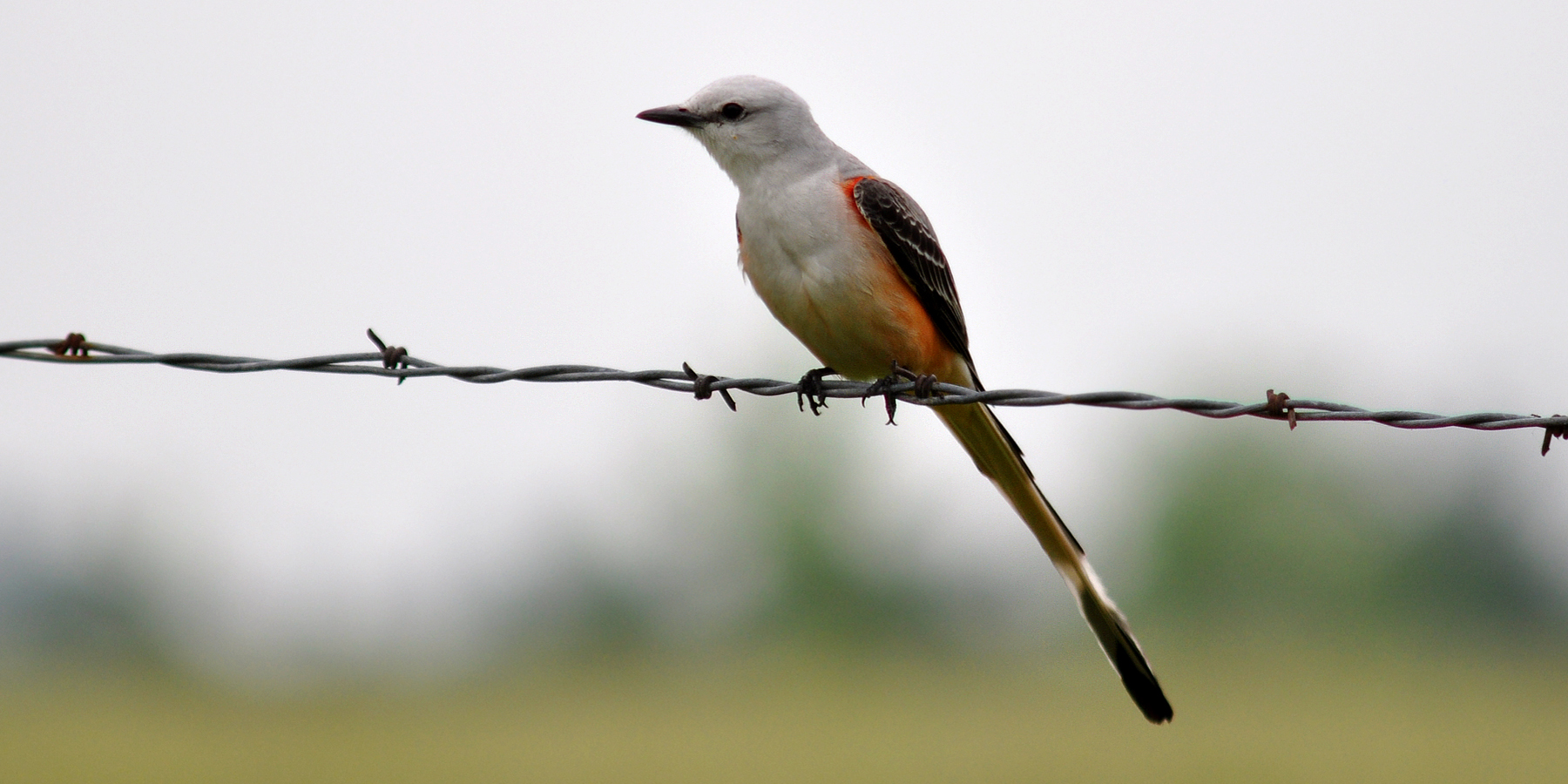
Scissor-tailed flycatcher (Tyrannus forficatus) Walker County, Texas, USA (April 2014)

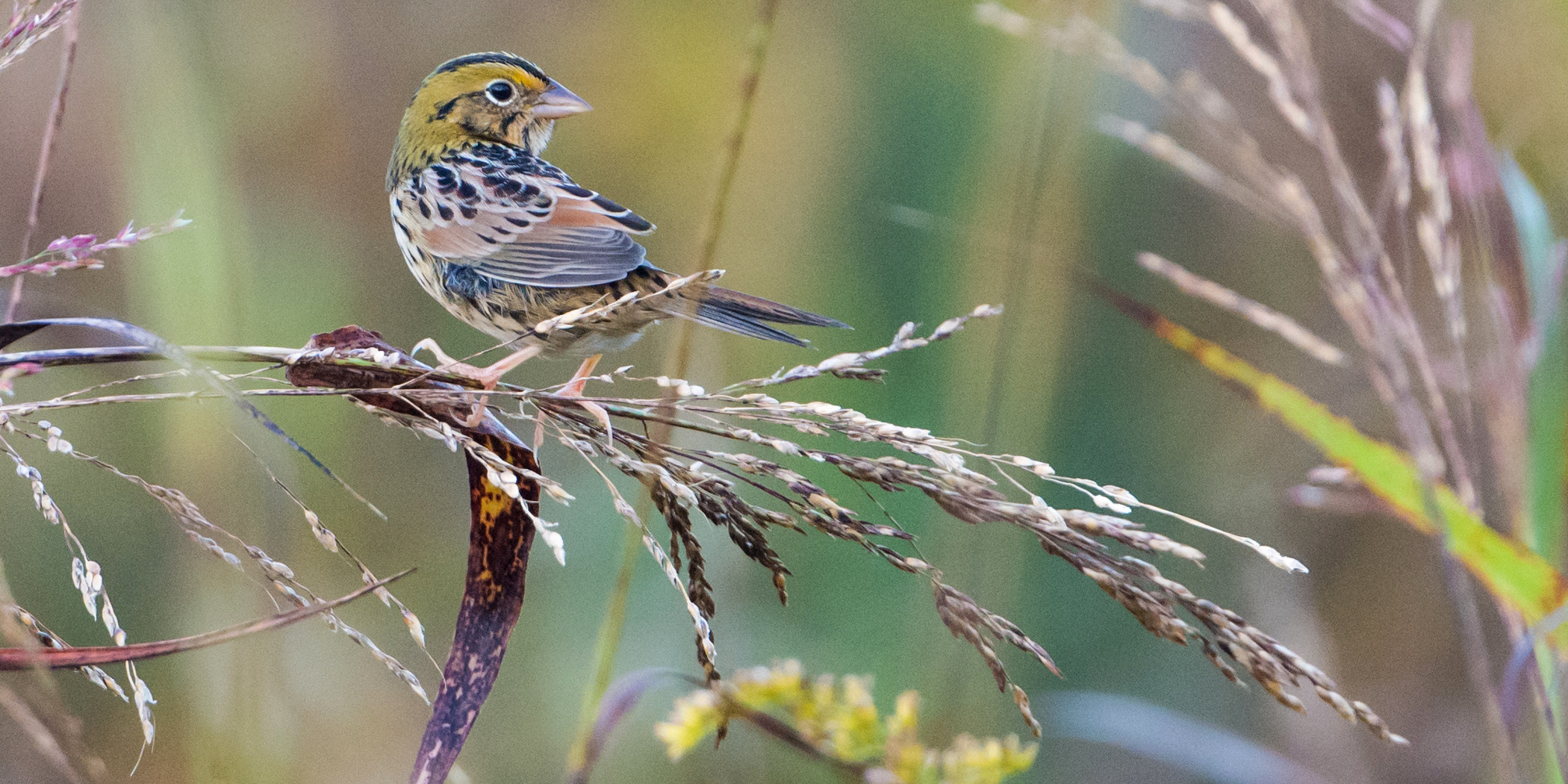
Henslow's sparrow (Ammodramus henslowii), Butler County, Ohio, USA (October 2016)

Reptiles: The American alligator (Alligator mississippiensis) ranges throughout all but the northwestern most area of the region, however they are not particularly common in the forested habitat compared to their abundance in the open marshlands and prairies to the south. The Sabine map turtle (Graptemys sabinensis) is endemic: and among the many other turtles found in the region are the alligator snapping turtle (Macrochelys temminckii), chicken turtle (Deirochelys reticularia), false map turtle (Graptemys pseudogeographica), river cooter (Pseudemys concinna), three-toed box turtle (Terrapene triunguis), eastern mud turtle (Kinosternon subrubrum), razor-backed musk turtle (Sternotherus carinatus), and spiny softshell turtle (Apalone spinifera). Lizards occurring in the Piney Woods include the green anole (Anolis carolinensis), six-lined racerunner (Aspidoscelis sexlineatus), prairie lizard (Sceloporus conssbrinus), slender glass lizard (Ophisaurus attenuatus), and a number of skinks including the five-lined skink (Plestiodon fasciatus), broad-headed skink (Plestiodon laticeps), southern coal skink (Plestiodon anthracinus), and little brown skink (Scincella lateralis). Snake diversity is relatively high in the Piney Woods for a temperate area of its size, with well over 30 species ranging into the region. The Louisiana pinesnake (Pituophis ruthveni) is endemic and Slowinski's cornsnake (Pantherophis slowinskii) is nearly endemic. Five venomous snakes occur in the region, the Texas coralsnake (Micrurus tener), eastern copperhead (Agkistrodon contortrix), northern cottonmouth (Agkistrodon piscivorus), timber rattlesnake (Crotalus horridus), and pygmy rattlesnake (Sistrurus miliarius). Some of the non-venomous snakes include the rough greensnake (Opheodrys aestivus), Dekay's brownsnake (Storeria dekayi), eastern hog-nosed snake (Heterodon platirhinos), western ribbonsnake (Thamnophis proximus), glossy swampsnake (Liodytes rigida), southern watersnake (Nerodia fasciata), diamond-back watersnake (Nerodia rhombifer), red-bellied mudsnake (Farancia abacura), North American racer (Coluber constrictor), coachwhip (Masticophis flagellum), scarletsnake (Cemophora coccinea), prairie kingsnake (Lampropeltis calligaster), speckled kingsnake (Lampropeltis holbrooki), western ratsnake (Pantherophis obsoletus). and at least a dozen others.

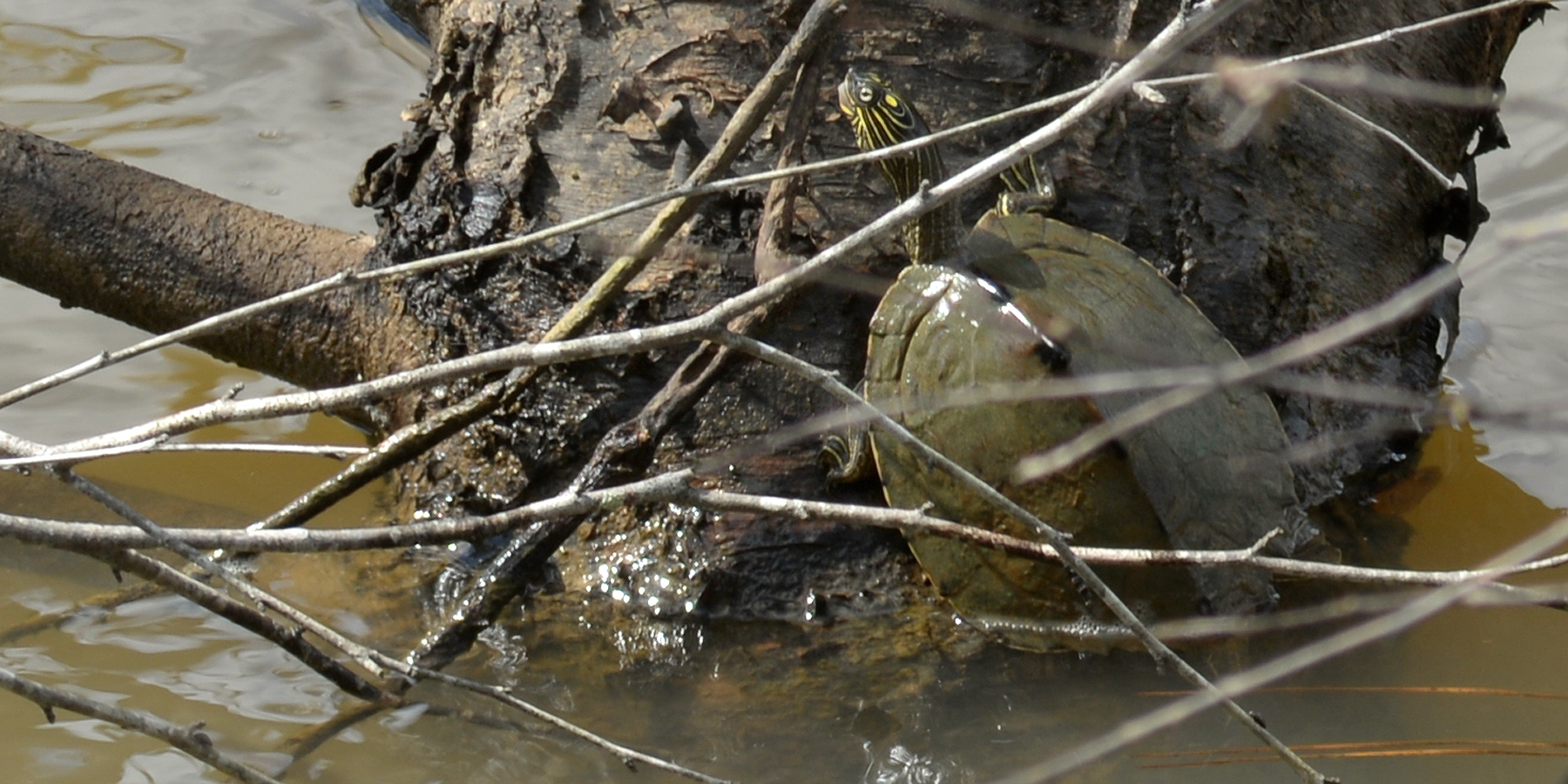
Sabine map turtle (Graptemys sabinensis), in situ, Orange County Texas. (October 2016).

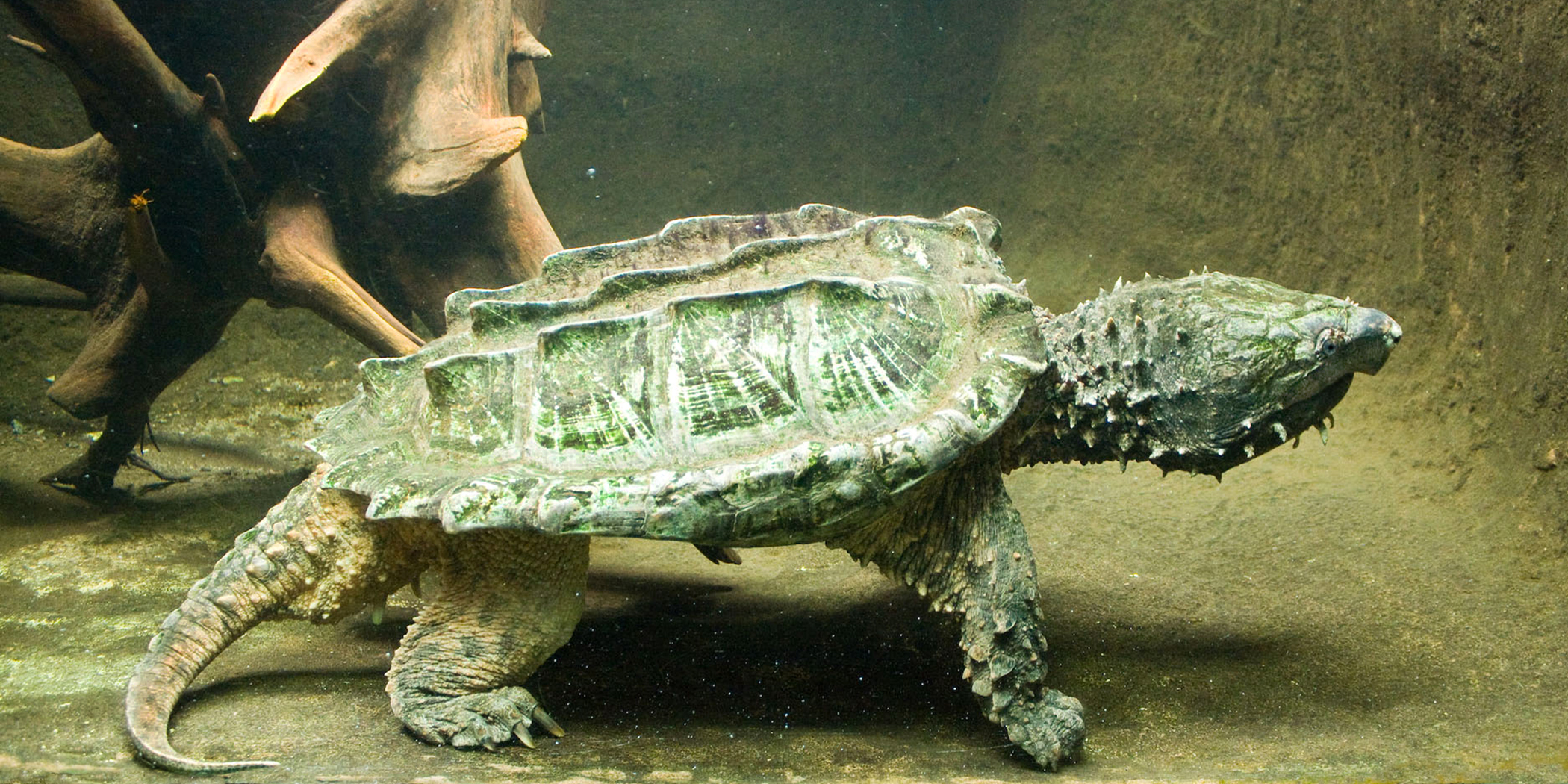
Alligator snapping turtle (Macrochelys temminckii), aquarium display (2011)

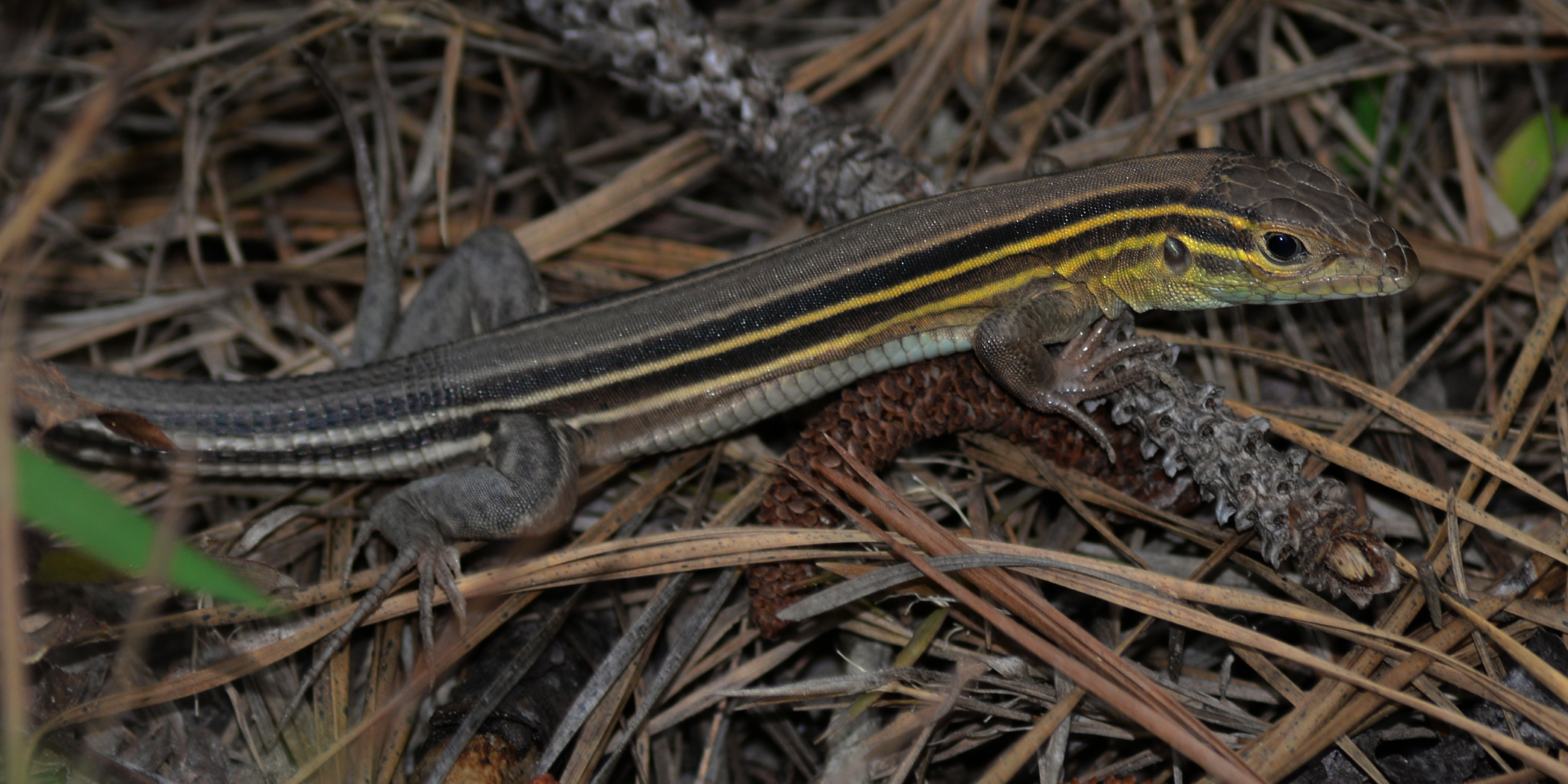
Six-lined racerunner (Aspidoscelis sexlineatus), in situ, Hardin County, Texas (April 2020).

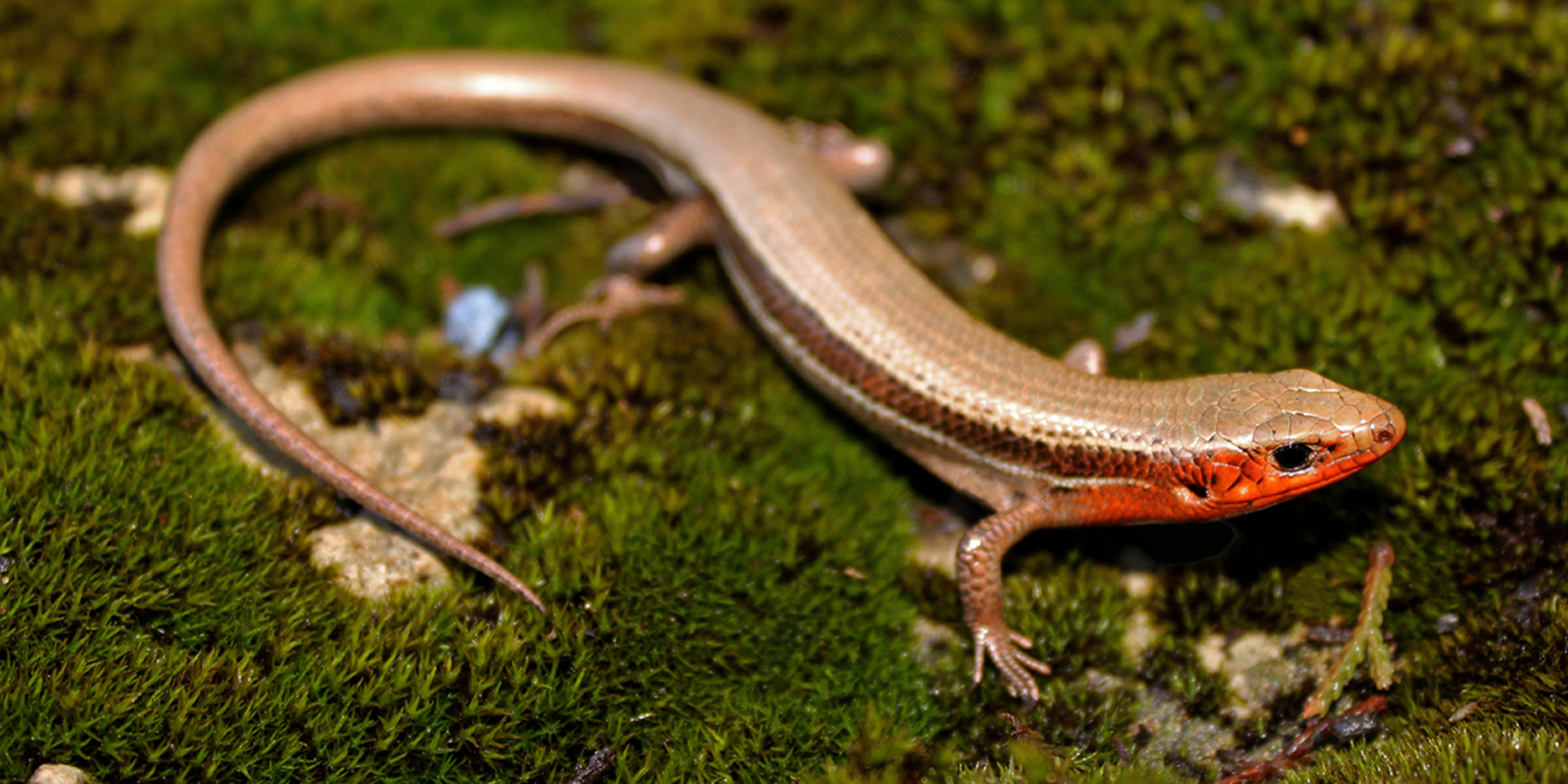
Southern coal skink (Plestiodon anthracinus), Jefferson Co, Missouri (March 2016)

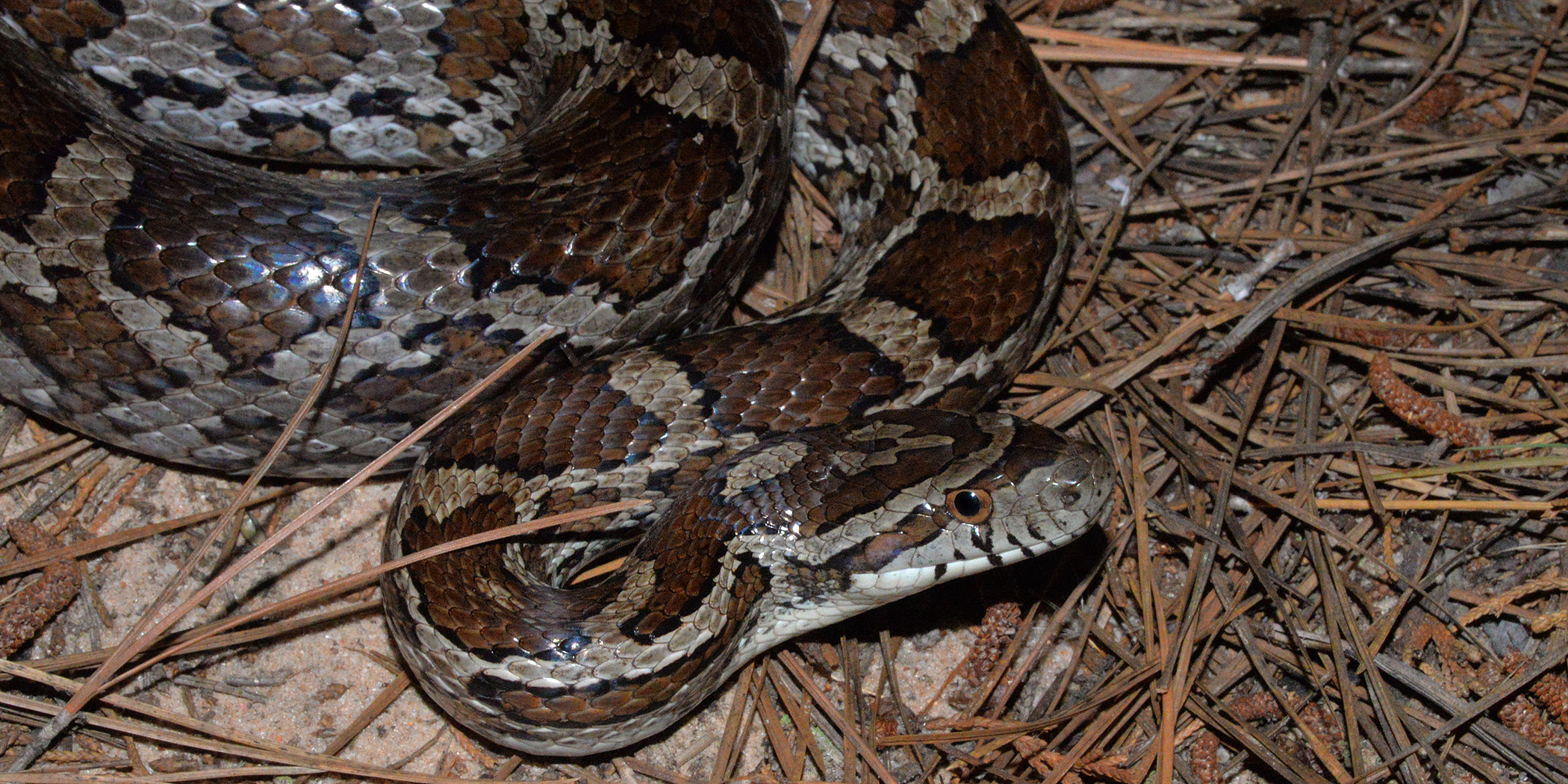
Slowinski's cornsnake (Pantherophis slowinskii), in situ, Colorado County, Texas (May 2018).

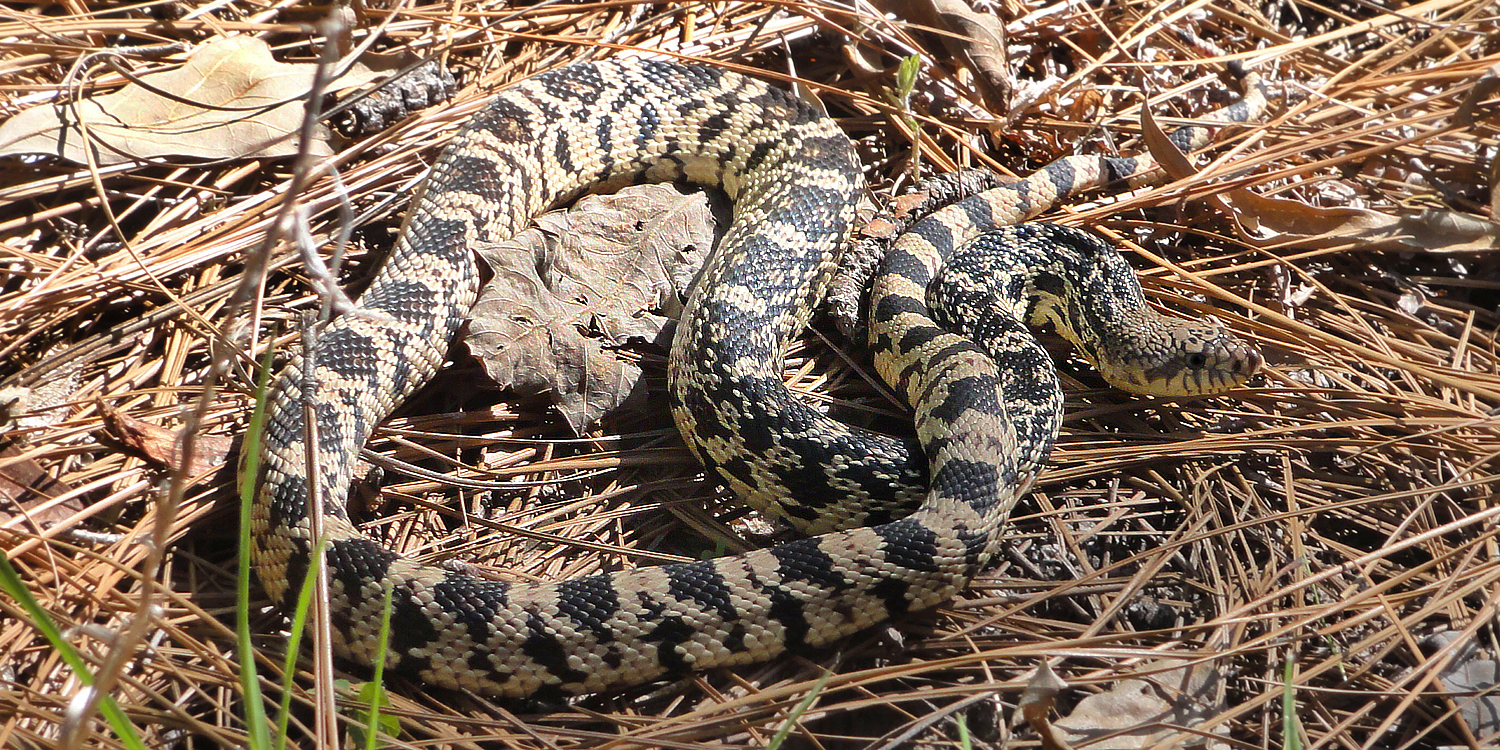
Louisiana pinesnake (Pituophis ruthveni), Louisiana, USA (April 2011)

Amphibians: Over a dozen species of salamanders occur in the Piney Woods. The Louisiana slimy salamander (Plethodon kisatchie) of northern Louisiana and adjacent areas of southern Arkansas is endemic to the region. The three-toed amphiuma (Amphiuma tridactylum), commonly growing 18 to 30 inches (46–76 cm.), and other species such as the Gulf Coast waterdog (Necturus beyeri), Red River mudpuppy (Necturus louisianensis), and western lesser siren (Siren intermedia) are entirely aquatic. Other salamanders include the spotted salamander (Ambystoma maculatum), marbled salamander (Ambystoma opacum), mole salamander (Ambystoma talpoideum), small-mouthed salamander (Ambystoma texanum), spotted dusky salamander (Desmognathus conanti), western dwarf salamander (Eurycea paludicola), and the eastern newt (Notophthalmus viridescens). Anurans (frogs and toads) found in the Piney Woods include Blanchard's cricket frog (Acris blanchardi), Cope's gray treefrog (Hyla chrysoscelis), green treefrog (Hyla cinerea), cajun chorus frog (Pseudacris fouquettei), spring peeper (Pseudacris crucifer), eastern narrow-mouthed toad (Gastrophryne carolinensis), Hurter's spadefoot toad (Scaphiopus hurterii), American bullfrog (Lithobates catesbeianus), bronze frog (Lithobates clamitans), pickerel frog (Lithobates palustris), and southern leopard frog (Lithobates sphenocephalus). The American toad (Anaxyrus americanus) occurs in northern areas and the Gulf Coast toad (Incilius nebulifer) occurs in the south. The Fowler's toad (Anaxyrus fowleri) ranges throughout Arkansas and Louisiana, but populations in east Texas intergraded with Woodhouse's toad (Anaxyrus woodhousii), however some regard the east Texas populations as a distinct species, the east Texas toad (Anaxyrus velatus).

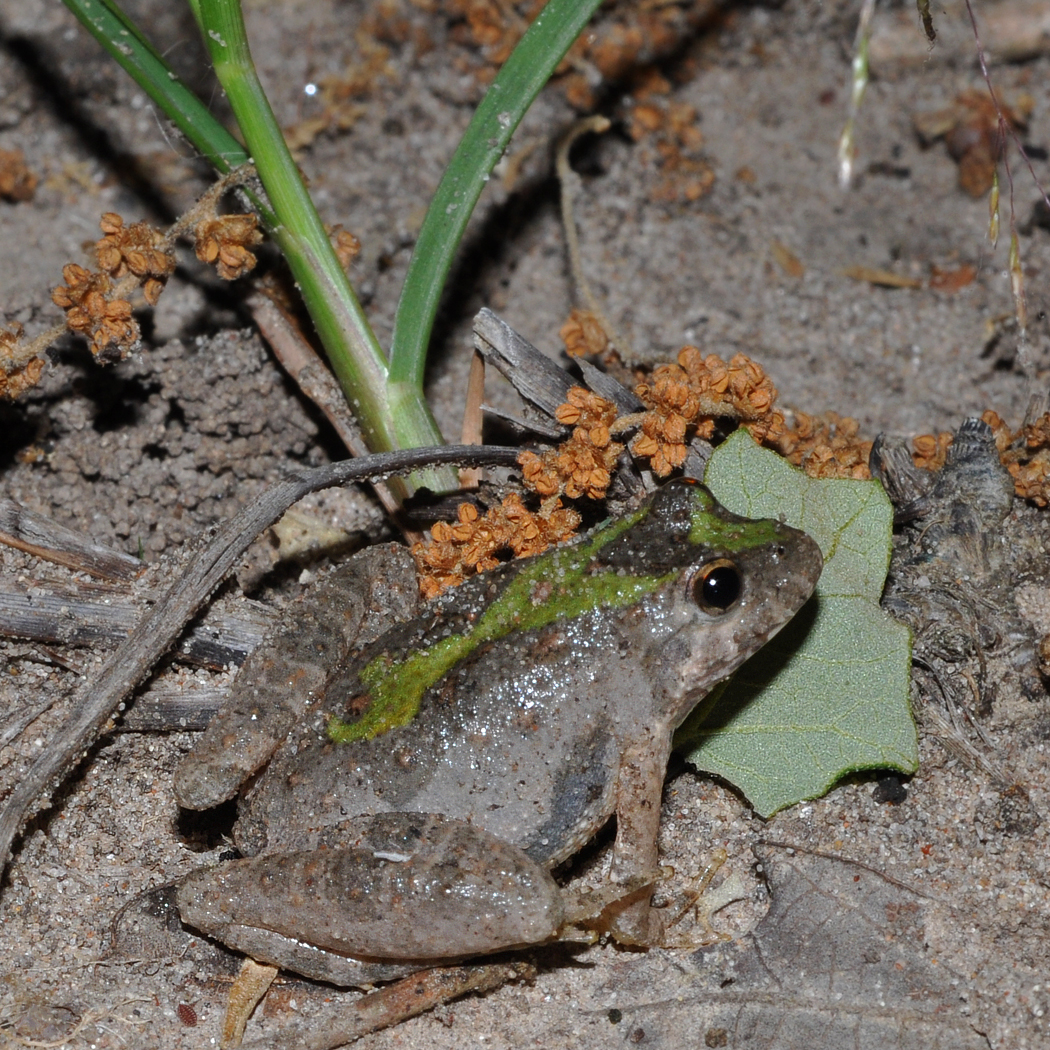
Blanchard's cricket frog (Acris blanchardi), Montgomery Co. TX (April 2014)

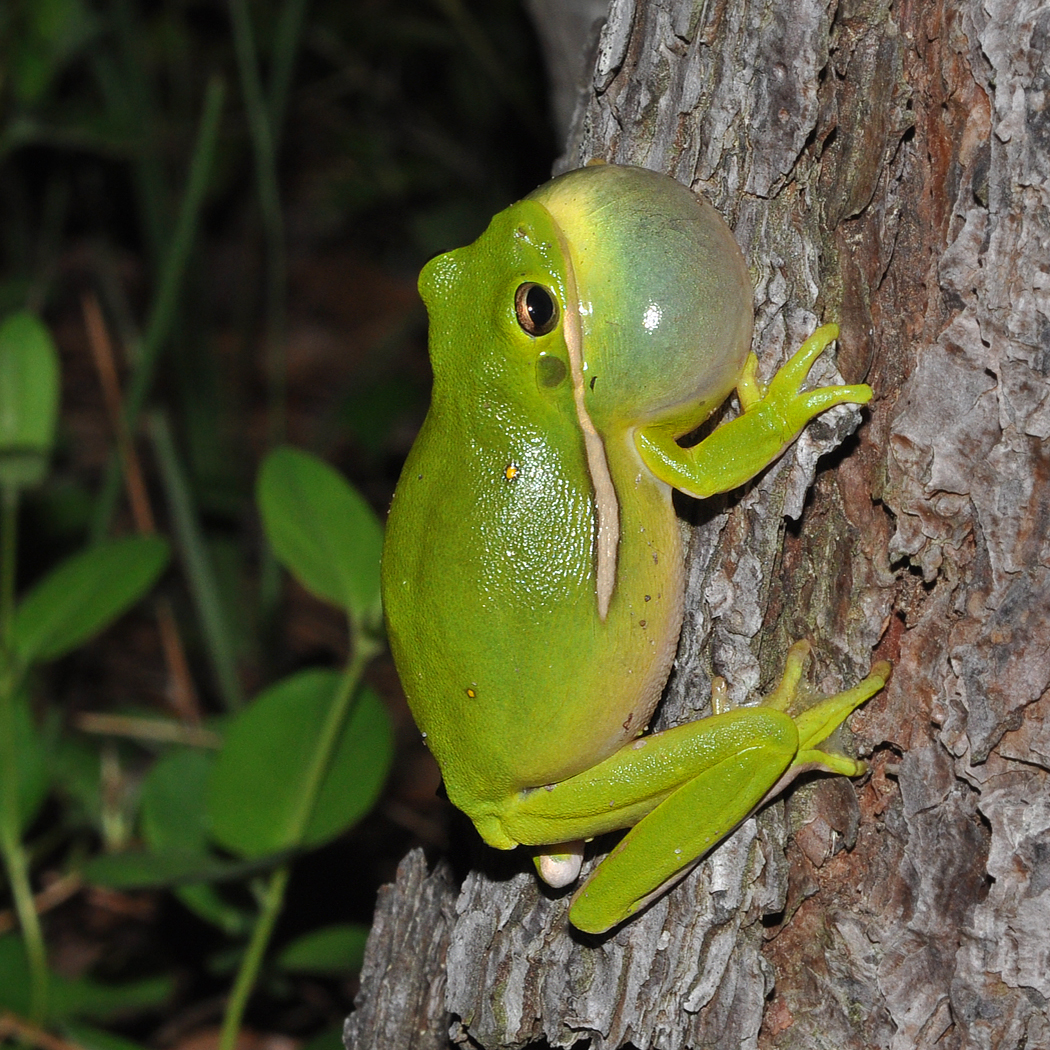
Green treefrog (Hyla cinerea), Montgomery Co. TX (April 2014)

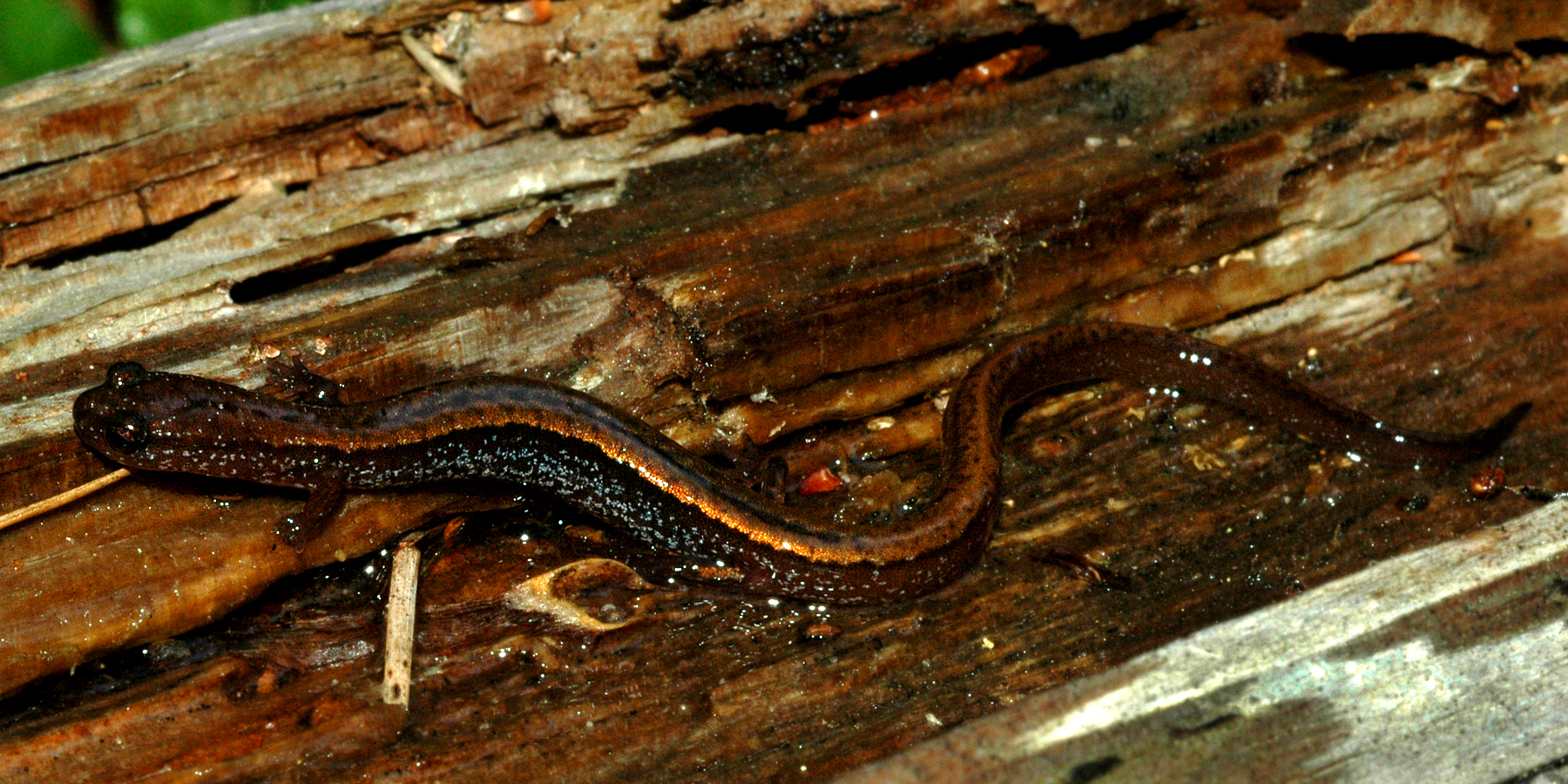
Dwarf salamander (Eurycea [quadridigitata] paludicola) Polk Co. TX (April 2009)

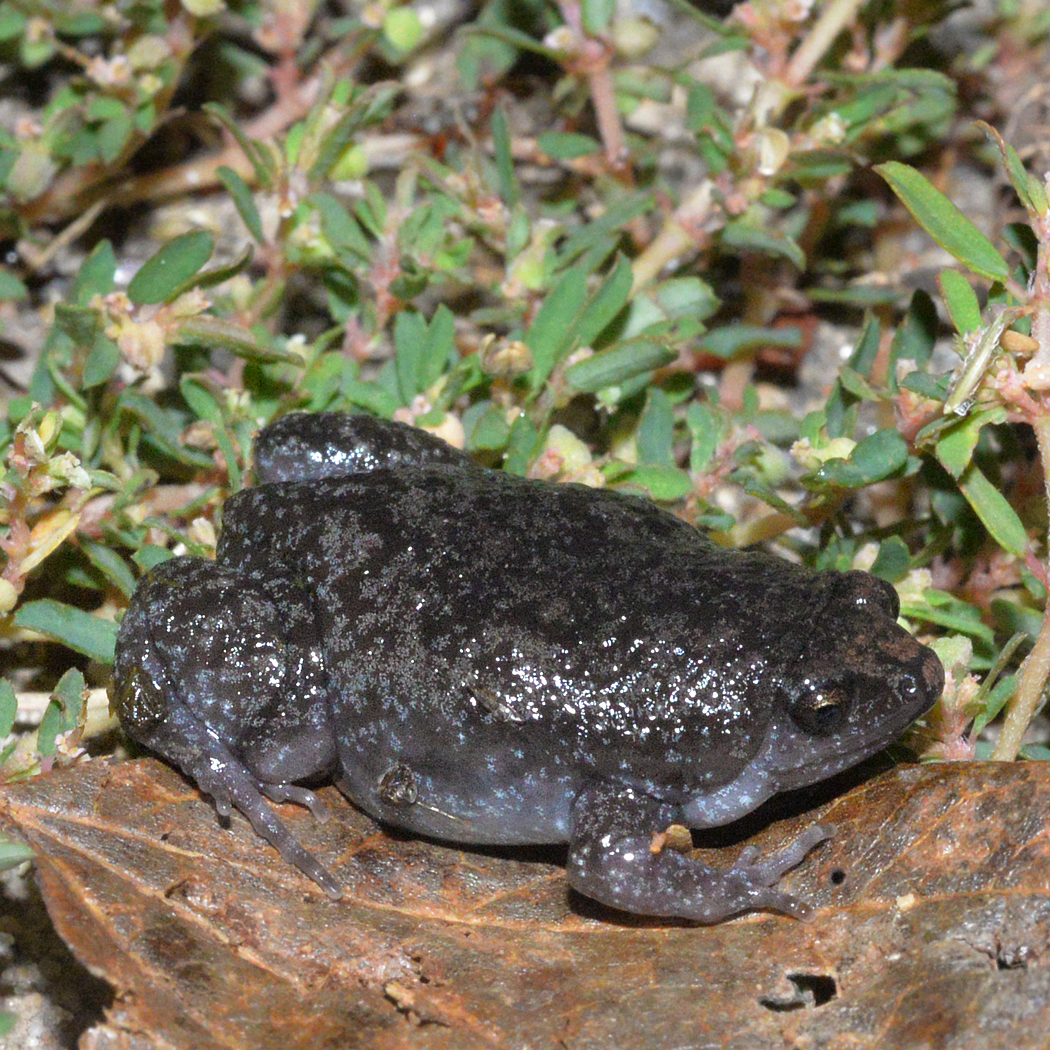
Narrow-mouthed toad (Gastrophryne carolinensis), Chambers Co., TX (Sept 2018)

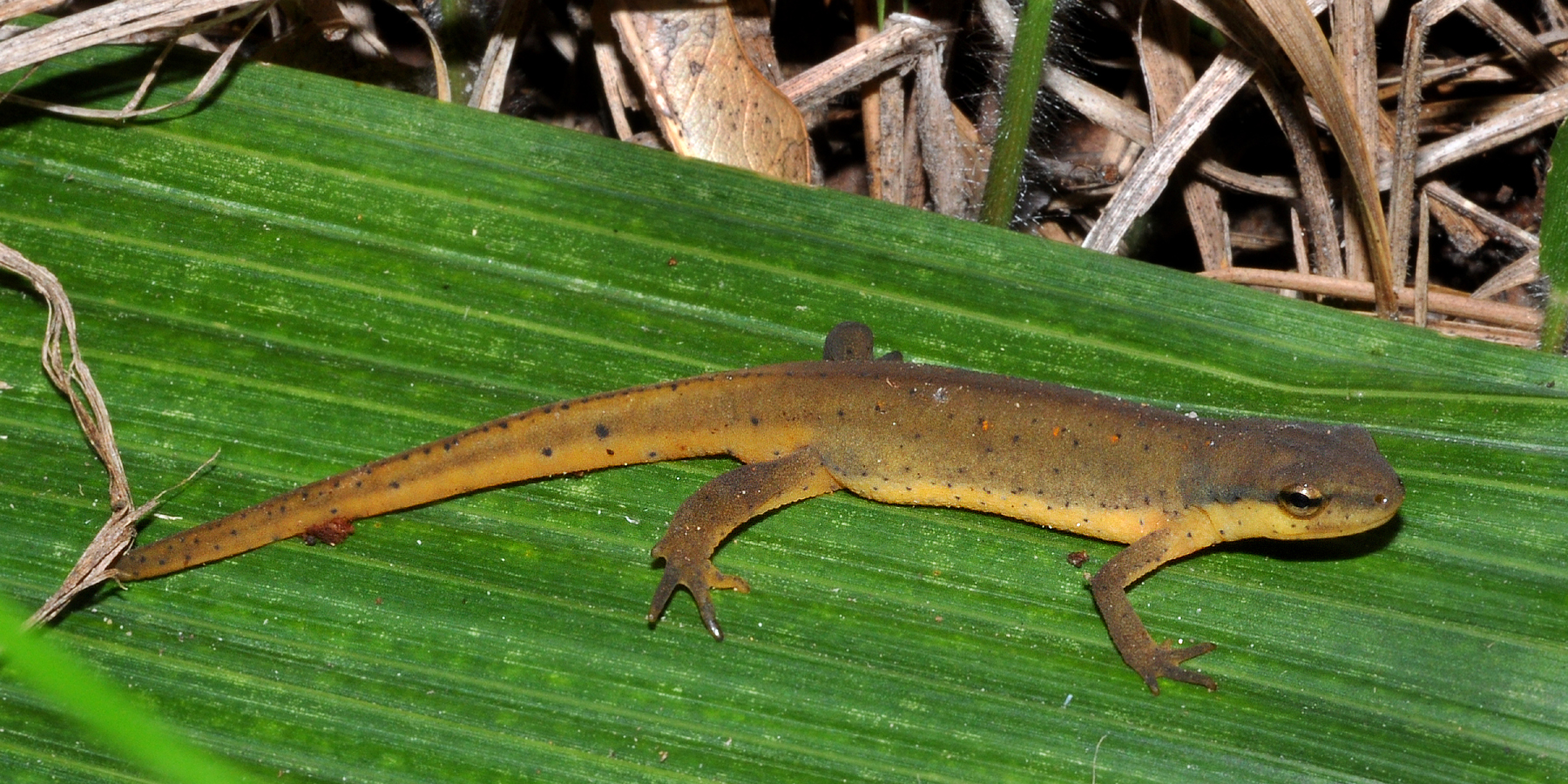
Eastern newt (Notophthalmus viridescens) Walker Co. TX (May 2012)

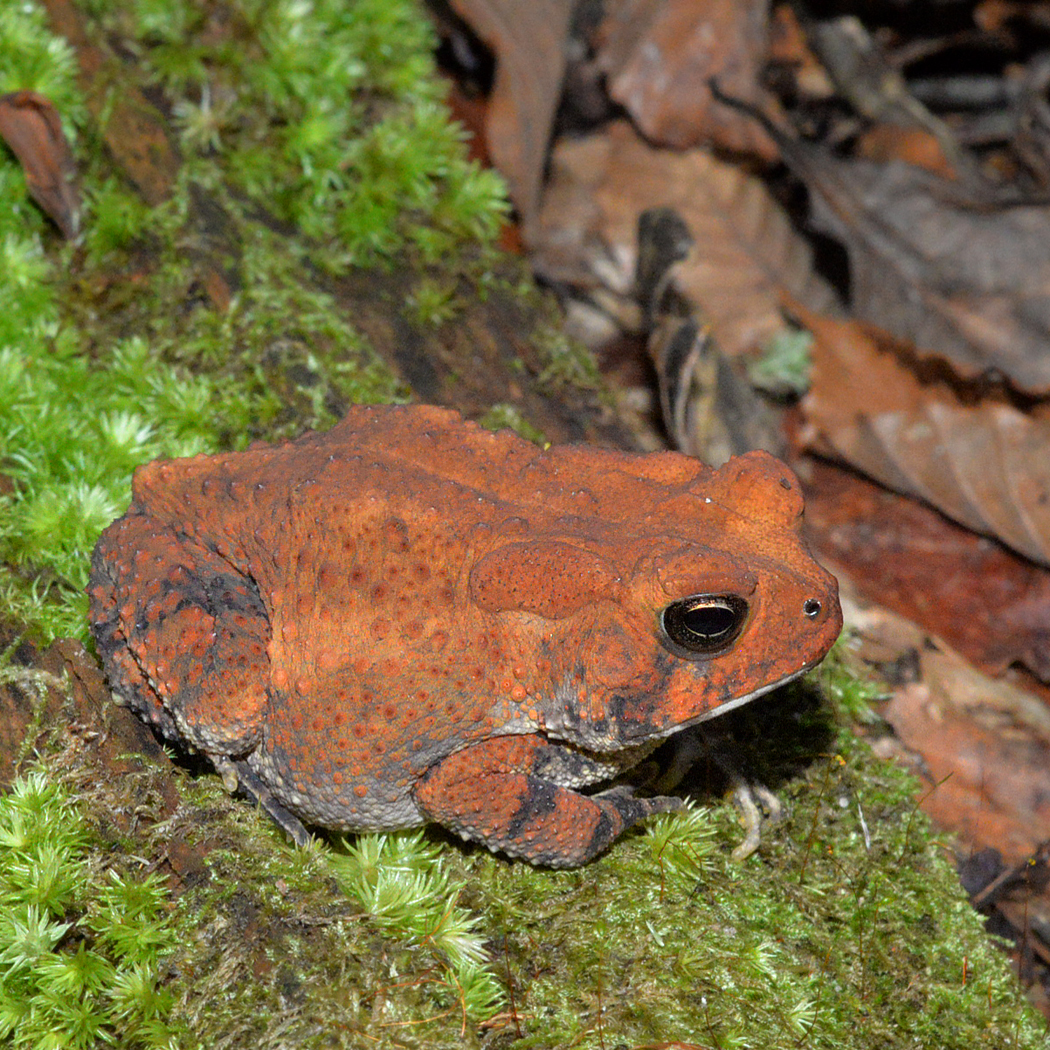
East Texas toad (Anaxyrus velatus), Hardin Co. TX (Oct 2019)

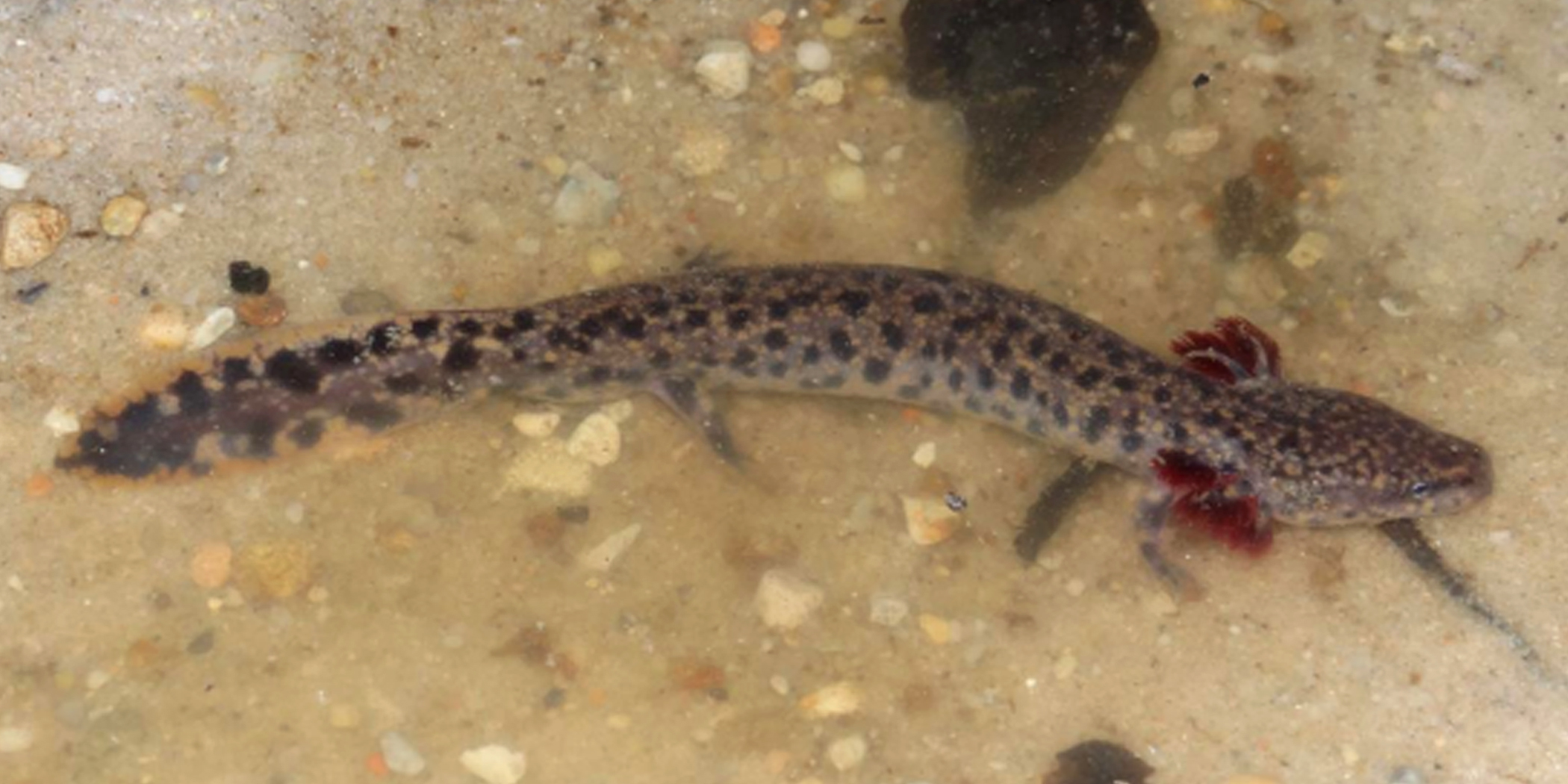
Gulf Coast waterdog (Necturus beyeri), St. Tammany Parish, Louisiana

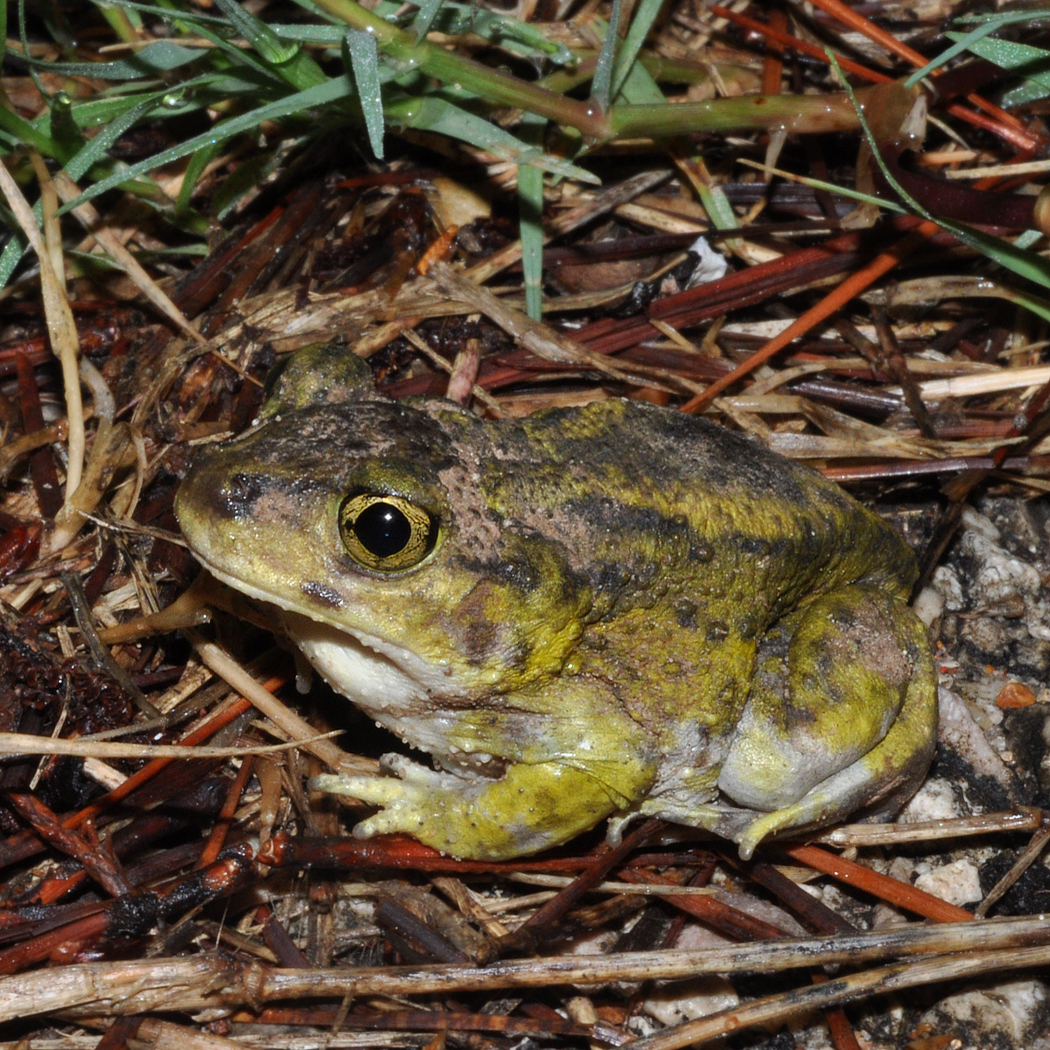
Hurter's spadefoot Toad (Scaphiopus hurterii), Colorado Co., TX (May 2014)

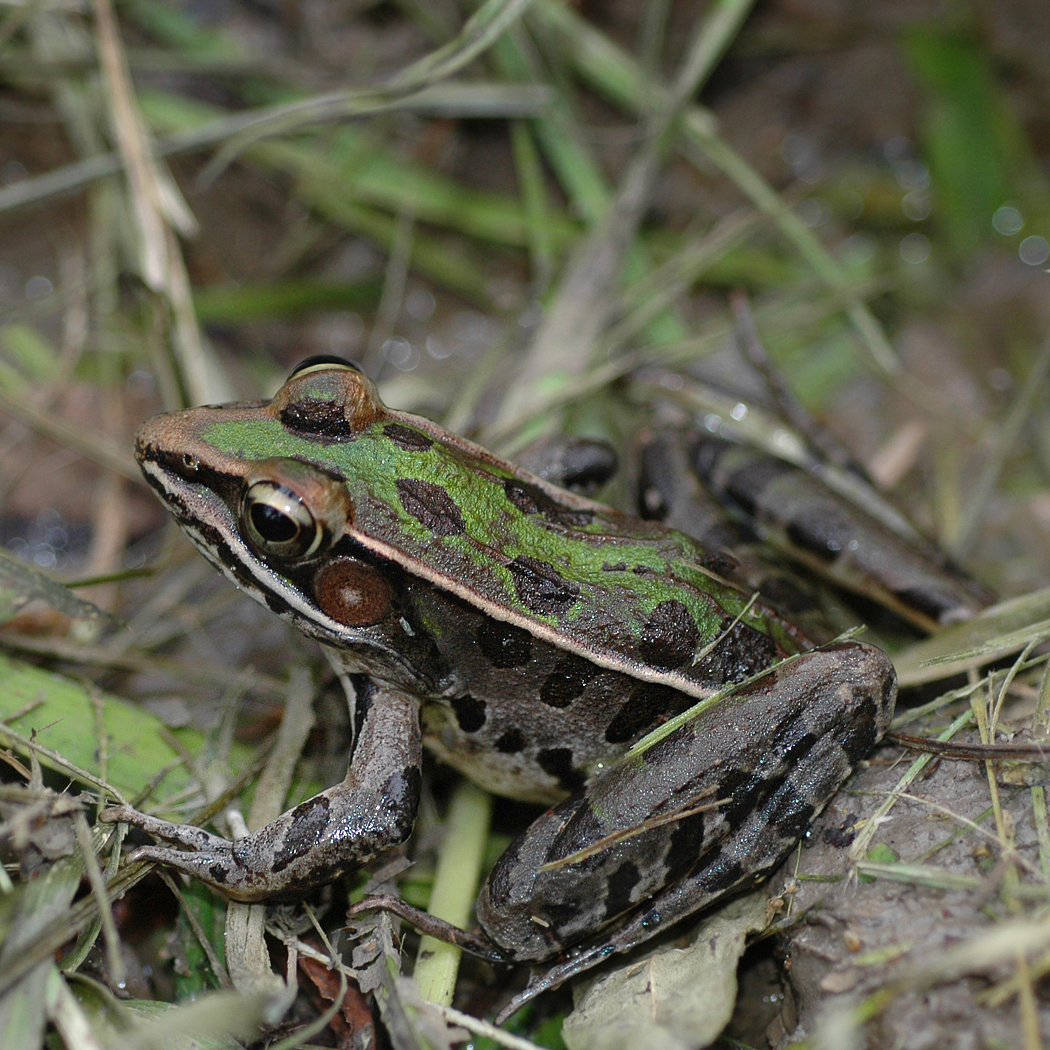
Southern leopard frog (Lithobates sphenocephalus), Liberty Co. TX (April 2009)

Fish: The Piney Woods are rich in fish diversity. Fish occurring in the region include the chestnut lamprey (Ichthyomyzon castaneus), southern brook lamprey (Ichthyomyzon gagei), paddlefish (Polyodon spathula), alligator gar (Atractosteus spatula), spotted gar (Lepisosteus oculatus), bowfin (Amia calva), and redfin pickerel (Esox americanus). Some sport fish native to the Piney Woods include largemouth bass (Micropterus salmoides), spotted bass (Micropterus punctulatus), white bass (Morone chrysops), yellow bass (Morone mississippiensis), black crappie (Pomoxis nigromaculatus), white crappie (Pomoxis annularis), blue catfish (Ictalurus furcatus), channel catfish (Ictalurus punctatus), yellow bullhead (Ictalurus natalis), black bullhead (Ictalurus melas), redear sunfish (Lepomis microlophus), and longear sunfish (Lepomis megalotis). A multitude of smaller fish inhabit the waters of the Piney Woods. Endemics include the bluehead shiner (Pteronotropis hubbsi) and Creole darter (Etheostoma collettei). The western mosquitofish (Gambusia affinis), a species that has been widely introduced around the world and considered a pest in many areas, is a native in the Piney Woods. Just a few of the other small fish in the region include blacktail shiner (Cyprinella venusta), pallid shiner (Hybopsis amnis), blackspot shiner (Notropis atrocaudalis), peppered shiner (Notropis perpallidus), Sabine shiner (Notropis sabinae), weed shiner (Notropis texanus), blacktail redhorse (Moxostoma poecilurum), freckled madtom (Noturus nocturnus), brown madtom (Noturus phaeus), Blair's starhead topminnow (Fundulus blairae), golden topminnow (Fundulus chrysotus), blachspotted topminnow (Fundulus olivaceus), bantma sunfish (Lepomis symmetricus), scaly sand darter (Ammocrypta vivax), redspot darter (Etheostoma artesiae), mud darter (Etheostoma asprigene), harlequin darter (Etheostoma histrio), and goldstripe darter (Etheostoma parvipinne).

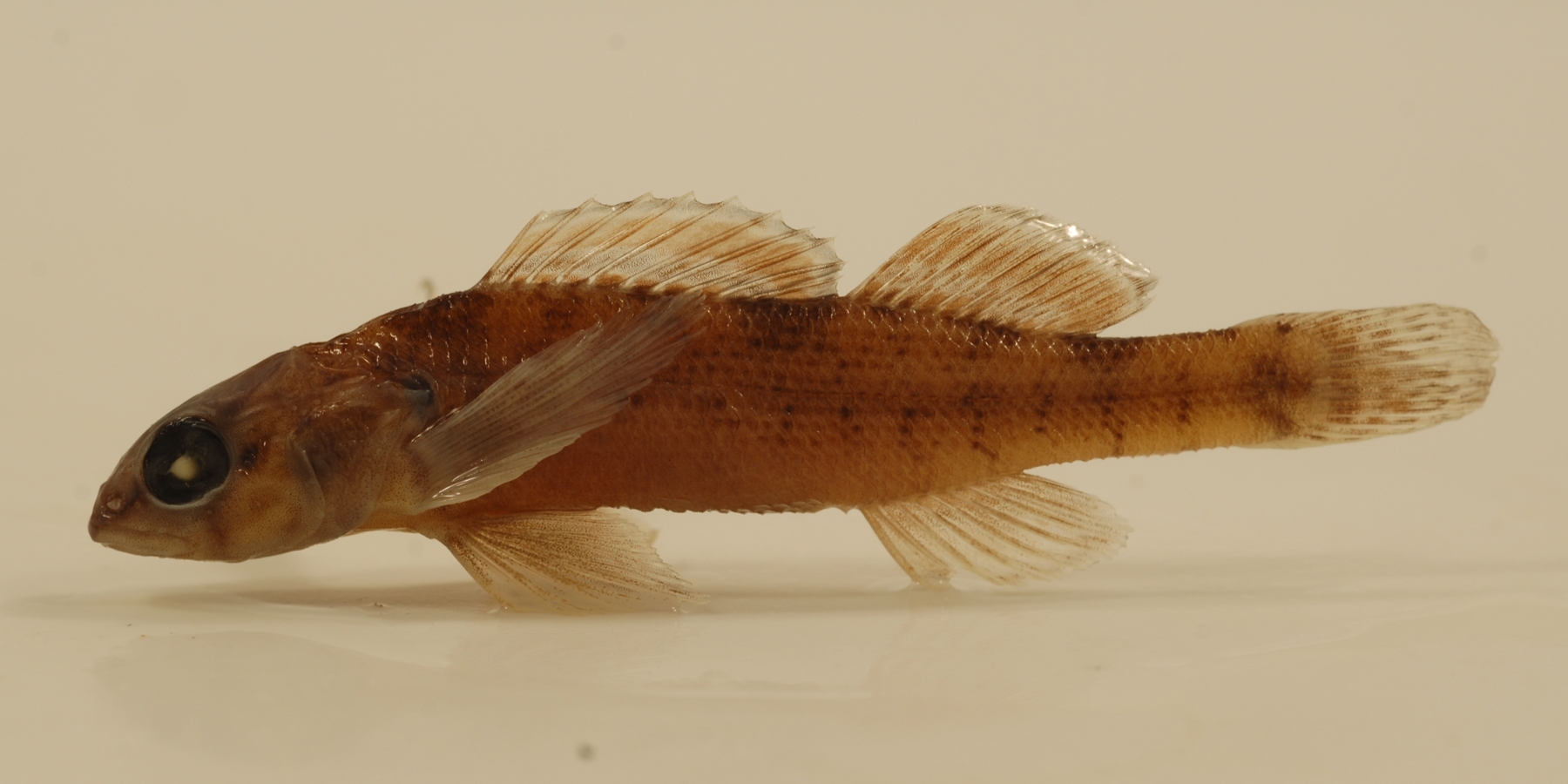
Creole darter (Etheostoma collettei) endemic to the Piney Woods, Saline River Drainage, Arkansas (March 2016).

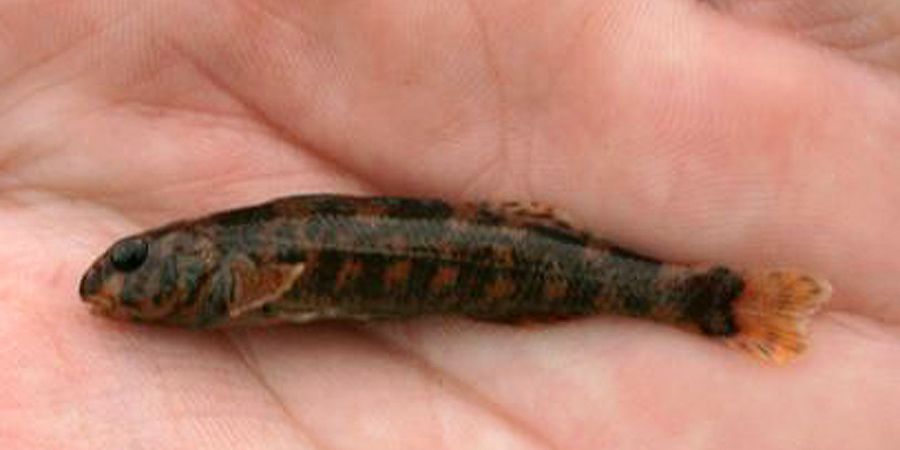
Harlequin darter (Etheostoma histrio), Sabine River, Texas (September 2009).

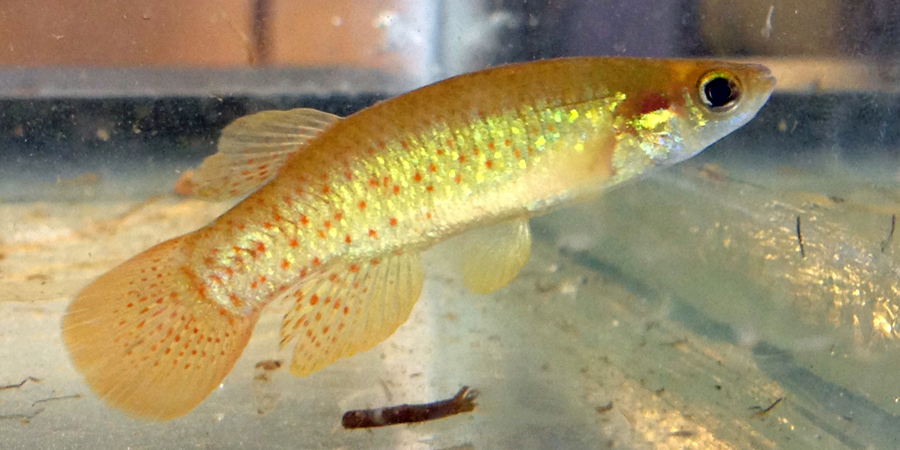
Golden topminnow (Fundulus chrysotus) Mississippi (August 2014).

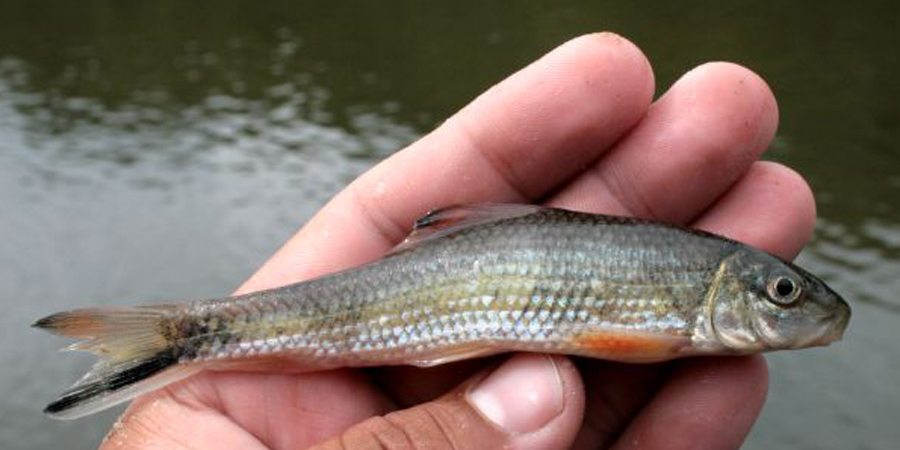
Blacktail Redhorse (Moxostoma poecilurum). Sabine River, Texas (September 2009).

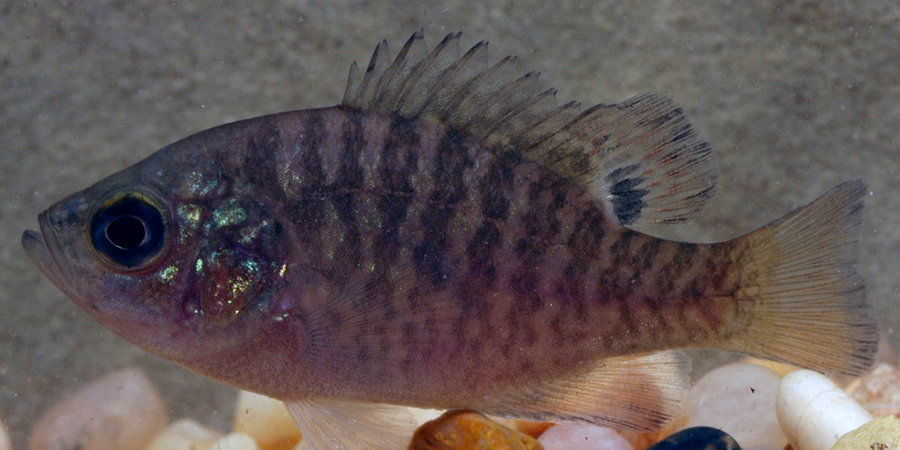
Bantma sunfish (Lepomis symmetricus), Liberty County, TX (October 2019).

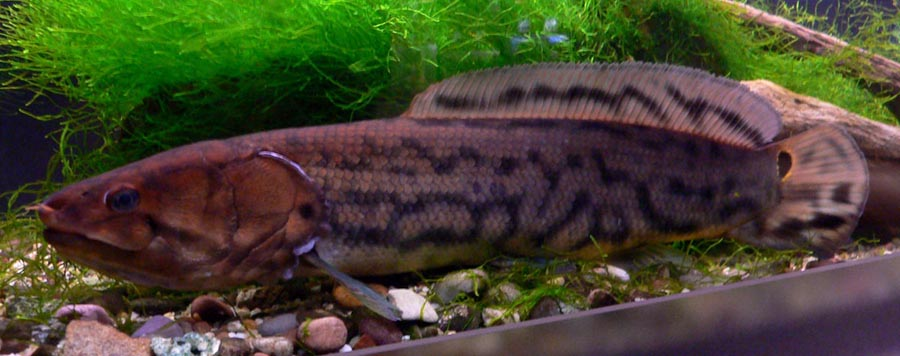
Bowfin (Amia calva), Steinhart Aquarium, San Francisco, California.

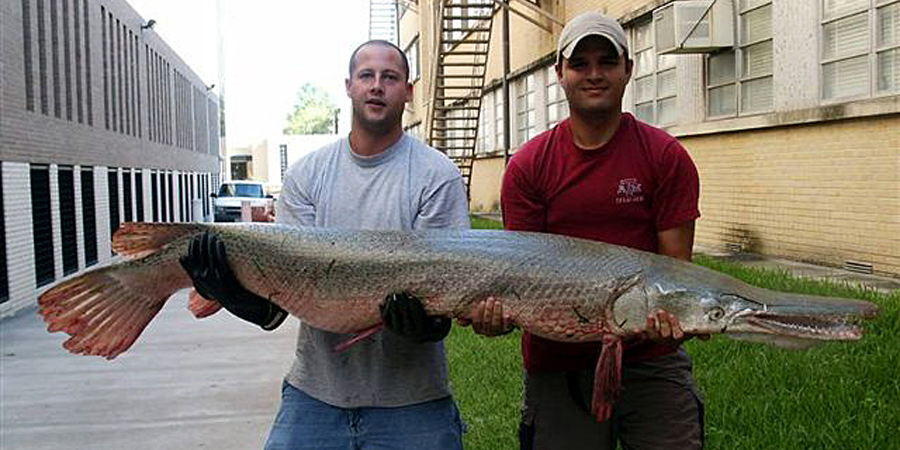
Alligator gar (Atractosteus spatula), Brazos River system, Texas (Nov. 2004).

Some endemic flora and fauna of the Piney Woods (threatened species: Federal++; State +: historical isolated Illinois population now extirpated = *).

- Nodding yucca (Yucca cernua): Texas
- Neches River rosemallow (Hibiscus dasycalyx) ++: Texas +
- Bayou Bodcau crayfish (Bouchardina robisoni): Arkansas
- Slenderwrist burrowing crayfish (Fallicambarus petilicarpus): Arkansas
- Texas emerald dragonfly (Somatochlora margarita): Louisiana, Texas
- Sarracenia spiketail dragonfly (Cordulegaster sarracenia): Louisiana, Texas
- Bluehead shiner (Pteronotropis hubbsi): Arkansas, Oklahoma, Louisiana, Texas + *
- Creole darter (Etheostoma collettei): Arkansas, Louisiana
- Louisiana slimy salamander (Plethodon kisatchie): Arkansas, Louisiana
- Sabine map turtle (Graptemys sabinensis): Louisiana, Texas
- Louisiana pinesnake (Pituophis ruthveni) ++: Louisiana +, Texas +
- Slowinski's cornsnake (Pantherophis slowinskii): Arkansas, Louisiana, Texas

== Level IV ecoregions ==
Within the U.S. Environmental Protection Agency's ecoregions scheme, the Piney Woods are known as the South Central Plains, a Level III ecoregion. Within the South Central Plains, eight Level IV ecoregions are identified: Tertiary Uplands, Floodplains and Low Terraces, Pleistocene Fluvial Terraces, Cretaceous Dissected Uplands, Southern Tertiary Uplands, Flatwoods, Red River Bottomlands, and Blackland Prairie.

Map of the South Central Plains' Level IV ecoregions

=== Tertiary Uplands (35a) ===
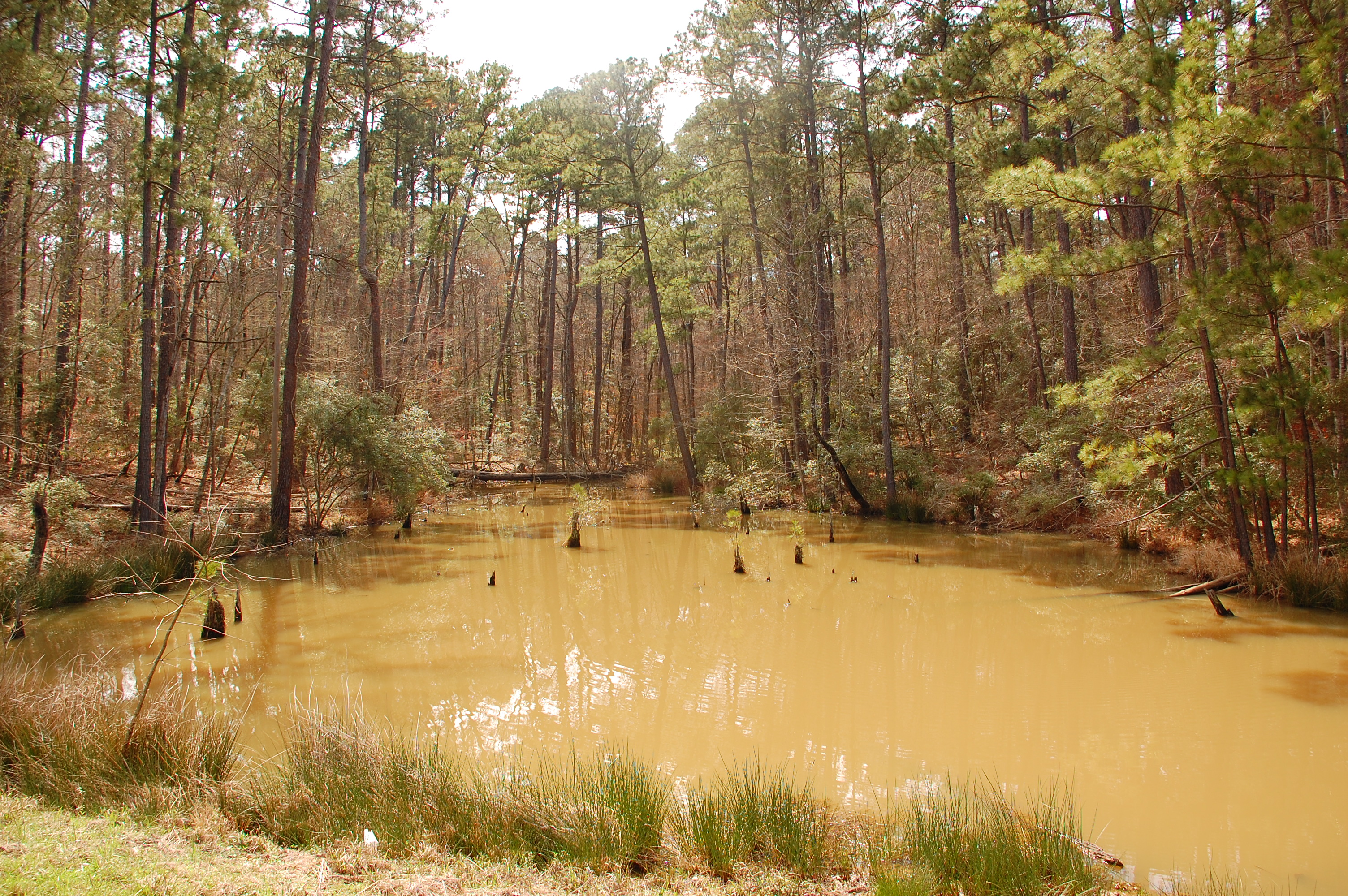
A pond in Sabine National Forest, in the Tertiary Uplands (35a)

The rolling Tertiary Uplands, gently to moderately sloping, cover a large area in eastern Texas, southern Arkansas, and northern Louisiana. The rolling Tertiary Uplands are dominated by commercial pine plantations that have replaced the native oak–hickory–pine forest.

Ecoregion 35a is underlain by poorly-consolidated Tertiary sand, silt, and gravel; it lacks the Cretaceous, often calcareous rocks of the Cretaceous Dissected Uplands (35d) and the extensive Quaternary alluvium of Ecoregions 35b, 35g, and 73 (Mississippi Alluvial Plain). In eastern Texas and Louisiana, Tertiary deposits are mostly Eocene clays, silts, and sands, with some Paleocene sediments to the west. Soils are loamy, well-drained, thermic Ultisols or moderately drained Alfisols, typically with sandy and loamy surface textures.

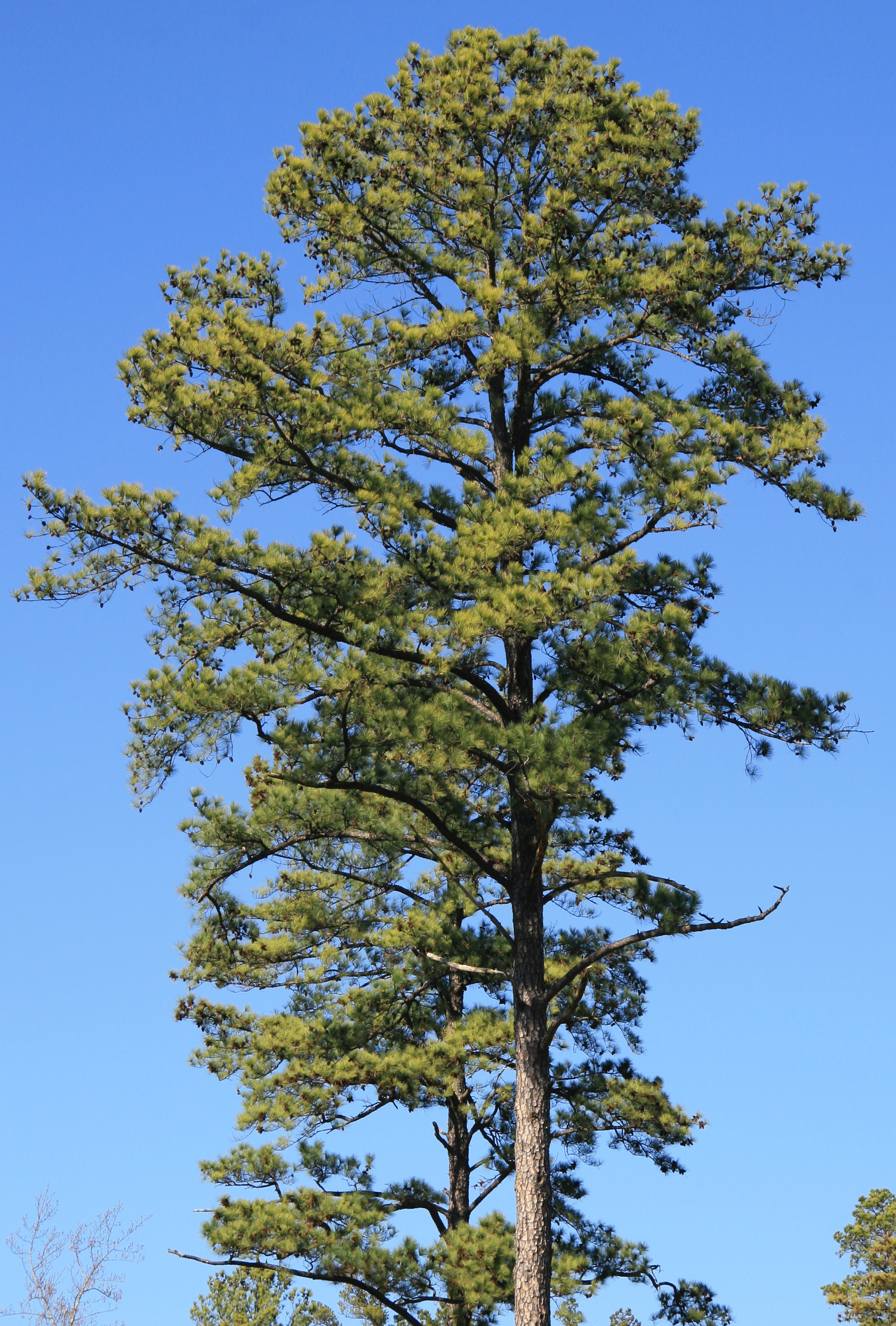
Loblolly Pine, Pinus taeda

In many areas of Ecoregion 35a, commercial pine plantations have replaced the native shortleaf pine–hardwood forest. Prominent native trees include shortleaf pine, loblolly pine, southern red oak, post oak, black oak, white oak, hickories, and sweetgum. American beautyberry, sumac, greenbriar, and hawthorn are common understory species. The sandier areas often have more bluejack oak, post oak, and stunted pines. Scattered, stunted, sandhill woodlands also occur. Grasses in the area include mid and tall grasses such as yellow Indian grass, pinehill bluestem, narrowleaf woodoats, and panicums.

The landscape is dissected by numerous small streams. Waters tend to be stained by organics, thus lowering water clarity and increasing total organic carbon and biochemical oxygen demand levels. Most streams have a sandy substrate and a forest canopy. Many do not flow during the summer or early fall. However, in sandhills, spring-fed, perennial streams occur; here, total dissolved solids, total suspended solids, alkalinity, and hardness values are lower than elsewhere in the South Central Plains. Water quality in forested basins is better than in pastureland. Oil production has lowered stream quality in the south.

Timber production is the dominant land use, along with livestock grazing, poultry production, and oil and gas activities. Major settlements in the region include much of Little Rock; El Dorado, Arkansas; Texarkana; Ruston, Louisiana; and Longview, Tyler, and Nacogdoches in Texas. Protected areas include Caddo Lake National Wildlife Refuge, Poison Springs State Forest, much of Sabine National Forest, and Sabine Wildlife Management Area.

=== Floodplains and Low Terraces (35b) ===
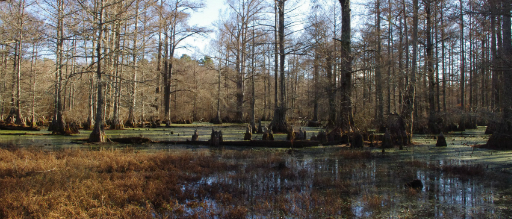
A cypress slough in Little River National Wildlife Refuge, in the Floodplains and Low Terraces (35b)

The Floodplains and Low Terraces of Ecoregion 35 comprise the western margin of the southern bottomland hardwood communities that extend along the Gulf and Atlantic coastal plains from Texas to Virginia. Region 35b is nearly level, veneered by Holocene alluvium, and contains natural levees, swales, oxbow lakes, and meander scars. Longitudinal channel gradients are low and are less than in the Ouachita Mountains (ecoregion 36). Soils include Alfisols, Inceptisols, Vertisols, and Entisols and are generally somewhat poorly drained to very poorly drained, clayey and loamy.

Large parts of Ecoregion 35b are frequently flooded. Forested wetlands are characteristic, but pastureland also occurs. Cropland is far less common than in the Red River Bottomlands (35g). Active, meandering alluvial river channels are dynamic systems, with erosion and deposition reworking the topography of levees, ridges, and swales. Overbank flooding, subsurface groundwater, and local precipitation recharge water levels in backswamps, pools, sloughs, oxbows, and depressions of this floodplain region.

Potential natural vegetation is southern floodplain forest as in the Mississippi Alluvial Plain (ecoregion 73); it is unlike the oak–hickory–pine forest of the higher, better drained, and lithologically distinct Tertiary Uplands (35a) and Cretaceous Dissected Uplands (35d). Water oak, willow oak, sweetgum, blackgum, American elm, red maple, Southern red oak, swamp chestnut oak, and loblolly pine are typical. Understory flora include holly, grape genus, poison ivy, crossvine, greenbriar, and a variety of ferns and mosses. Bald cypress and water tupelo occur in semi-permanently flooded areas. Spanish moss hangs in these trees, and floating aquatic plants often occur. On wet flats, backswamps, and swamp margins that are seasonally flooded, overcup oak, water hickory, water elm, sweetgum, green ash, and red maple occur. River banks may contain black willow, sycamore, and eastern cottonwood. Wetness and flooding present severe limitations for agriculture. A few of the higher terraces may have some pasture, but most of the region has deciduous forest land cover. Silviculture activities range from selective tree removal to clearcutting to, in some areas, replacement with pine monoculture. Reservoirs have inundated large areas of this habitat and have altered downstream hydrology. The bottomland forests provide important wildlife habitat with a high diversity of species.

Settlements of the Floodplains and Low Terraces include parts of Beaumont and Lake Charles; typically these narrow and wet regions are less developed. Protected areas include Pond Creek National Wildlife Refuge, Little River National Wildlife Refuge, Felsenthal National Wildlife Refuge, Upper Ouachita National Wildlife Refuge, Sabine Island Wildlife Management Area, and Trinity River National Wildlife Refuge.

=== Pleistocene Fluvial Terraces (35c) ===
The Pleistocene Fluvial Terraces are nearly level, poorly-drained, periodically wet, underlain by Pleistocene unconsolidated terrace deposits, and often covered by pine–hardwood flatwoods. The broad flats and gently sloping stream terraces are lower and less dissected than the Tertiary Uplands (35a), but higher than the floodplains of 35b and 35g. Soils are typically well to poorly drained Alfisols and Ultisols with loamy and sandy surfaces. Loblolly pine and oaks are common and are adapted to the prevailing hydroxeric regime; pastureland and hayland are less extensive.

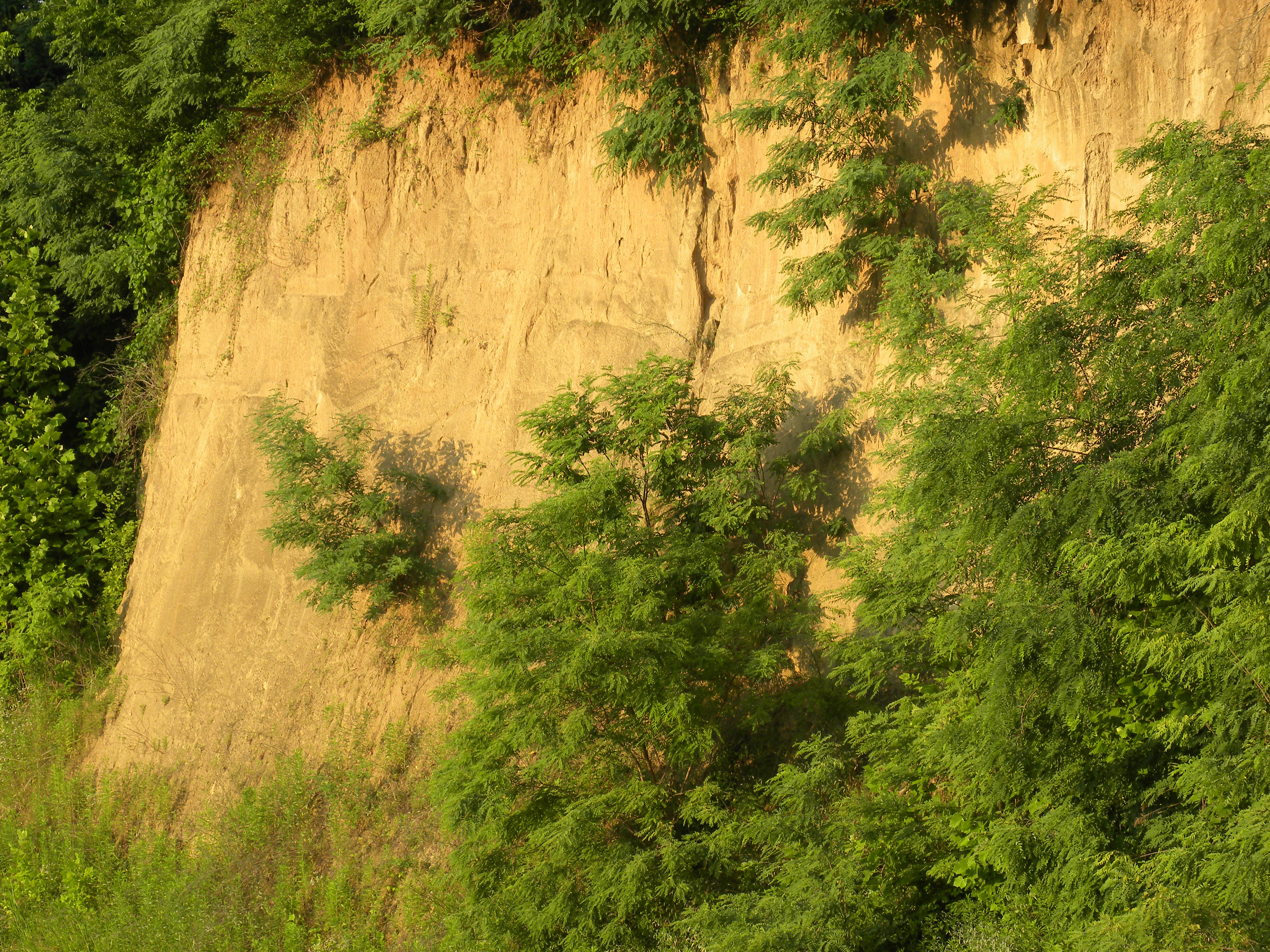
An example of loess deposits (at Vicksburg, in the Bluff Hills ecoregion, 74a)

A vertical sequence of terraces occurs. The lowest terrace is nearly flat, clayey, and has extensive hardwood wetlands. Higher terraces become progressively older and more dissected; they are dominated by pine flatwoods, pine savanna, prairie, or a mixed forest of pine and oak; flatwood wetlands are less extensive than on the lowest terrace. The mid-level terrace is veneered with windblown silt deposits (loess). Streams tend to be mildly acidic and stained by organic matter. They have more suspended solids, greater turbidity, and higher hardness values than the Tertiary Uplands (35a).

The southernmost piece of 35c, around Marksville, Louisiana, is a Pleistocene terrace with some similarities in soils and historical natural vegetation to that of the Lafayette Loess Plains (34j). The prairie has been converted to agriculture. Terraces are less extensive in Texas and Oklahoma, occurring mostly along the Red River, with some smaller terraces along the Sulphur River. In Texas, current land cover is mostly pine–hardwood forest, with post oak, Shumard oak, and eastern redcedar woods to the west. In Arkansas, loblolly pine is more common on the terraces than shortleaf pine, perhaps influenced by the seasonal wet-dry regime.

Settlements include White Hall, Arkansas; much of Pine Bluff, Arkansas; Sparkman, Arkansas; East Camden, Arkansas; Bastrop, Louisiana; Hermitage, Arkansas; Minden, Louisiana, and Ashdown, Arkansas. Protected areas include Cane Creek State Park, Seven Devils Wildlife Management Area (WMA), Crossett Experimental Forest WMA, and Lafayette WMA (Arkansas).

=== Cretaceous Dissected Uplands (35d) ===
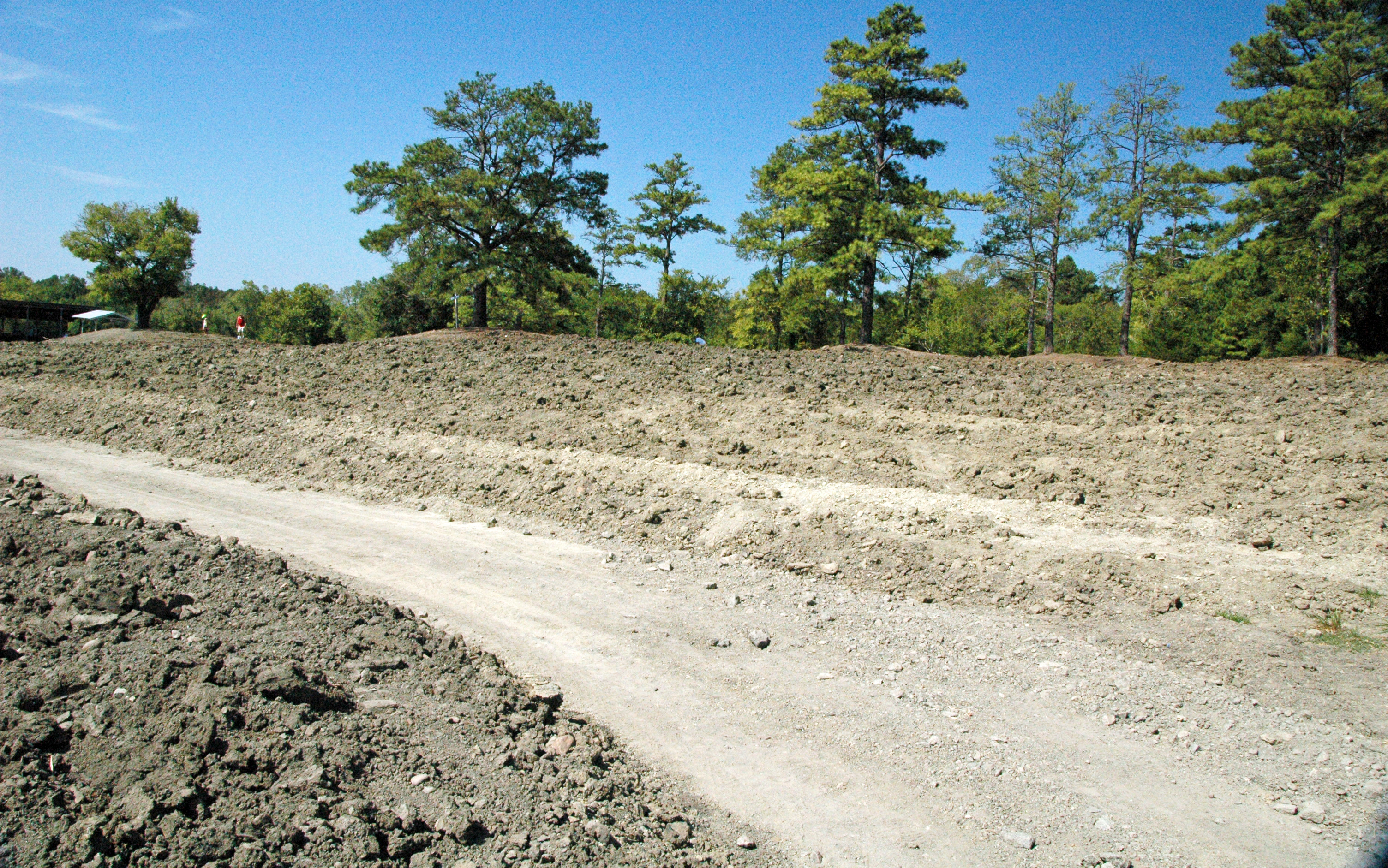
Rocky, Cretaceous dirt at Crater of Diamonds State Park, with pine–oak forest visible in background, in the Cretaceous Dissected Uplands (35d)

The nearly level to hilly Cretaceous Dissected Uplands ecoregion has a greater drainage density than other parts of the South Central Plains.

Native vegetation is largely oak–hickory–pine forest. Today, woods and pastureland are common. Water quality in forested watersheds tends to be good, and is better than in pastureland. Streams generally have lower total dissolved solids values and much lower total organic carbon values than the Tertiary Uplands (35a) and Pleistocene Fluvial Terraces (35c), although turbidity, total suspended solids, and hardness values are slightly higher. Longitudinal stream gradients and Ouachita Mountain influences are greater than in ecoregions 35a or 35c.

Water quality in forested watersheds tends to be good, and is better than downstream of pastureland. Surface waters usually have lower total organic carbon values and slightly higher turbidity, total suspended solids, and hardness values than the Pleistocene Fluvial Terraces (35c). Streams lying in the Muddy Boggy Creek and Blue River watersheds often originate in, and share many aquatic species with, the Arbuckle Uplift (29g); alkalinity, hardness, and conductivity values are influenced by local springs, and increase westward. Streams in the eastern part of the Cretaceous Dissected Uplands drain the more rugged, lithologically distinct Ouachita Mountains (ecoregion 36); aquatic flora and fauna assemblages are influenced by the Ouachitas and are distinct from western streams.

Settlements include (in Arkansas) Arkadelphia; Hope; Lockesburg; (in Oklahoma) Hugo; Bennington; and Caney. Protected areas include Crater of Diamonds State Park, some portions of Ouachita National Forest, and Boggy Depot Park.

=== Southern Tertiary Uplands (35e) ===
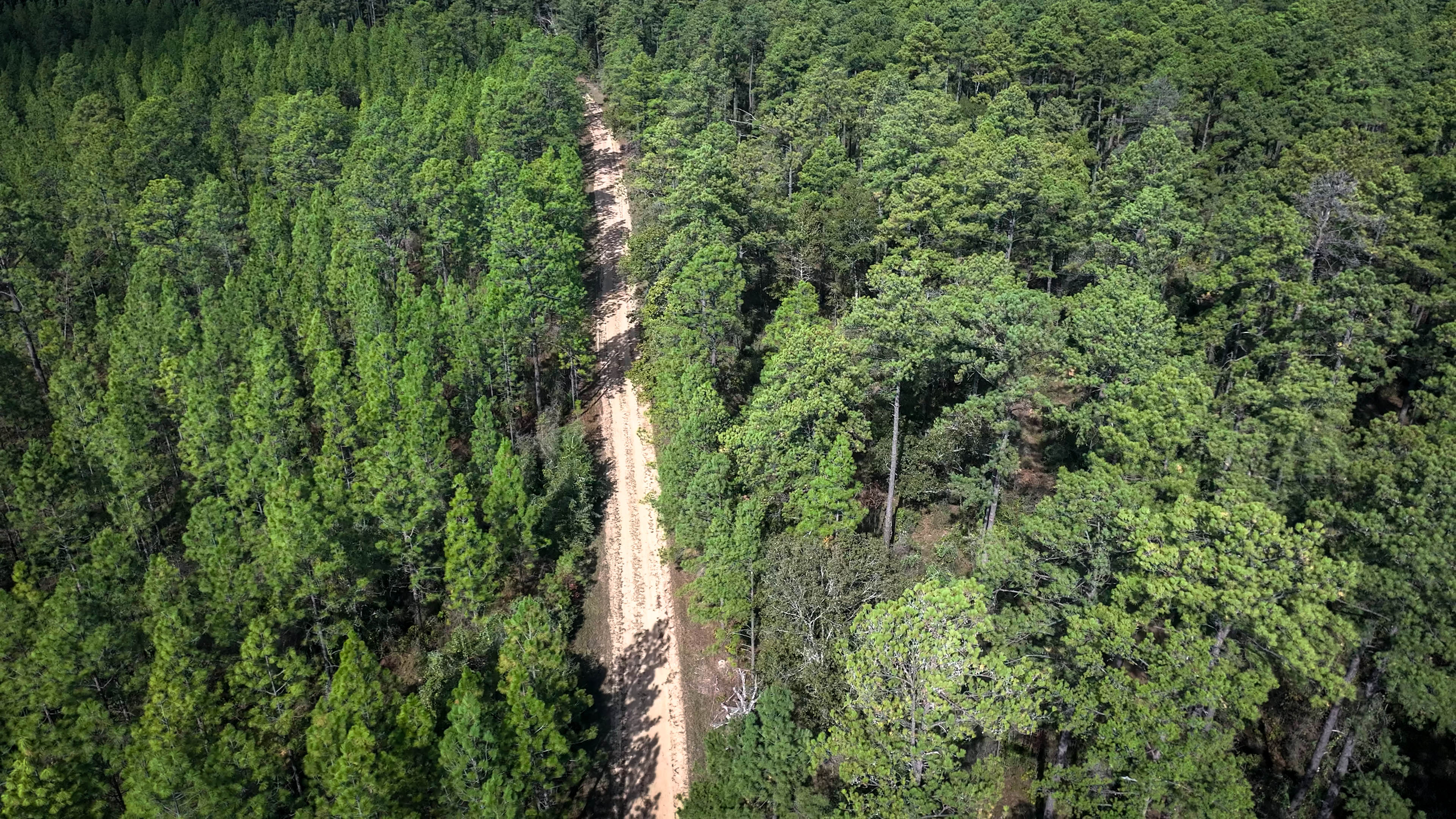
Kisatchie National Forest, Louisiana, located in the Southern Tertiary Uplands (35e)

The Southern Tertiary Uplands ecoregion of Texas and Louisiana generally covers the remainder of longleaf pine range north of the Flatwoods (35f) on Tertiary sediments. The region of Tertiary geology is more hilly and dissected than the Flatwoods (35f) to the south, and soils are generally better drained over the more permeable sediments. Soils are Ultisols and Alfisols with silt loam to loamy sand textures. The Pliocene-age to Eocene-age geology contains a variety of siltstones, sandstones, and calcareous and acidic clays.

Historical vegetation was dominated by longleaf pine–bluestem woodlands, but a variety of forest types were present, including shortleaf pine–hardwood forests, mixed hardwood–loblolly pine forests, and hardwood-dominated forests along streams. On more mesic sites, some American beech or magnolia–beech–loblolly pine forests occurred. Some small, scattered prairies with many rare plants are associated with areas of calcareous clay soils. Some sandstone outcrops of the Catahoula Formation have distinctive barrens or glades in Texas and Louisiana that contain several rare species. Forested seeps in sand hills support acid bog species including southern sweetbay, hollies, wax-myrtles, fetterbush, insectivorous plants, orchids, and wild azalea; this vegetation becomes more extensive in the Flatwoods (35f). Currently, the ecoregion in Texas and Louisiana has more pine forest than the oak–pine and pasture land cover more typical to the north in the Tertiary Uplands (35a). Large parts of the region are public National Forest land, such as Kisatchie National Forest. The Southern Tertiary Uplands ecoregion also covers the majority of Louisiana's longleaf pine range west of the Mississippi River.

Settlements include (in Louisiana) Chatham; Clarks; Jena; Pineville; Leesville; (in Texas) Jasper; Lufkin; and Conroe. Protected areas include Jimmie Davis State Park, Big Cypress State Park, Esler Field Wildlife Management Area (WMA), Kisatchie National Forest (four large tracts), Alexander State Forest, Fort Johnson North Wildlife Management Area (WMA), Clear Creek WMA, the southern portion of Sabine National Forest, Angelina National Forest and Bannister WMA, Davy Crockett National Forest, and Sam Houston National Forest.

=== Flatwoods (35f) ===
The Flatwoods ecoregion occurs on mostly flat to gently sloping Pleistocene sediments. The northern boundary is generally along the Hockley Scarp or the division between Pleistocene and older Pliocene/Miocene formations to the north. Soils are poorly to moderately well drained Alfisols and Ultisols with mostly silt loam textures. They are generally more poorly drained than many areas of the Southern Tertiary Uplands (35e) to the north, and tend to be less clayey than in the Southern Subhumid Gulf Coastal Prairies (34b) and Northern Humid Gulf Coastal Prairies (34a) to the south.

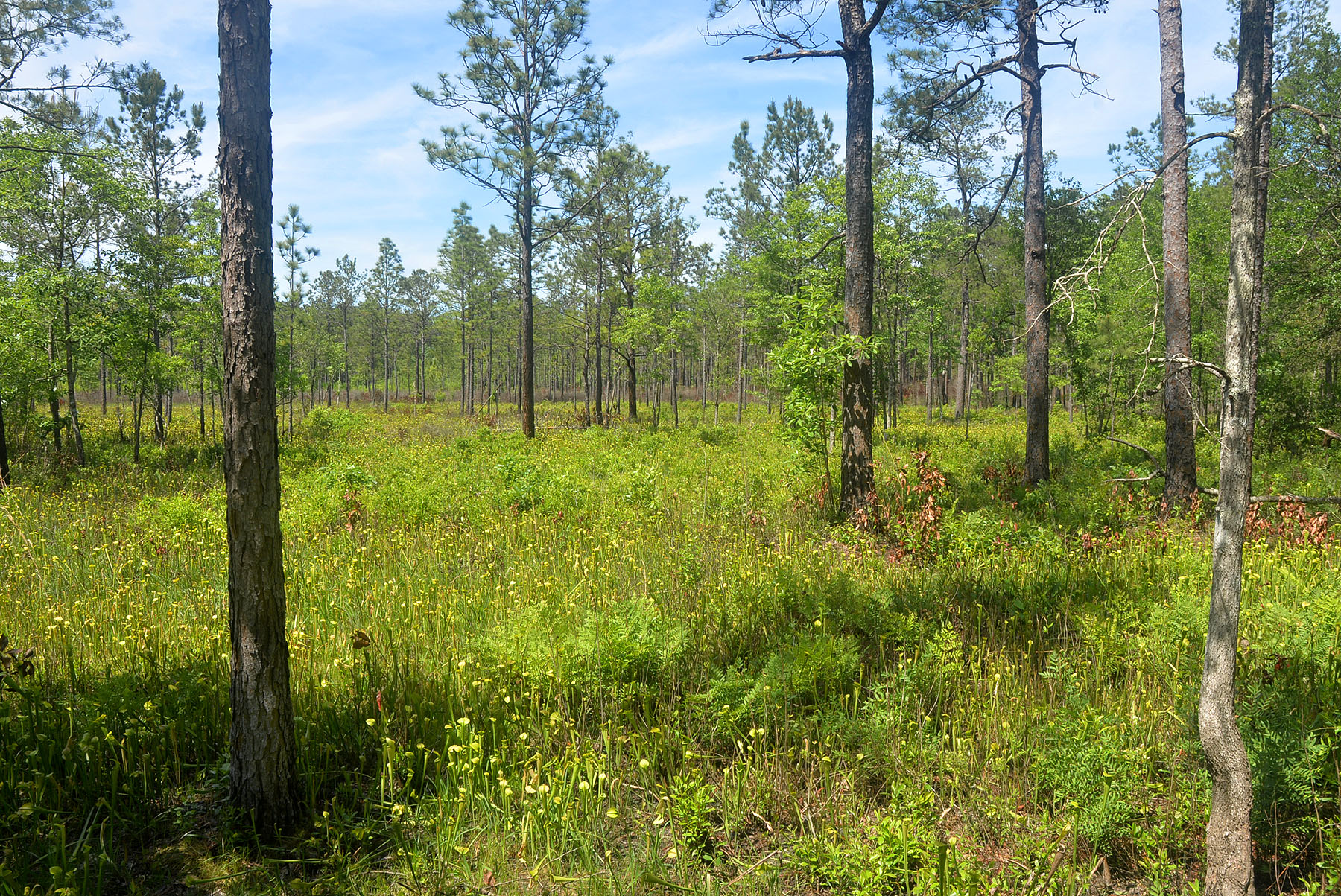
Pine savannah wetland in Big Thicket National Preserve, Flatwoods (35f)

This ecoregion once was dominated by longleaf pine flatwoods and savannas, but also supported other mixed pine–hardwood forest types. The longleaf pine community was characterized by longleaf pine over a great diversity of herbaceous species, with the structure and composition varying from the more open forests of the wet savannas to the more closed forests of the dry flatwoods. Savanna wetlands on the Montgomery Formation and prairie areas on the Beaumont Formation were most likely larger in the Flatwoods than in the Southern Tertiary Uplands (35e) and Tertiary Uplands (35a) to the north. The pine wetland savannas had scattered longleaf pine along with shrubs of sweetbay, wax myrtle, titi, and holly, and a diverse herbaceous layer of grasses, sedges, and, in some places, insectivorous plants and orchids. These wetland savannas are one of the rarest habitat types in Texas with only a few small fragments receiving any protected status. Other similar sites have been greatly modified or have become overgrown and less diverse.

Flatwood landscapes are characterized by pimple mounds, small hillocks that are abundant across the flats. On steep slopes, along streams and other areas where fire was less frequent, forests contained loblolly pine, sweetgum, white oak, southern red oak, willow oak, blackgum, and hollies. Although greatly reduced from its original extent, longleaf pine continues to characterize a significant portion of the area. Beech–magnolia was not extensive, occurring in narrow areas along some streams and mesic slopes.

This region is warmer, wetter, flatter, less dissected, and lower in elevation than the Tertiary Uplands (35a) and Southern Tertiary Uplands (35e) to the north, with a greater presettlement fire frequency. Streams are low gradient and sluggish. In the eastern part of the region near the boundary with the Red River Bottomlands (35g), more loess occurs, the landscape becomes more dissected, and it supports a mixed hardwood–pine forest. Almost all of the Big Thicket National Preserve is within this region. The area has a long history of modification, particularly by the lumber, railroad, and oil and gas industries that contributed to boom and bust cycles of development and occupance.

Settlements include (in Louisiana) Moss Bluff; DeRidder; (in Texas) Lumberton; Atascocita; Humble; and The Woodlands. Protected areas include Chicot State Park, Marsh Bayou Wildlife Management Area (WMA), West Bay WMA, Big Thicket National Preserve, and Kirby State Forest.

=== Red River Bottomlands (35g) ===
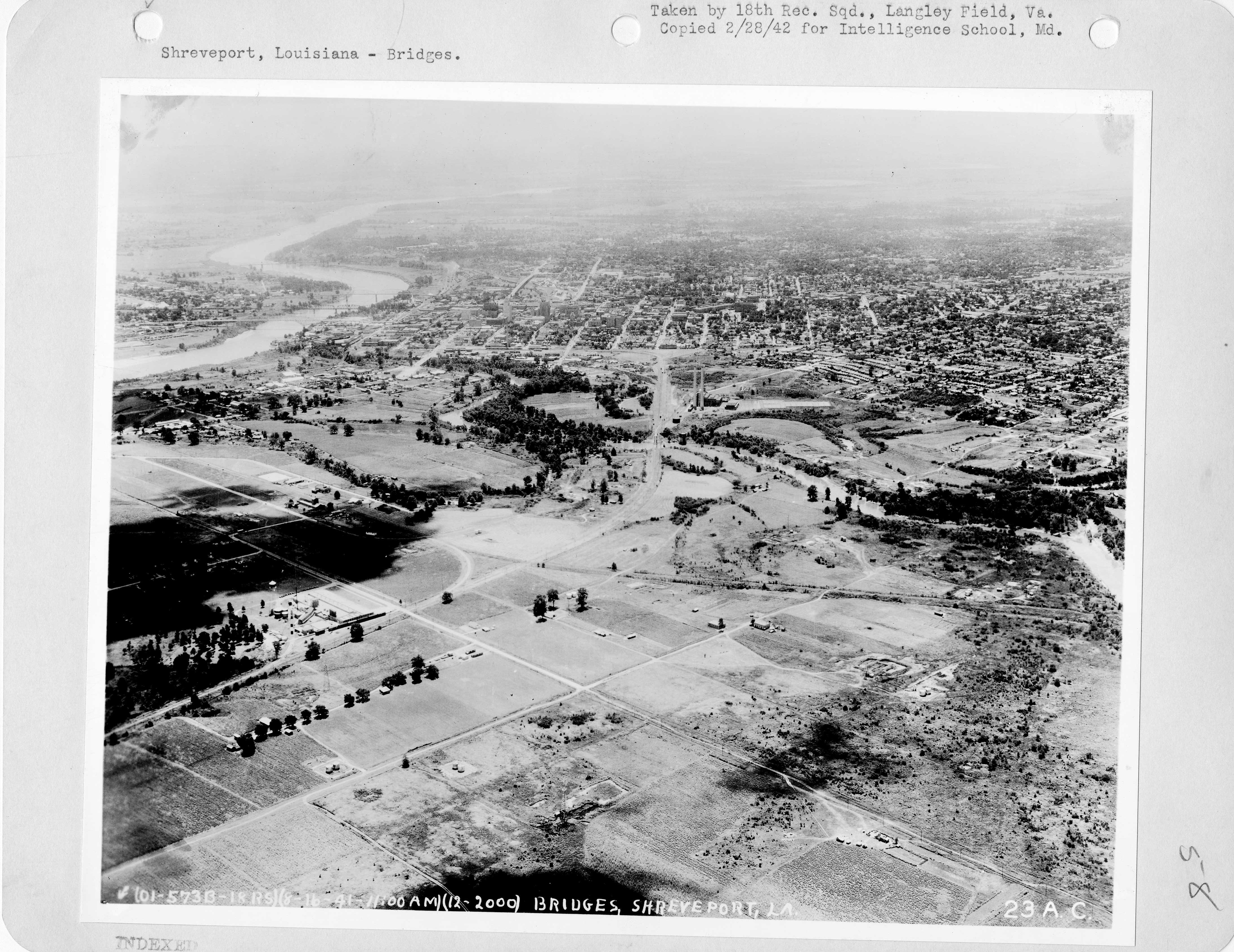
The Red River Bottomlands (35g): Shreveport and Bossier City, Louisiana, in 1941, looking Northwest, with the Red River at left

The Red River Bottomlands contain the floodplain and low terraces of the Red River within the South Central Plains (ecoregion 35). The region occurs in Texas, Oklahoma, Arkansas, and Louisiana, and includes the highly meandering main channel of the Red River, oxbow lakes, meander scars, ridges, and backswamps.

The Holocene alluvium associated with Red River deposition developed well to somewhat poorly drained Vertisols and Entisols with clayey and loamy, reddish-brown, neutral to calcareous surfaces. The lithology contrasts with the Pleistocene terrace deposits of Pleistocene Fluvial Terraces (35c), and the Tertiary sediments of the Tertiary Uplands (35a). Natural vegetation of the bottomland hardwood forests included trees such as water oak, sweetgum, willow oak, southern red oak, Nutall oak, honey locust, water locust, eastern red cedar, blackgum, blackjack oak, overcup oak, river birch, red maple, green ash, and American elm. There are also some plant distribution differences between the floodplains of ecoregions 35g and 35b. Western species, such as bur oak and Durand oak, were native to the Red River Bottomlands but were typically absent from the Mississippi Alluvial Plain (ecoregion 73).

Currently in the Red River Bottomlands, most of its natural woodland has been cleared for cropland and improved pasture, although some woodland still occurs in very poorly drained and frequently flooded areas. The broad, nearly level bottomlands are often dominated by agriculture, with more cropland than other floodplains of the South Central Plains (ecoregion 35). In Oklahoma, The main crops are soybeans, grain sorghum, alfalfa, corn, and wheat; In Texas, soybeans, sorghum, wheat, and cotton; and in Louisiana, cotton, soybeans, corn, wheat, and rice, with some sugarcane in the southern portion. The Red River carries high silt loads and is almost continuously turbid compared to other rivers of the South Central Plains, although silt load has lessened in Louisiana with the construction of the river's lock and dam system.

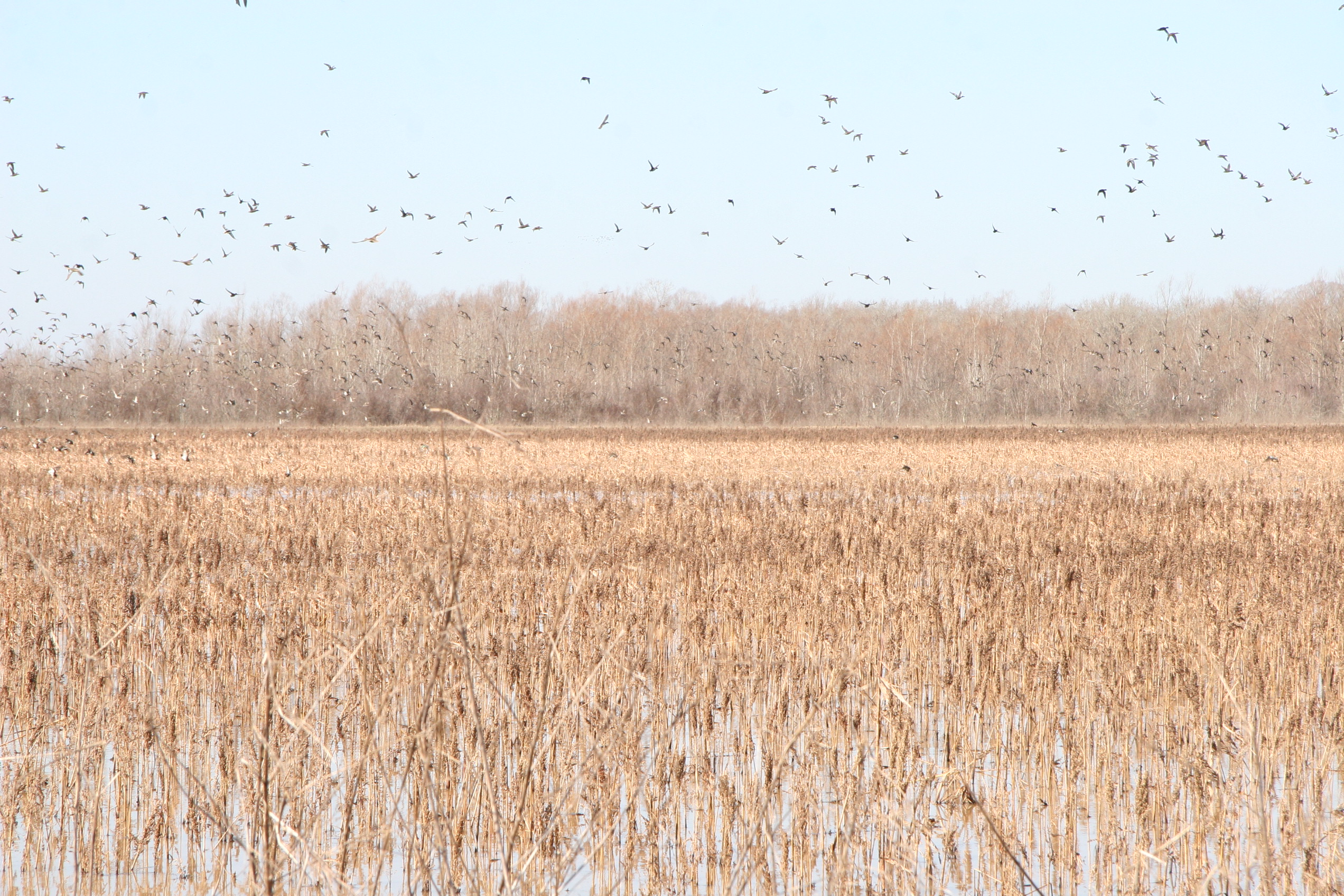
Grand Cote National Wildlife Refuge, in the Red River Bottomlands (35g)

The Red River historically carried high silt loads and was almost continuously turbid compared to other rivers of Ecoregion 35. With the construction of the lock and dam system throughout its extent in Louisiana, silt load has lessened. The Louisiana portion of the Red River Bottomlands shares similarities in natural vegetation and other biota, hydrology, and land uses with parts of the Mississippi Alluvial Plain (ecoregion 73).

Settlements, all in Louisiana, include Shreveport; the eastern part of Natchitoches; Alexandria; Cheneyville; and Bunkie. Protected areas include Spring Bank Wildlife Management Area (WMA), Soda Lake WMA, John Franks WMA, Red River National Wildlife Refuge (NWR), Loggy Bayou WMA, Bayou Pierre WMA, Elbow Slough WMA, Grand Cote NWR, Lake Ophelia NWR, and the Acadiana Conservation Corridor.

=== Blackland Prairie (35h) ===
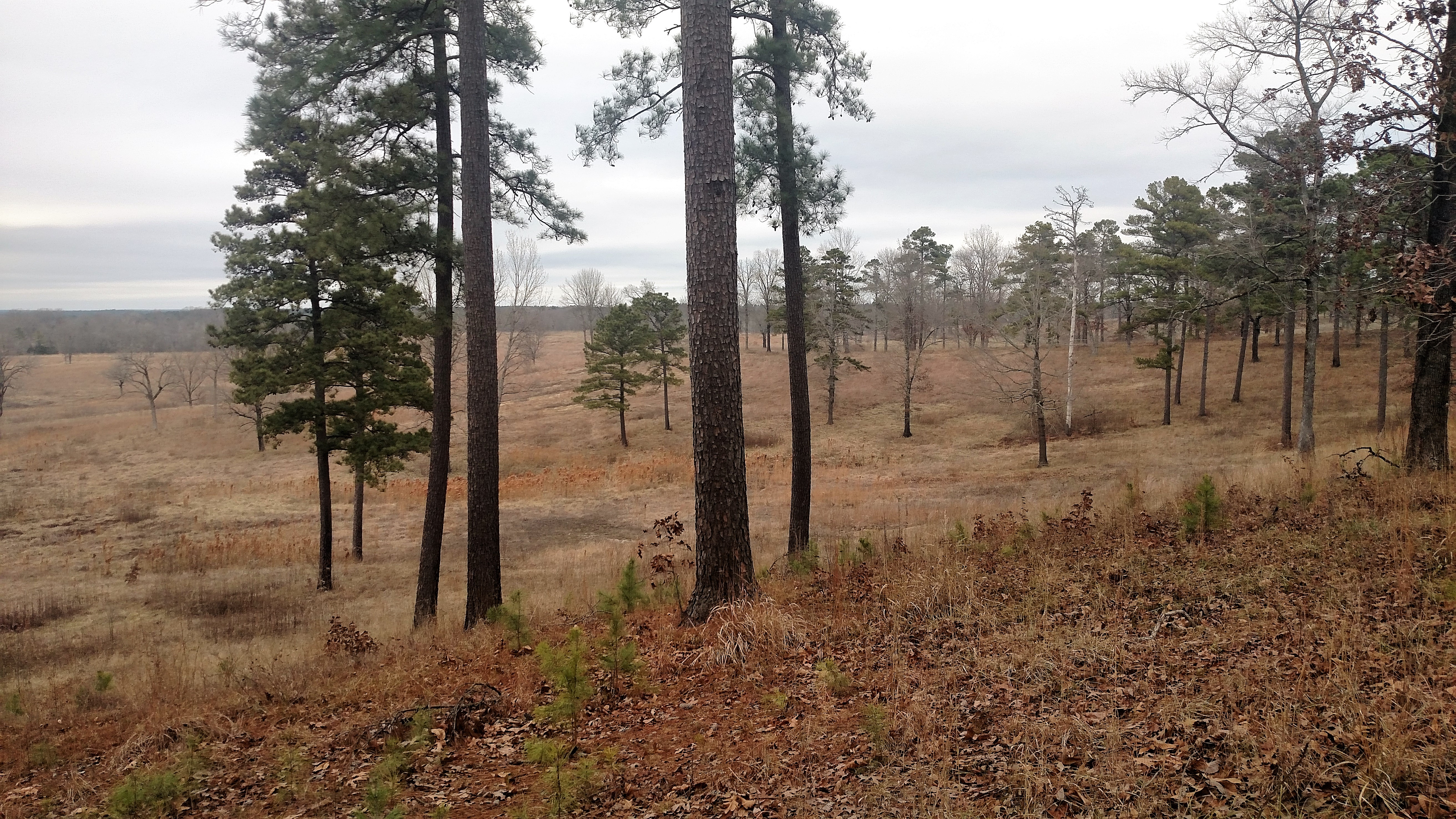
Terre Noire Natural Area WMA, Arkansas, in the Blackland Prairie (35h)

The level to rolling Blackland Prairie characteristically has dark soils derived from underlying Cretaceous marl, chalk, and limestone. Prairie was common or dominant during and shortly after the Hypsithermal Period in the middle of the Holocene Epoch. By the late 18th century, the Blackland Prairie was a mosaic of woodland, savanna, and prairies. Today, the fertile soils of the Blackland Prairie are mostly used for pastureland, woodland, and hayland. Only a few prairie remnants still occur and are mostly limited to the thin, droughty soils of cuesta scarps.

Settlements include Gurdon, Prescott, McNab, Ozan, Saratoga, and Rocky Comfort. Protected areas include Terre Noire Natural Area Wildlife Management Area (WMA), Ozan WMA, Hope Upland WMA, Rick Evans Grandview Prairie WMA, and Raymond Gary State Park.

== Conservation and threats ==
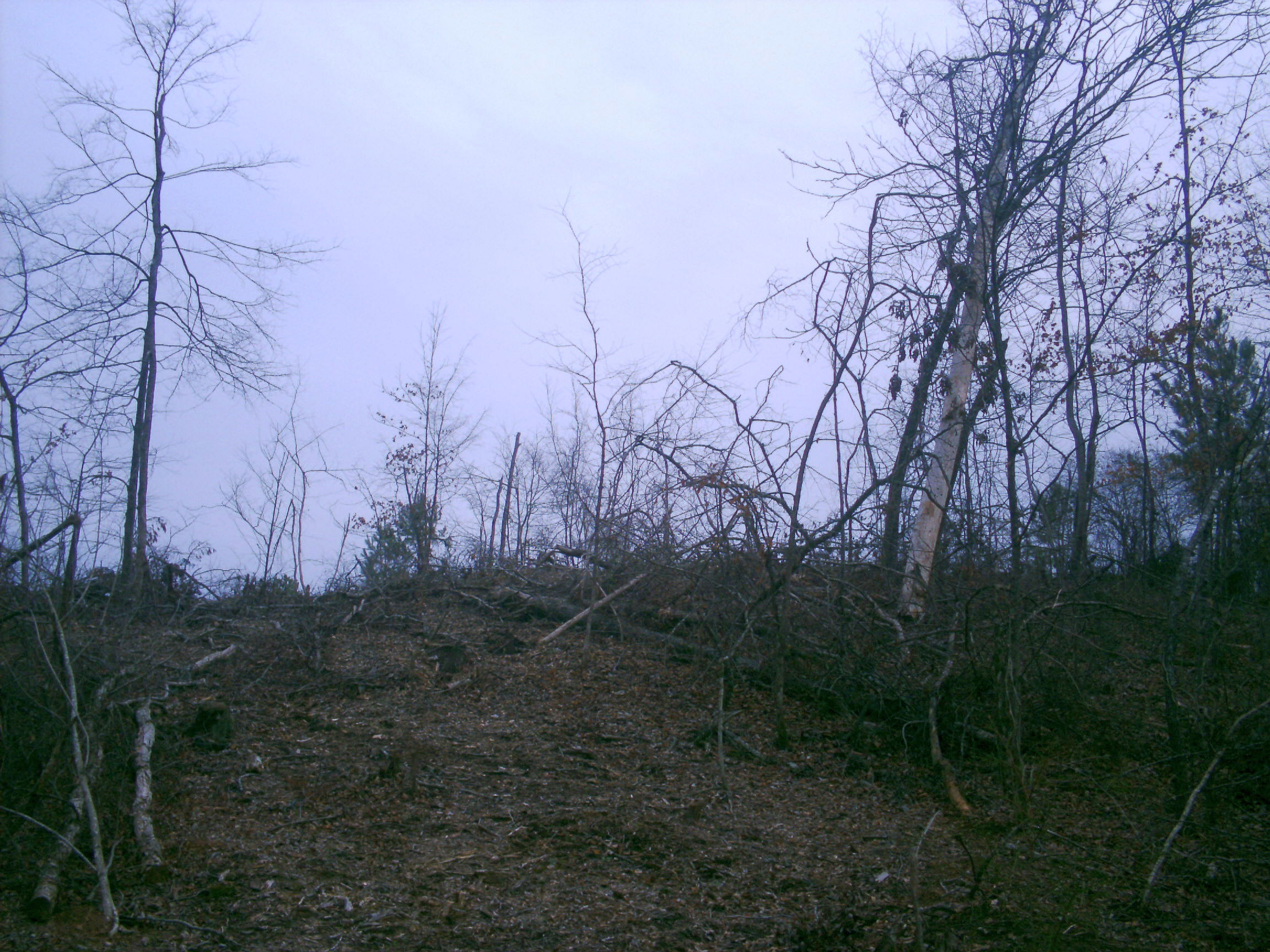
Newly cleared forest in East Texas. Most mature trees have been cleared and the layer of leaf litter, with decaying matter enriching the soil, has begun to wash away with recent rains.

The majority of the commercial timber growing and wood processing in the state of Texas takes place in the Piney Woods region, which contains about 50,000 square kilometres (12,000,000 acres) of commercial forestland.

=== National preserve ===
One National Preserve, the Big Thicket National Preserve, in the southern part of the Texas portion of the Piney Woods region, currently consists of fourteen named, non-contiguous units scattered across a wide area bounded roughly by Pine Island Bayou in Hardin County, Texas to the south, the Neches River bottom to the east (units on both sides of the river), the Trinity River to the west and Steinhagen Reservoir to the north. The preserve contains ten distinct ecosystems according to the National Park Service. Big Thicket National Preserve is one of two UNESCO Biosphere Reserves in Texas. The preserve has also been listed as a Globally Important Bird Area by the American Bird Conservancy. The preserve was established in 1974 under 16 U.S. Code § 698 - Big Thicket National Preserve "...to assure the preservation, conservation, and protection of the natural, scenic, and recreational values of a significant portion of the Big Thicket area in the State of Texas..." Since the preserve's inception, the Conservation Fund has helped to increase the amount of protected acreage by 33,000 acres (13,000 ha).

=== Protected and public lands ===
Federal Land

United States Department of the Interior, National Park Service

- Big Thicket National Preserve (113,114 acres), Texas

United States Department of the Interior, U.S. Fish & Wildlife Service

- Black Bayou Lake National Wildlife Refuge (5,300 acres), Louisiana
- Caddo Lake National Wildlife Refuge (8,493 acres), Texas
- Catahoula National Wildlife Refuge (25,162 acres), Louisiana
- D'Arbonne National Wildlife Refuge (ca. 17,000 acres), Louisiana
- Grand Cote National Wildlife Refuge (6,075acres), Louisiana
- Handy Brake National Wildlife Refuge (501 acres), Louisiana
- Little River National Wildlife Refuge (13,660 acres), Oklahoma
- Felsenthal National Wildlife Refuge (65,000 acres), Arkansas
- Little Sandy National Wildlife Refuge (3,802 acres), Texas
- Neches River National Wildlife Refuge (7,000 acres), Texas
- Overflow National Wildlife Refuge (ca.13,000 acres), Arkansas
- Pond Creek National Wildlife Refuge (27,000 acres), Arkansas
- Red River National Wildlife Refuge (established in 2002, to expand to 50,000 acres), Louisiana
- Trinity River National Wildlife Refuge (30,000 acres), Texas
- Upper Ouachita National Wildlife Refuge (49,948 acres), Louisiana

United States Department of Agriculture, U. S. Forest Service Managed under a multiple-use concept (by law), balancing between timber harvesting, grazing, minerals, soil and water, fish and wildlife, recreation, and public needs, with no single resource emphasized to the detriment of others.

- Sam Houston National Forest (163, 037 acres), Texas
- Angelina National Forest (153,179 acres), Texas
- Davy Crockett National Forest (160,000 acres), Texas
- Sabine National Forest (160,656 acres), Texas
- Kisatchie National Forest (600,000 acres in multiple discontinuous units), Louisiana
- Ouachita National Forest (1,800,000 acres in multiple discontinuous units), Arkansas and Oklahoma

(only two Ouachita N.F. units in southern Oklahoma are in the Piney Woods).

Arkansas (See also List of Arkansas state parks and list of Wildlife Management Areas in Arkansas)

- Arkansas Museum of Natural Resources
- Arkansas Oak Natural Area
- Beryl Anthony Lower Ouachita WMA
- Big Timber WMA
- Blevins WMA
- Byrd Lake Natural Area
- Cane Creek State Park
- Casey Jones WMA
- Coffee Prairie Natural Area
- Conway Cemetery State Park
- Crater of Diamonds State Park
- Crossett Experimental Forest WMA
- Cut-Off Creek Ravines Natural Area
- DeQueen Lake WMA
- Dr. Lester Sitzes III Bois D'Arc WMA
- Falcon Bottoms WMA
- Gum Flats WMA
- Hall Creek Barrens Natural Area
- Historic Washington State Park
- Hope Upland WMA
- Huttig Pine Flatwoods Natural Area
- Jenkins' Ferry State Park
- Kingsland Prairie Natural Area
- Lafayette County WMA
- Little River WMA
- Logoly Natural Area
- Logoly State Park
- Longview Saline Natural Area
- Lorance Creek Natural Area
- Marks' Mills State Park
- Miller County Sandhills Natural Area
- Mills Park Natural Area
- Millwood State Park
- Moro Bay State Park
- Moro Big Pine Natural Area/WMA
- Moro Creek Bottoms Natural Area
- Nacatoch Ravines Natural Area
- Ozan WMA
- Palmetto Flats Natural Area
- Poison Springs Natural Area
- Poison Springs State Forest
- Poison Springs Battleground State Park
- Provo WMA
- Rick Evans Grandview Prairie Nature Center & WMA
- Saratoga Blackland Prairie Natural Area
- Seven Devils Swamp Natural Area/WMA
- South Arkansas Arboretum
- Spring Bank WMA
- Stone Road Glade Natural Area
- Sulphur River WMA
- Terre Noire Natural Area
- Two Bayou Creek WMA
- Warren Prairie Natural Area
- White Cliffs Natural Area
- White Oak Lake State Park

Louisiana Department of Wildlife and Fisheries

- Acadiana Conservation Corridor Wildlife Management Area (2,285 acres)
- Alexander State Forest (ca. 8,158 acres)
- Bayou Pierre Wildlife Management Area (3,753 acres)
- Ben Lilly Conservation Area (247 acres)
- Bodcau Wildlife Management Area (33,766 acres)
- Boeuf Wildlife Management Area (51,110 acres)
- Bussey Brake Wildlife Management Area (2,614 acres)
- Camp Beauregard Wildlife Management Area (12,500acres)
- Chemin-A-Haut State Park (503 acres)
- Chicot State Park (6,400 acres)
- Clear Creek Wildlife Management Area (52,559 acres)
- Dewey W. Wills Wildlife Management Area (63,984 acres)
- Elbow Slough Wildlife Management Area (160 acres)
- J.C. "Sonny" Gilbert Wildlife Management Area (7,524 acres)
- Jimmie Davis State Park (294 acres)
- Lake Bistineau State Park (? acres)
- Lake Claiborne State Park (643 acres)
- Lake D'Arbonne State Park ( 655 acres)
- Little River Grant Wildlife Management Area (6,045 acres)
- Loggy Bayou Wildlife Management Area (6,558 acres)
- Louisiana State Arboretum (>600 acres)
- Marsh Bayou Wildlife Management Area (655 acres)
- North Toledo Bend State Park (>900 acres)
- Peason Ridge Wildlife Management Area (74,309 acres)
- Russell Sage Wildlife Management Area (38,213 acres)
- Sam Houston Jones State Park (1,087 acres)
- Sabine Island Wildlife Management Area (8,343)
- Soda Lake State Wildlife Management Area (2,500 acres)
- South Toledo Bend State Park (ca. 1,000 acres)
- Walnut Hill Wildlife Management Area (595 acres)

Oklahoma

- Beavers Bend State Park (1,300 acres)
- Hugo Lake State Park (289 acres) Previously Kiamichi State Park
- Hochatown State Park ( acres)
- McCurtain County Wilderness Area (ca. 14,000 acres)
- McGee Creek State Park (2,600 acres)
- McGee Creek Natural Scenic State Recreation Area (10,000)
- Raymond Gary State Park (263 acres)
- Red Slough Wildlife Management Area (5,814 acre)

Texas Parks and Wildlife Department (Some Texas Wildlife Management Areas leased from the U. S. Forest Service and located within National Forest are not included here)

- Alazan Bayou Wildlife Management Area (2,740 acres)
- Angelina-Neches/Dam B Wildlife Management Area (12,636 acres)
- Atlanta State Park (1,475 acres)
- Big Lake Bottom Wildlife Management Area (3,894 acres)
- Caddo Lake Wildlife Management Area (8,005 acres)
- Caddo Lake State Park (483 acres)
- Daingerfield State Park (507 acres)
- Huntsville State Park (2,083 acres)
- Lake Bob Sandlin State Park ( 640 acres)
- Lake Livingston State Park (635 acres)
- Martin Creek Lake State Park (286 acres)
- Martin Dies, Jr. State Park (705 acres)
- Mission Tejas State Park (659 acres)
- North Toledo Bend Wildlife Management Area (3,650 acres)
- Old Sabine Bottom Wildlife Management Area (5,727 acres)
- Sabine River Authority Wildlife Management Area (8,062 acres)
- Tyler State Park (985.5 acres)
- Village Creek State Park (2,466 acres)
- White Oak Creek Wildlife Management Area (25,777 acres)

== Folklore ==
The Piney Woods Region of the four state area is a noted area for Bigfoot (Sasquatch) sightings; with many legends dating back to pre European settlement. One such noted legend is the story of the Fouke Monster of Southern Arkansas; documented in the 1972 film The Legend of Boggy Creek. The area according to references lists this area to be the third highest in North America for these such sightings.

Melanistic (black) cougars, another probable cryptid, have been noted by residents.

== Gallery ==
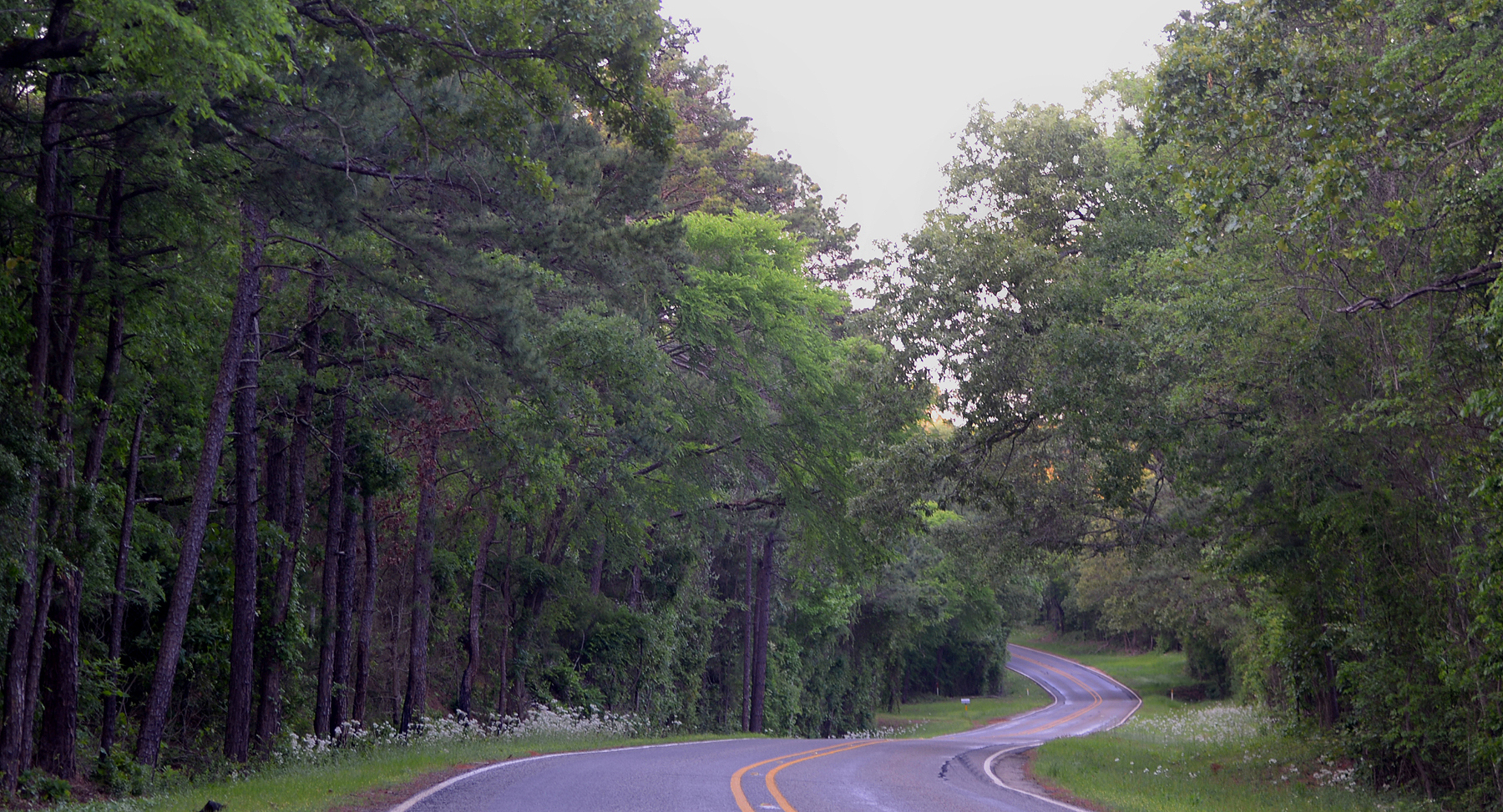
Farm to Market Road 315, Anderson County, Texas (April 2017)

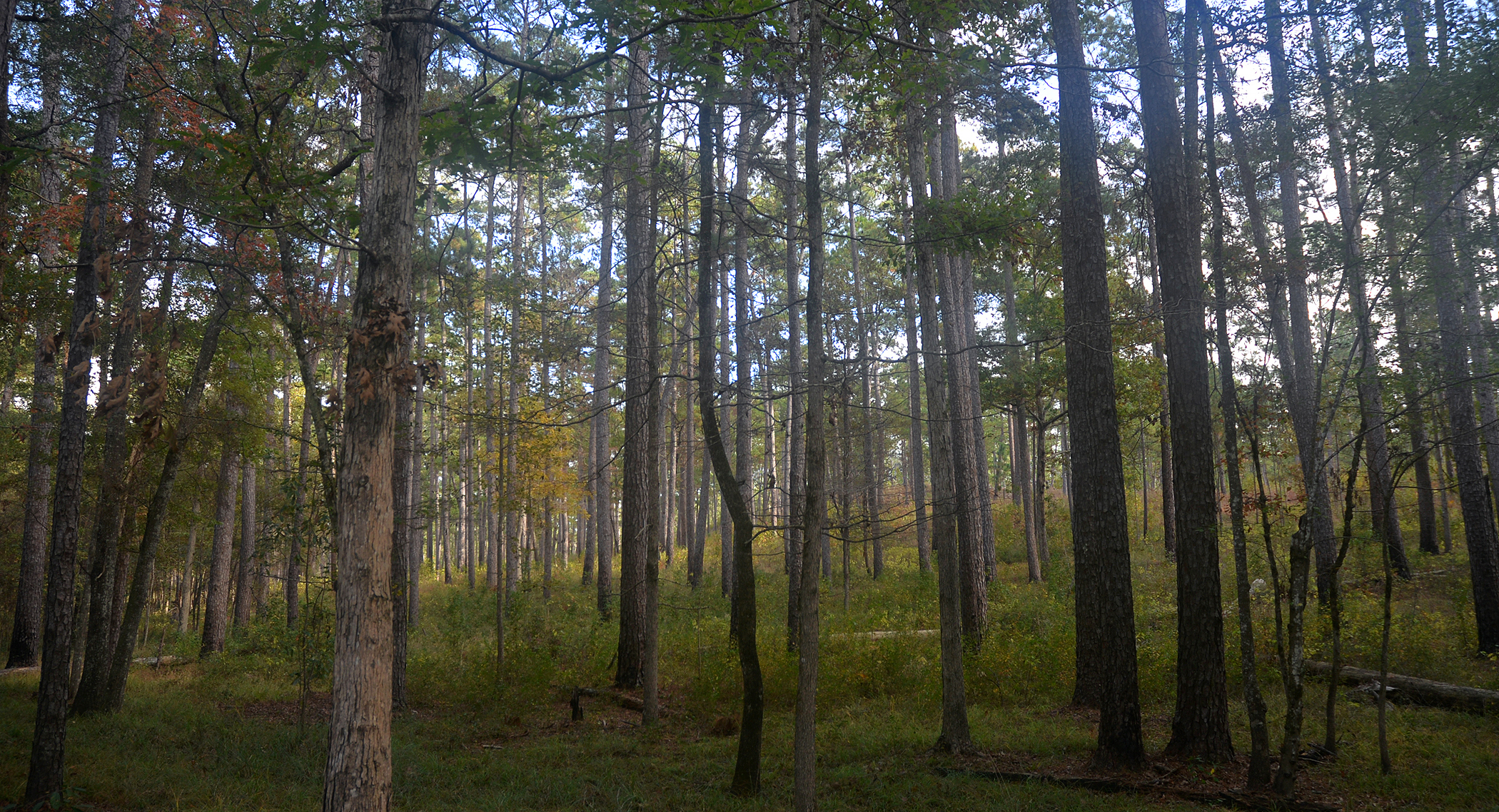
Angelina National Forest, Angelina County, Texas (November 2020)

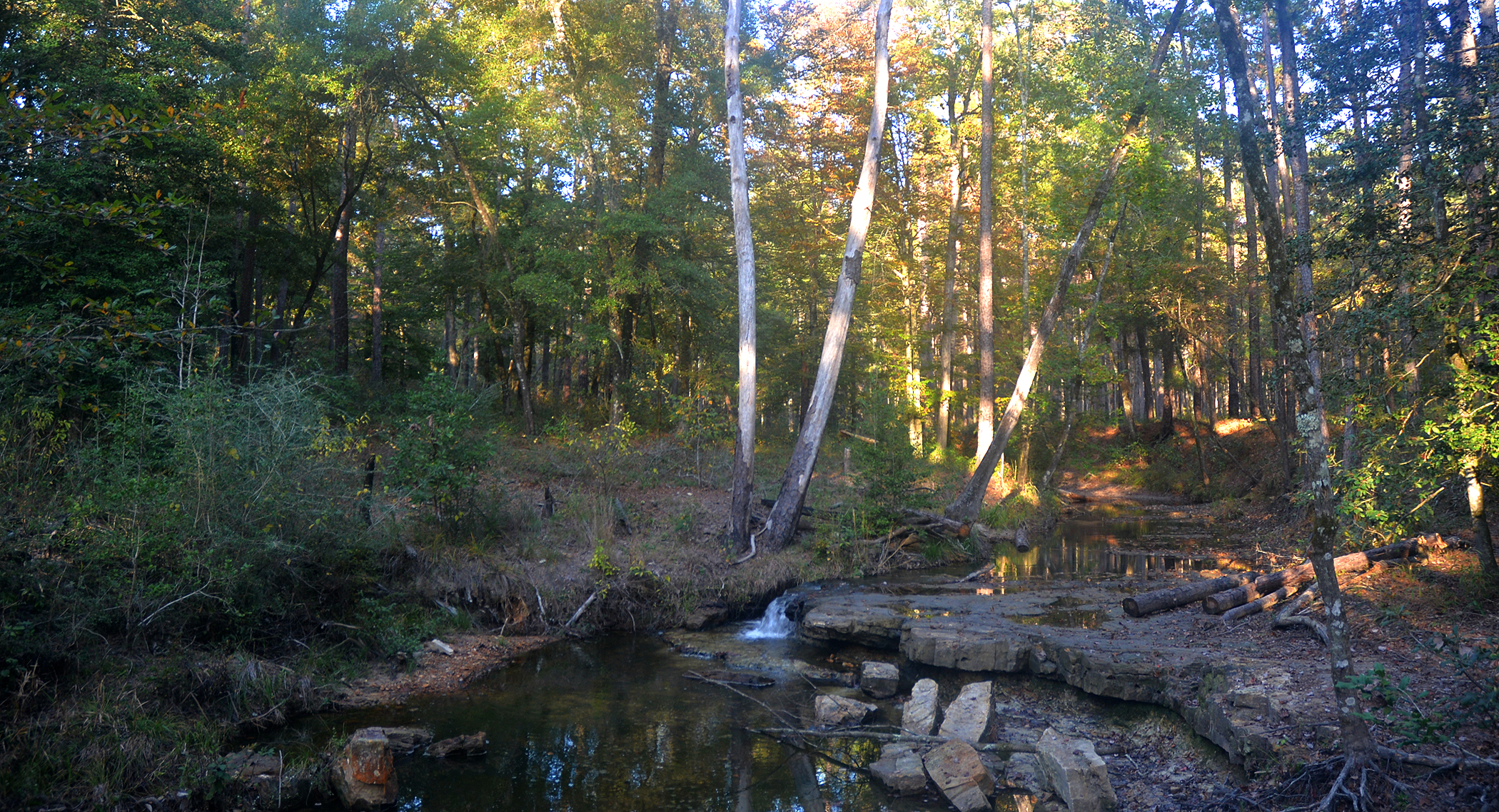
Angelina National Forest, Angelina County, Texas, (November 2020)

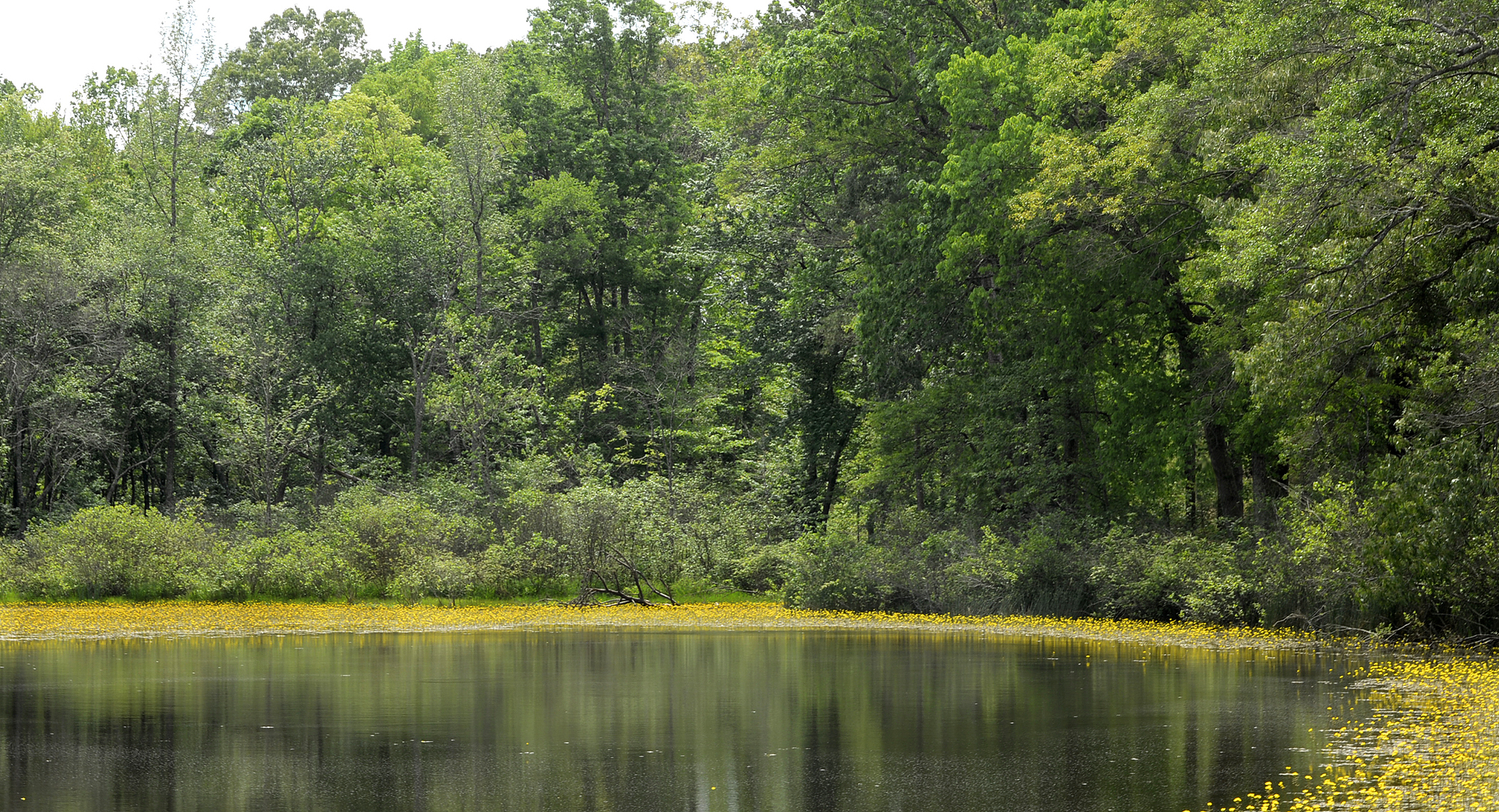
Bladderwort (Utricularia sp.) in bloom, Cass County, Texas, (April 2017)

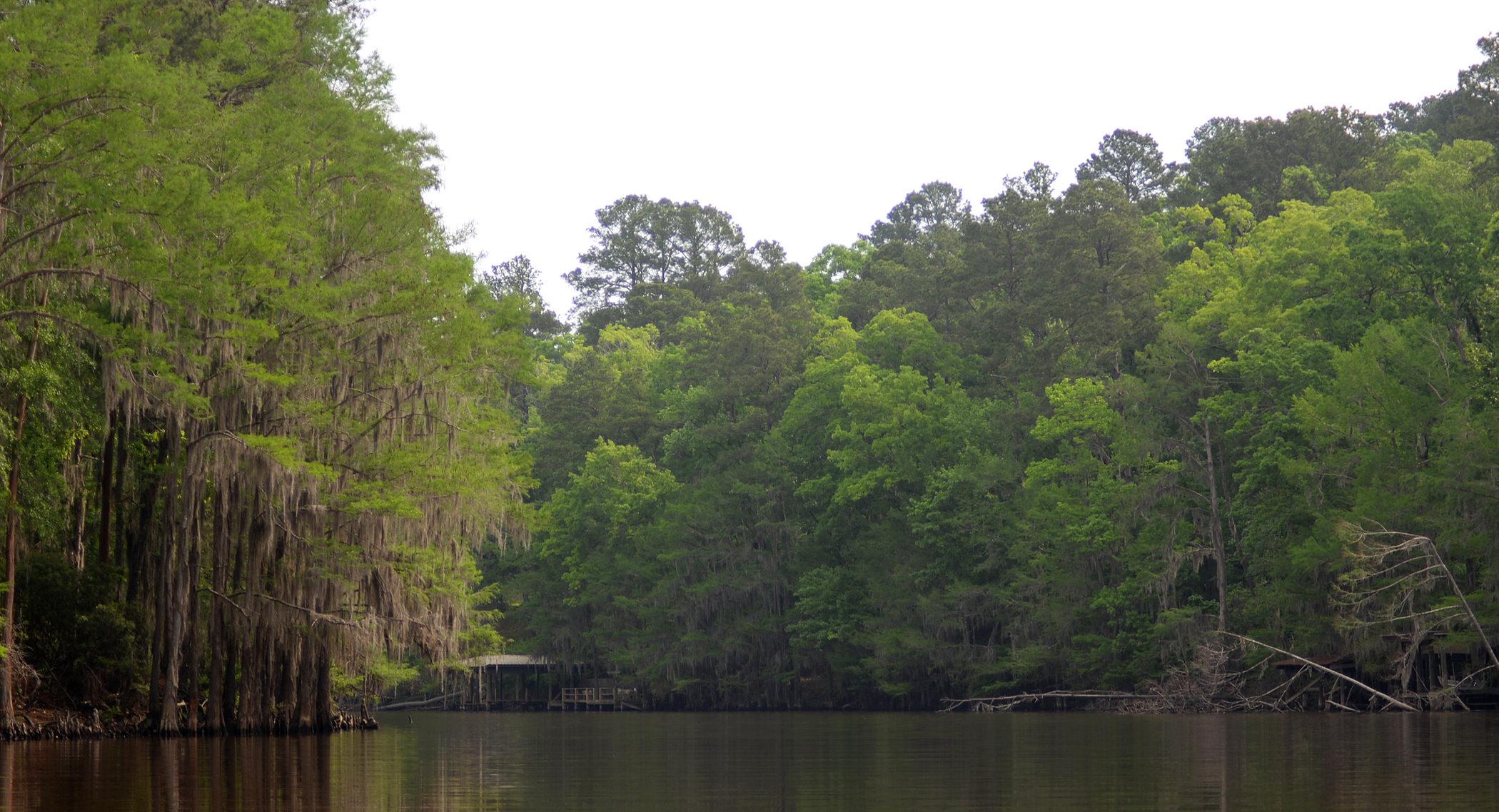
Big Cypress Bayou, Caddo Lake State Park, Harrison County, Texas, (April 2017)

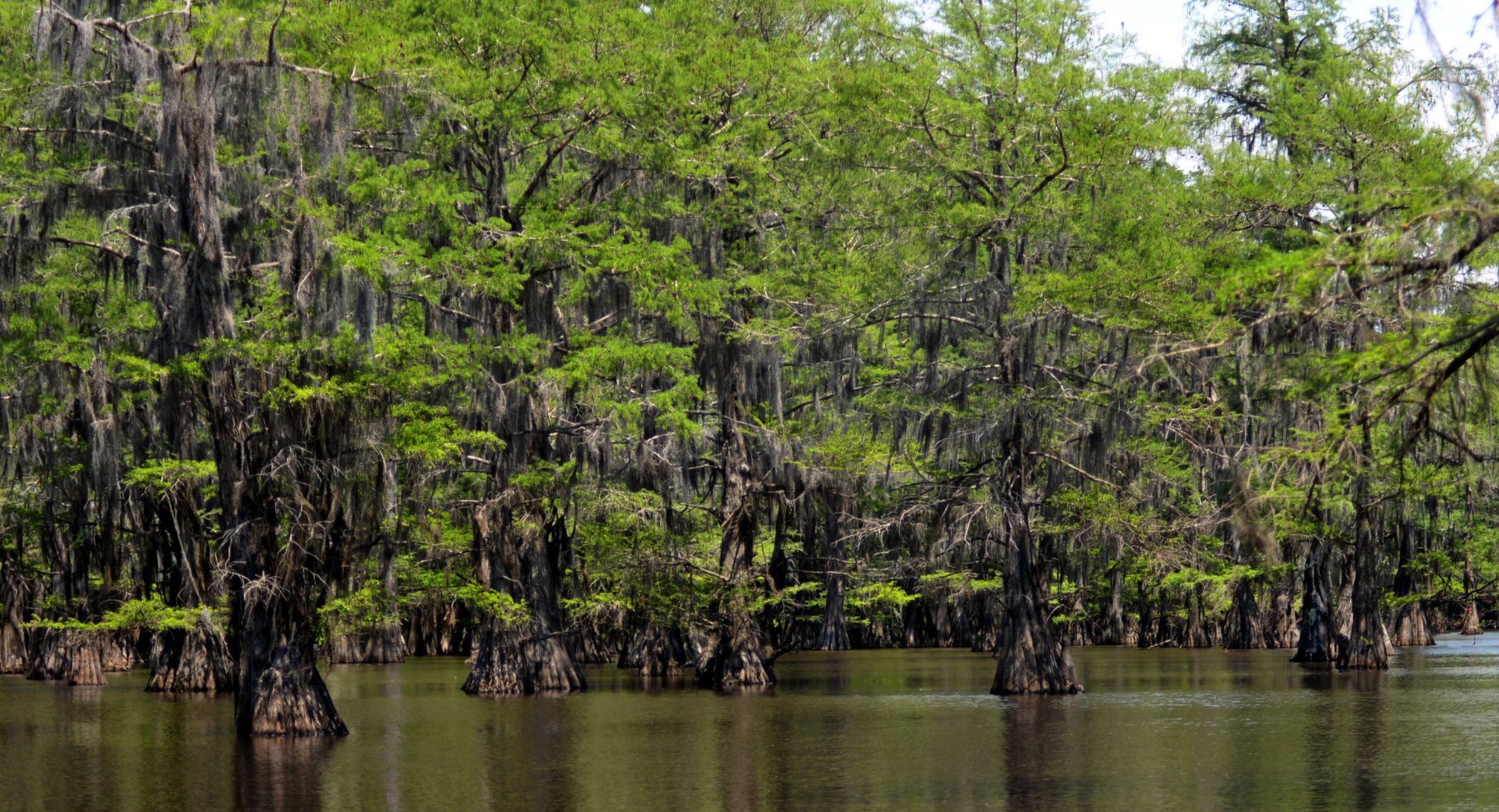
Bald cypress (Taxodium distichum), Caddo Lake State Park, Harrison County, Texas (April 2017)

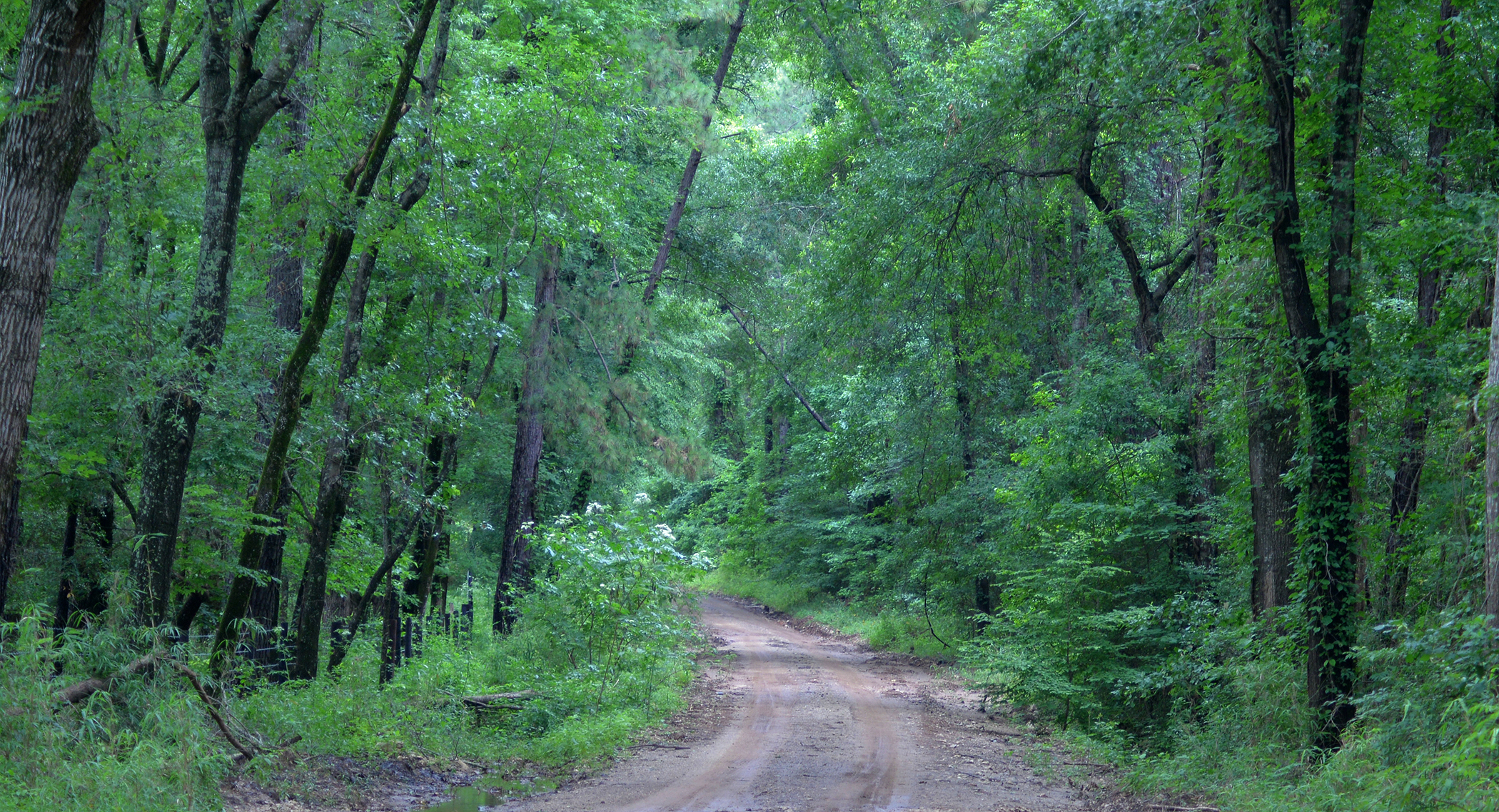
Davy Crockett National Forest, Houston County, Texas, USA (May 2019)

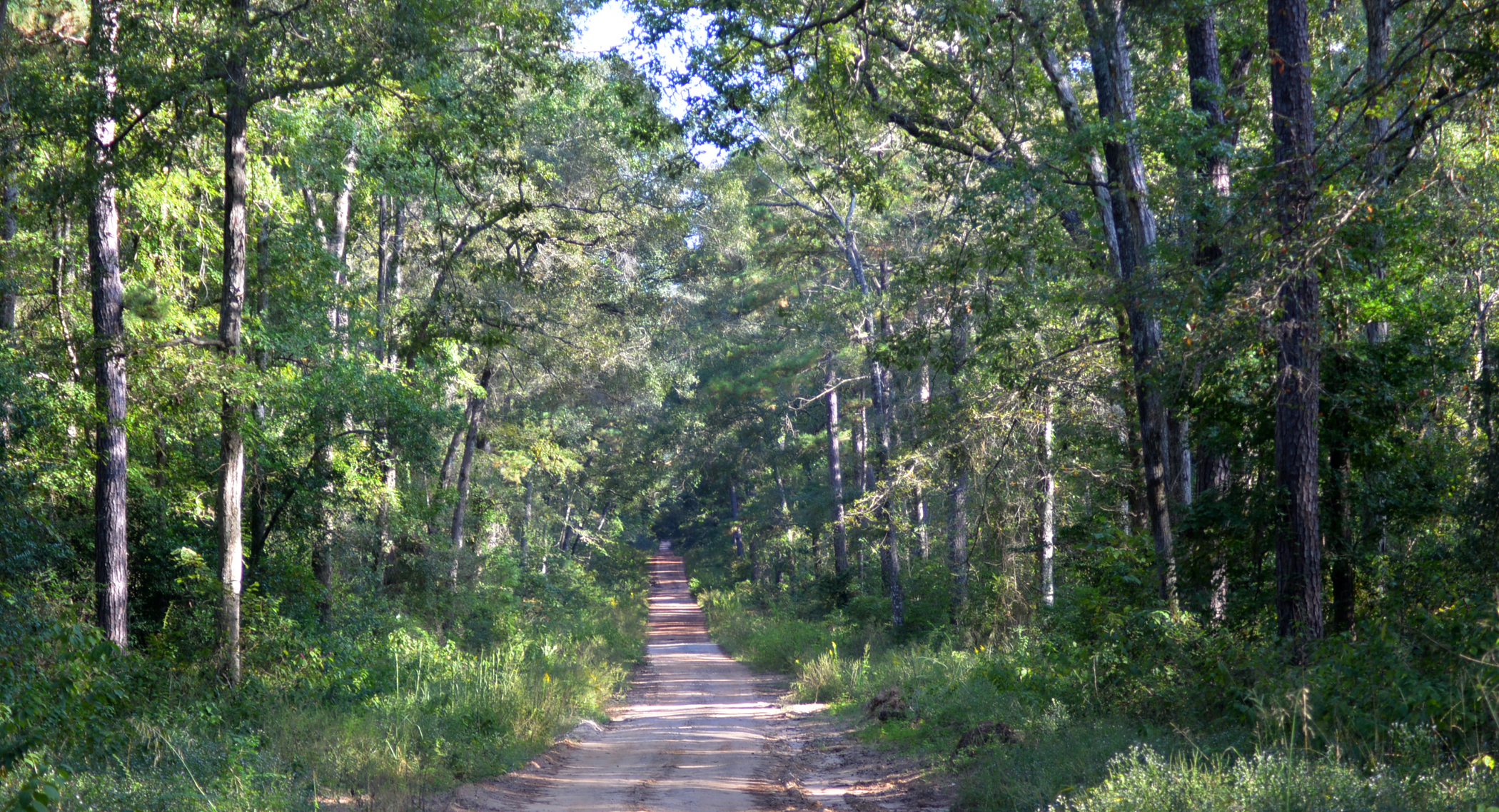
Sam Houston National Forest, San Jacinto County, Texas (October 2017)

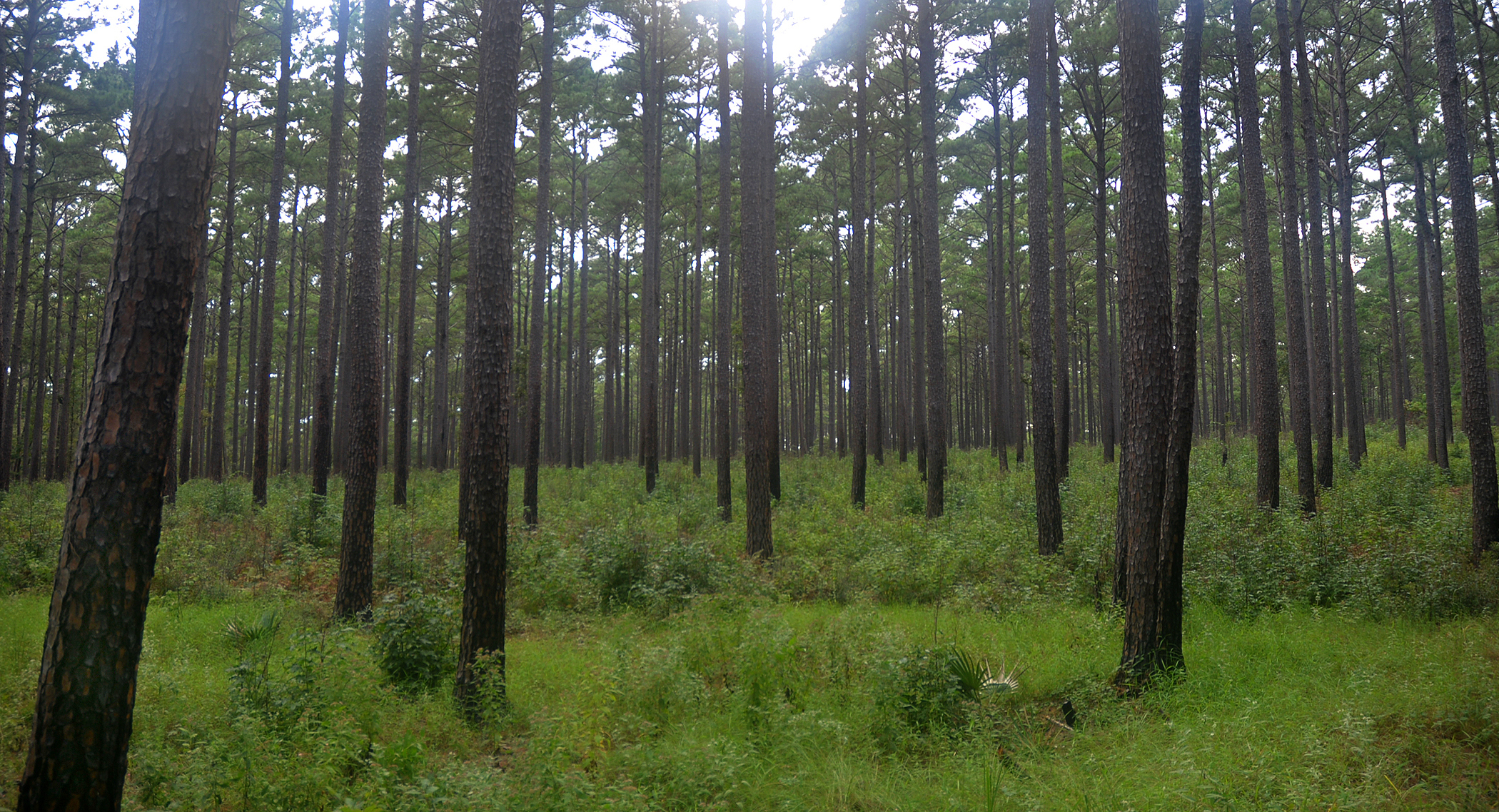
Longleaf pine (Pinus palustris), Sam Houston National Forest, Walker County, Texas (September 2020)

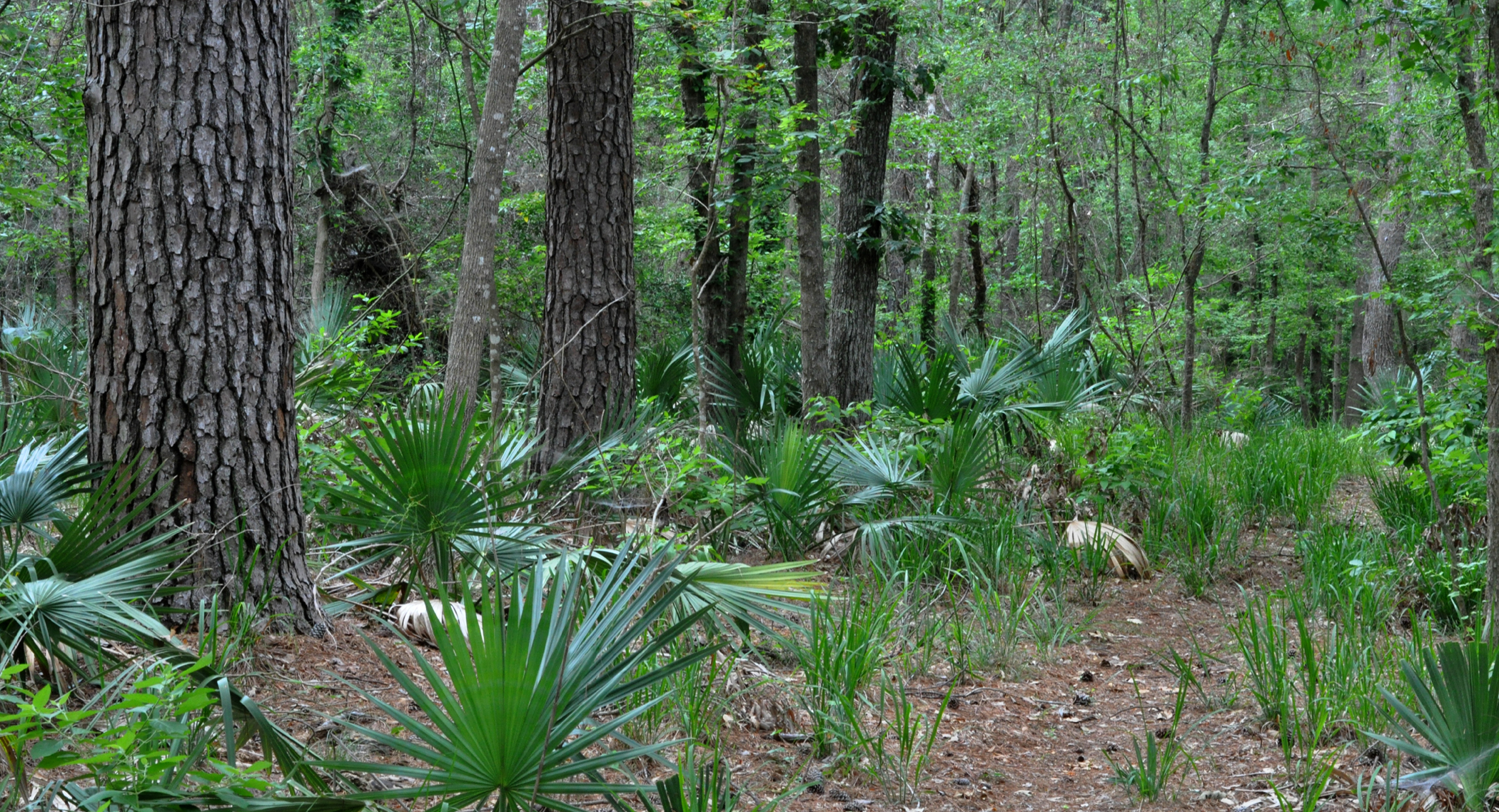
Dwarf palmettos (Sabal minor), Sam Houston National Forest, Walker County, Texas (May 2012)

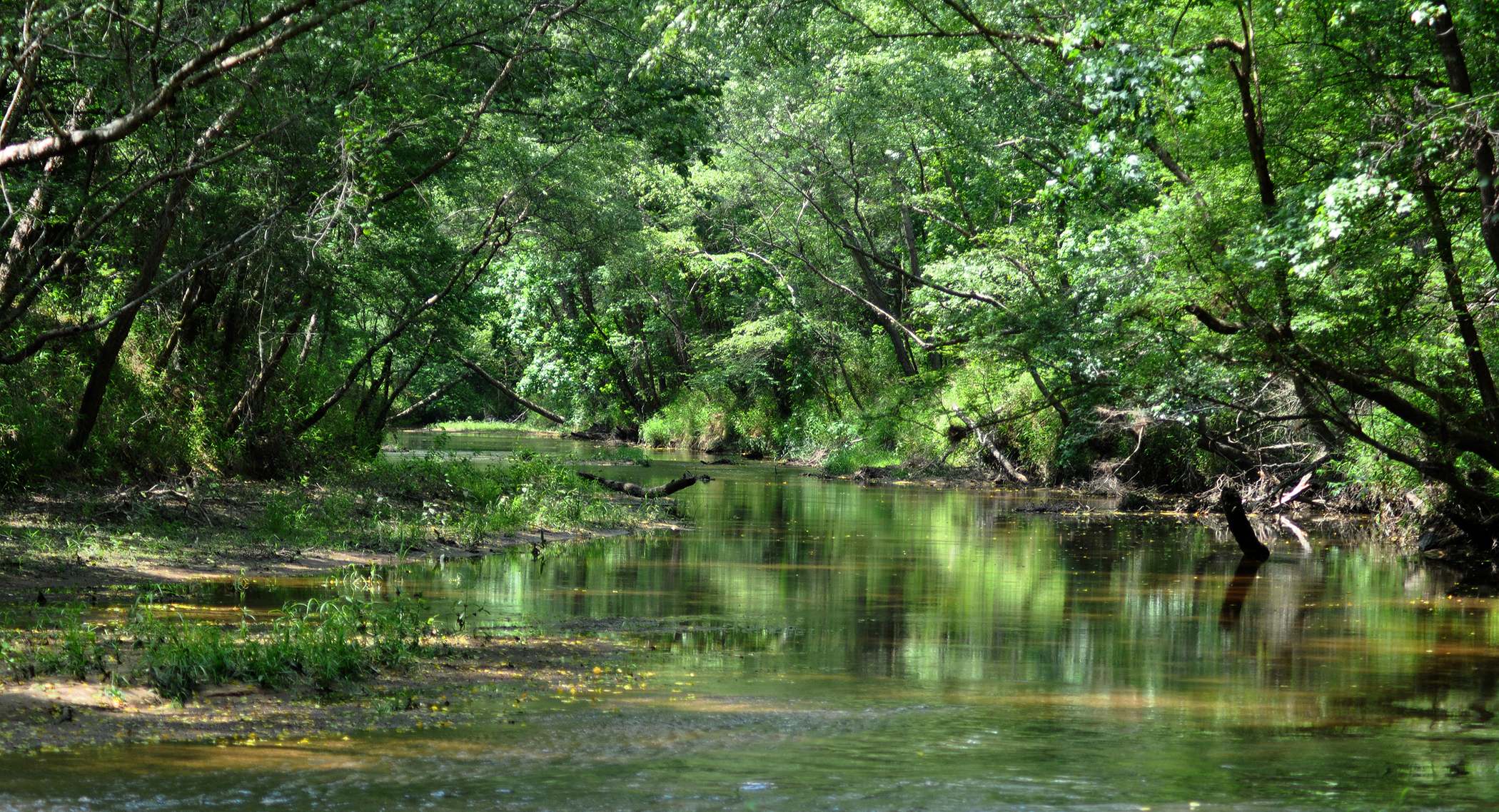
Peach Creek, Lake Houston Wilderness Park, Montgomery County, Texas (May 2013)

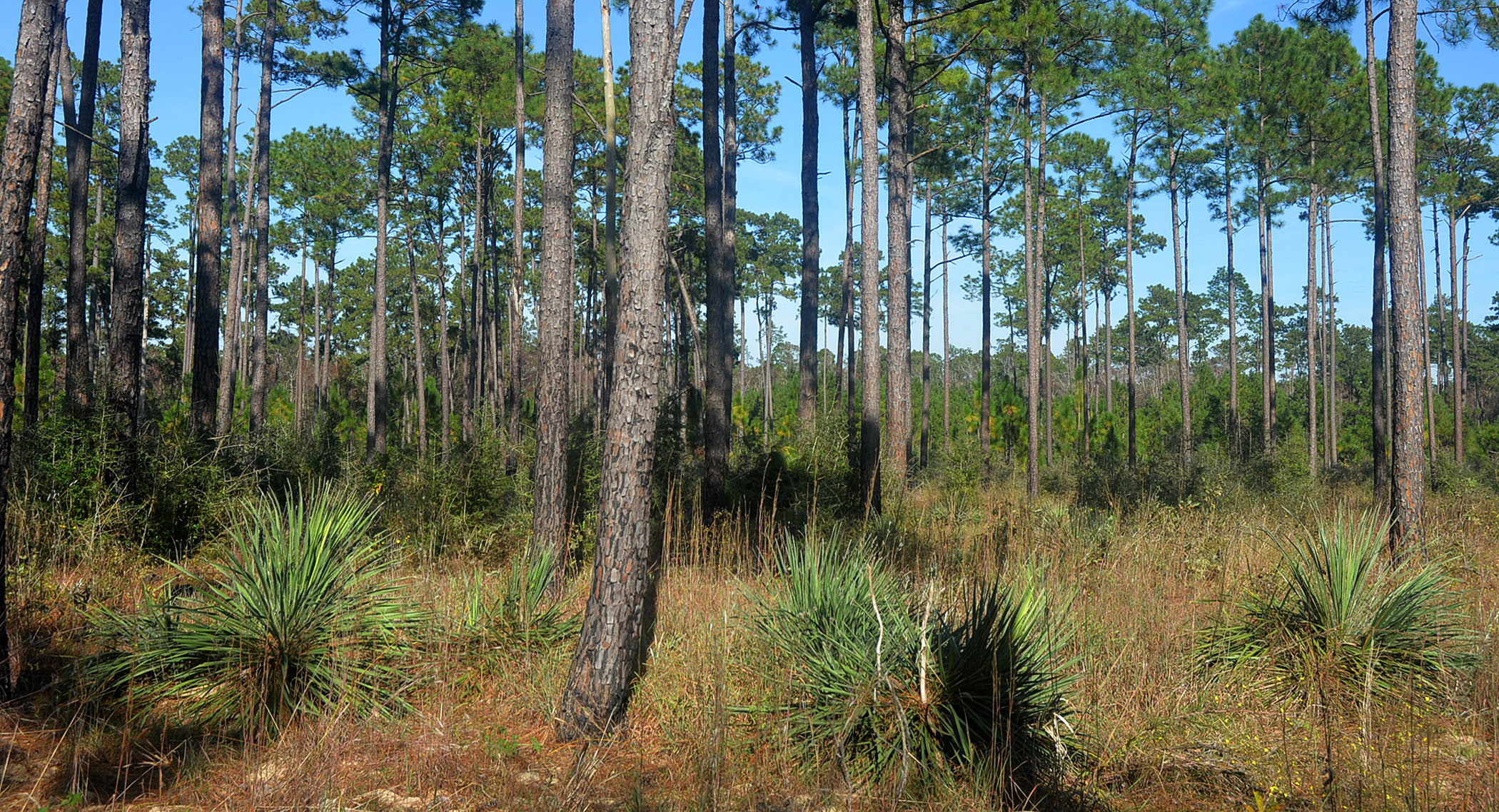
Louisiana yucca (Yucca louisianensis), Roy E. Larsen Sandyland Sanctuary, Hardin County, Texas (November 2019)

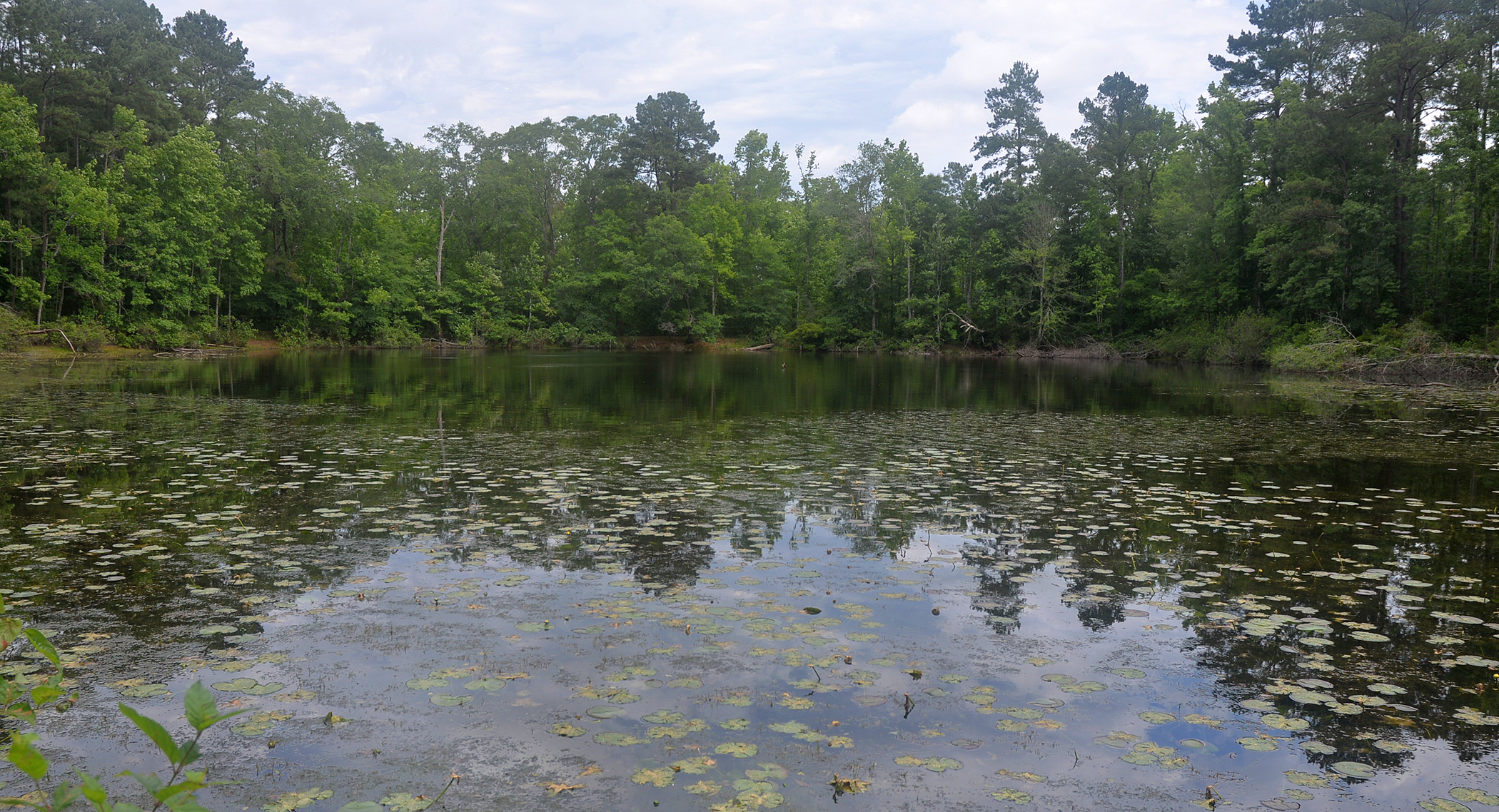
Woodland pond, Big Thicket National Preserve, Polk County, Texas, (May 2020)

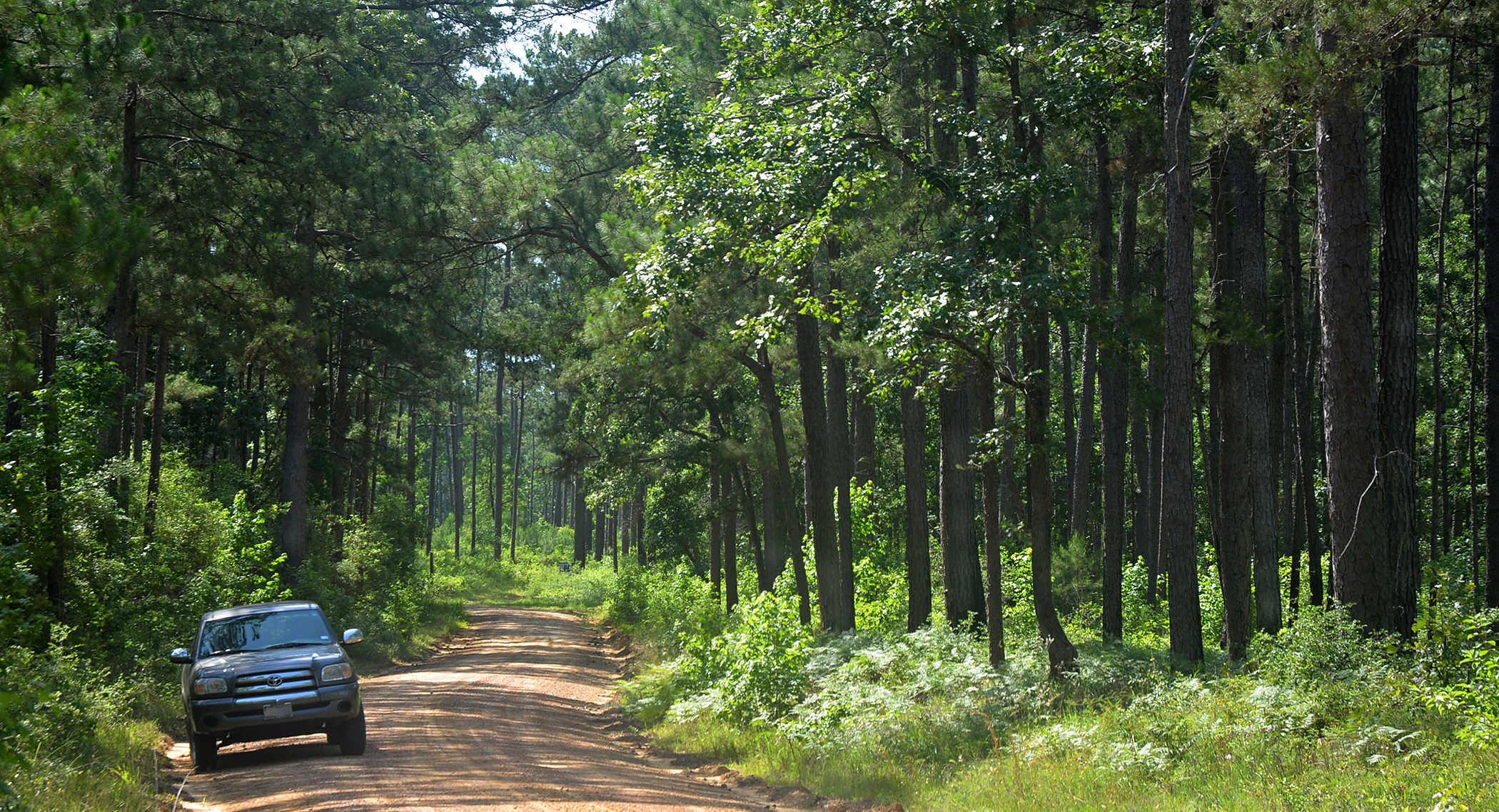
Long-leaf pine uplands, Big Thicket National Preserve, Polk County, Texas (May 2020)

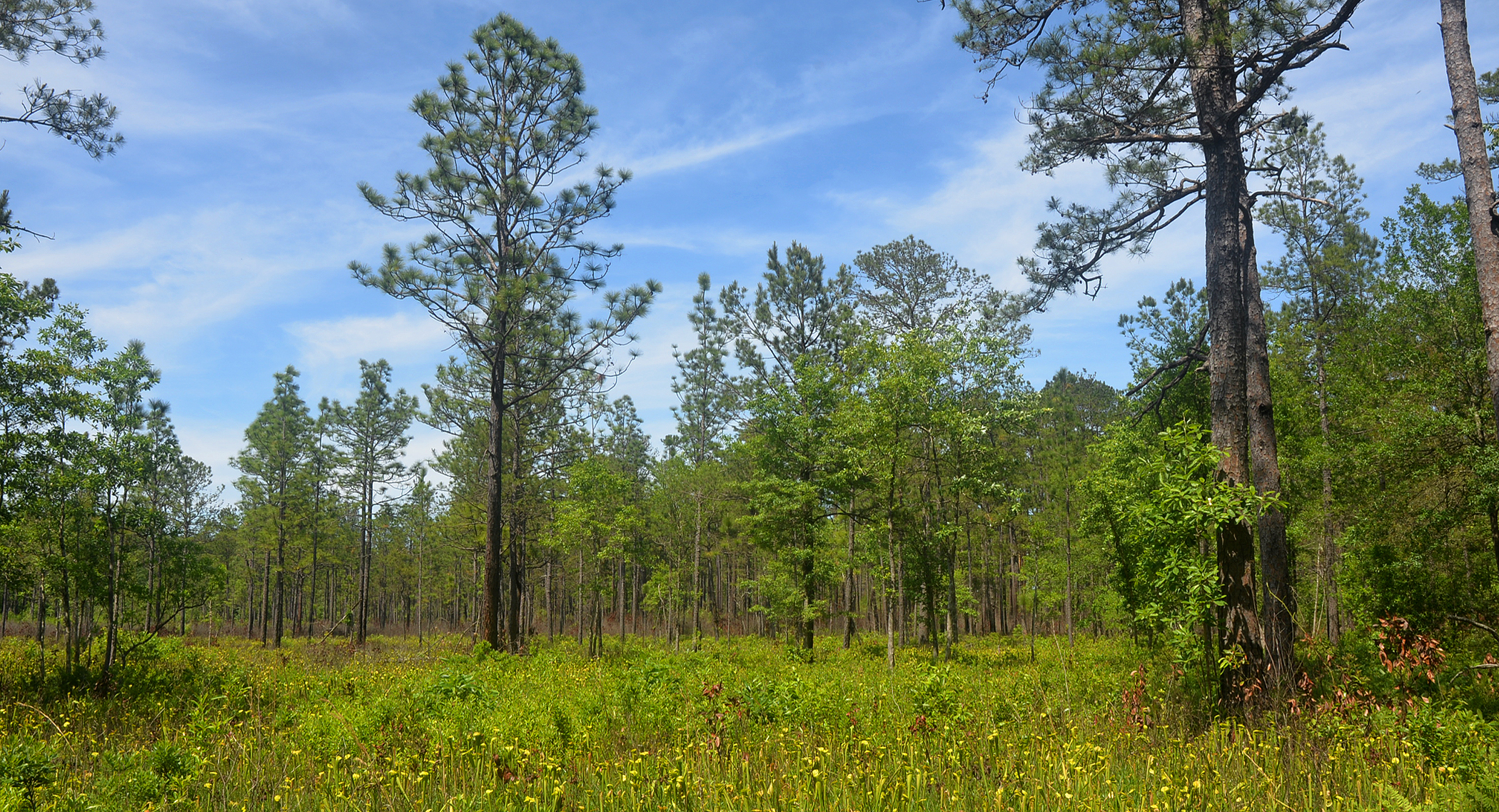
Long-leaf pine savannah wet-lands with pitcher plants (Sarracenia alata) in foreground, Tyler County, Texas (May 2020)

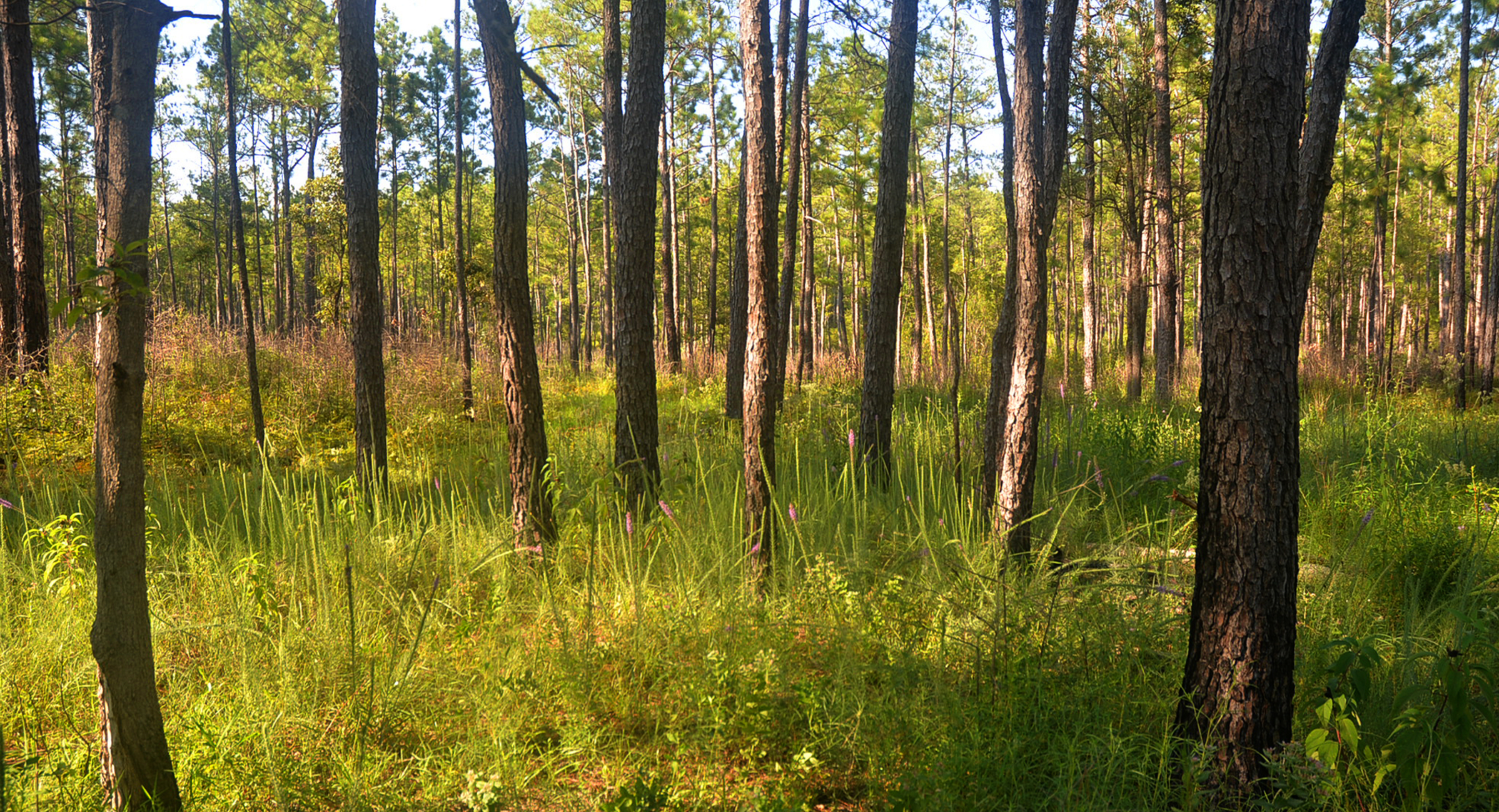
Long-leaf pine uplands, Big Thicket National Preserve, Tyler County, Texas, (August 2020)

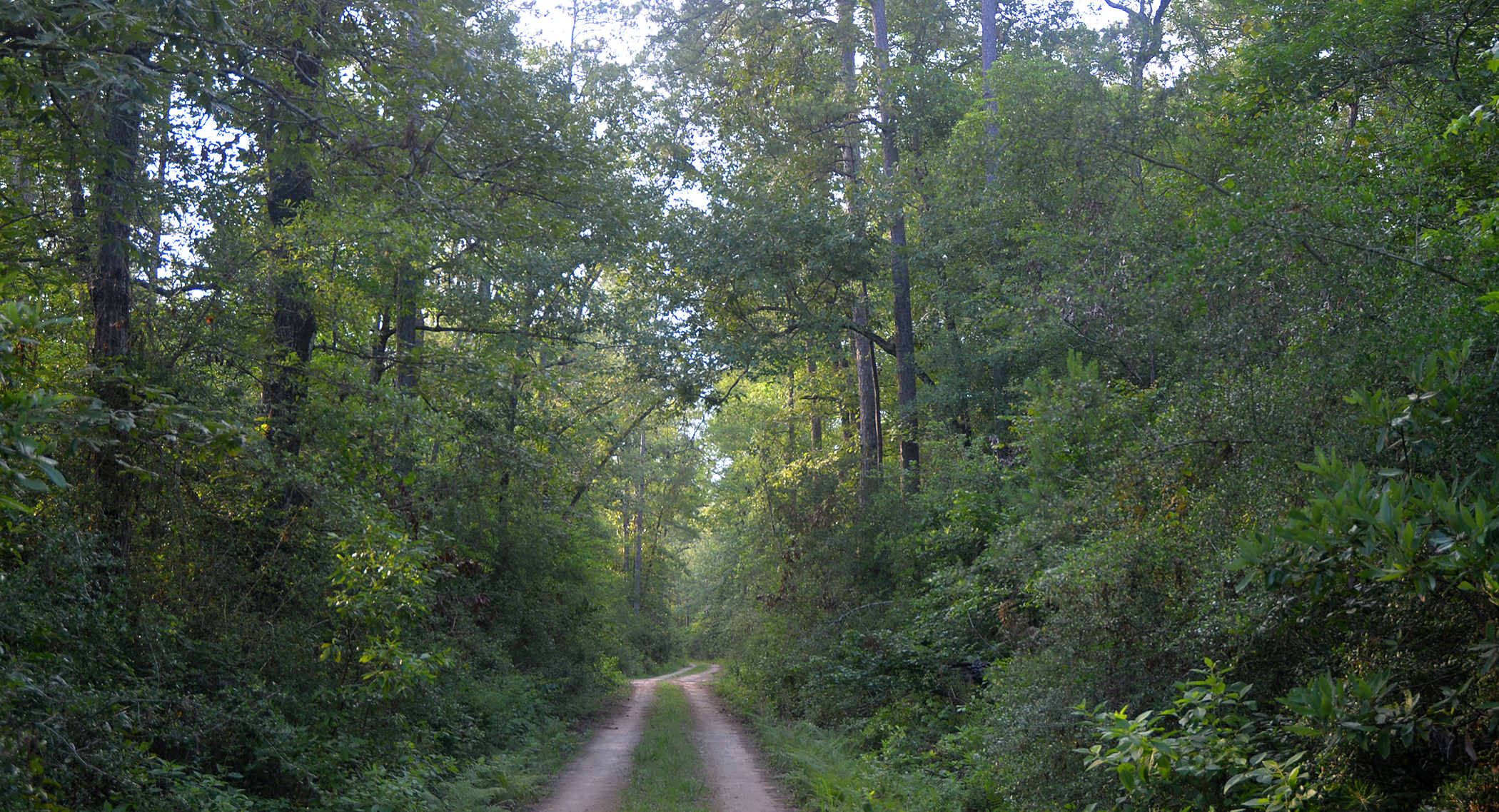
Big Thicket National Preserve, Hardin County, Texas (May 2020).

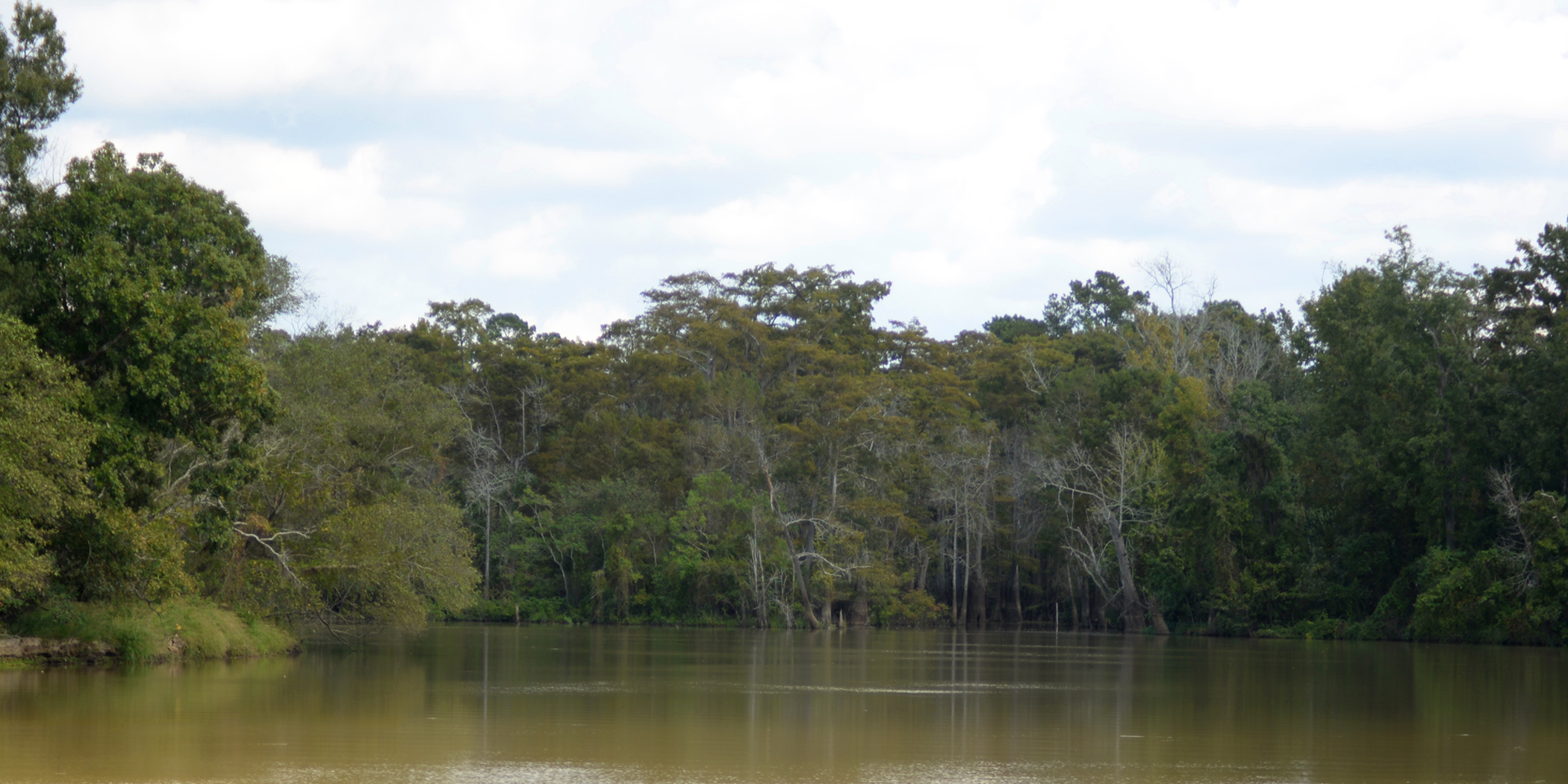
Neches River, Orange County, Texas (October 2016)

== See also ==
- Big Thicket
- History of Texas forests
- List of ecoregions in the United States (WWF)
- Lost Pines Forest, a disjunct forest genetically related to the Piney Woods, over 100 miles to the west in central Texas
- University of Arkansas at Monticello College of Forestry and Natural Resources, forestry program at University of Arkansas at Monticello campus in Monticello, Arkansas
