= Lumberton =

Lumberton is the name of several places:

== Canada ==
- Lumberton, British Columbia, a ghost town

== United States ==
- Lumberton, Florida, an unincorporated community in Pasco County, Florida
- Lumberton, Mississippi
- Lumberton, New Jersey
- Lumberton, New Mexico
- Lumberton, North Carolina
  - Lumberton Commercial Historic District
  - Lumberton Municipal Airport
- Lumberton, Ohio
- Lumberton, Texas

== See also ==
- Lumberton High School (disambiguation)
- Lumberton Independent School District, Texas
- Lumberton Public School District, Mississippi
- Lumberton Township School District, New Jersey
