= Turkey Creek (Village Creek Tributary) =

Stream in southeastern Texas, United States

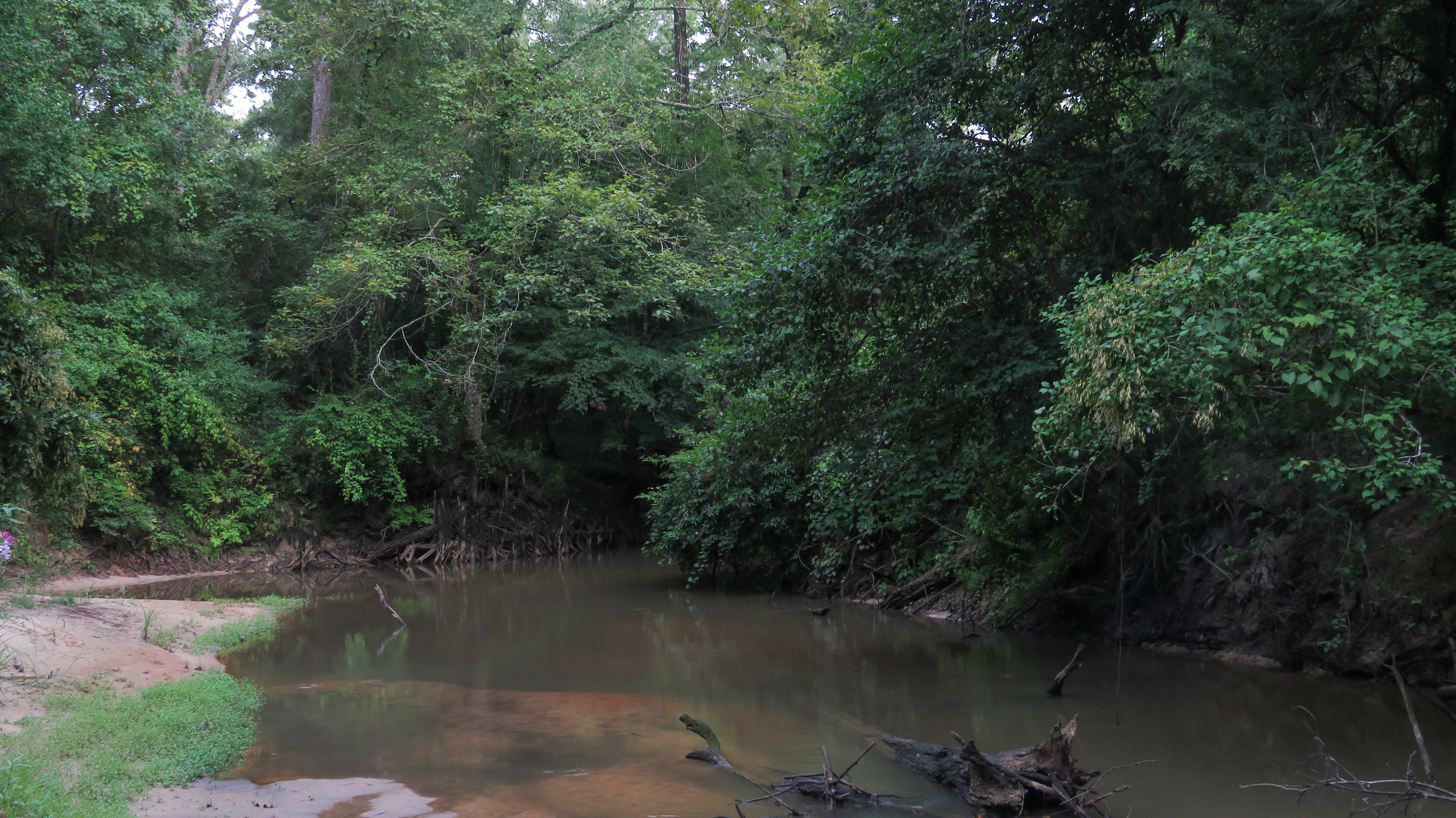
- View of the Creek in the Big Thicket National Preserve, Tyler County TX

- Location of the creek's mouth

Location
- Country: United States
- State: Texas

Physical characteristics
- Source
  - location: Central Tyler County, Texas, northwest of Woodville
  - coordinates: 30°50′49″N 94°28′15″W
- Mouth
  - location: Village Creek, Hardin County, Texas
  - coordinates: 30°28′16″N 94°20′32″W

Turkey Creek is a stream in Texas, United States. It rises in Central Tyler county and flows 30 miles (48 km) before converging with Village Creek, east of Kountze, Hardin County. It passes through the 8,032-acre (3,250 ha) Turkey Creek Unit of the Big Thicket National Preserve on its way south.

== Ecology ==
The floodplains surrounding Turkey Creek host cypress sloughs, baygalls, swamps and beaver ponds. Tree species found in the associated plant communities include Bald cypress (Taxodium distichum), Tupelos (Nyssa sp.), Sweetbay Magnolia (Magnolia virginiana), water oak (Quercus nigra) and laurel oak (Quercus laurifolia). Arid sandylands and pine savanna wetlands are found in the adjacent upland. Associated tree species found in the drier sandylands include sand post oak (Quercus margarettae) and Bluejack Oak (Quercus incana), while Swamp tupelo (Nyssa biflora) and Swamp Titi (Cyrilla racemiflora) are found in the moist savannas. Longleaf pine (Pinus paluistris) is found in both of these habitats. The creek's drainage is considered one of the most biologically diverse areas in the region. At least 70 species of tree, 50 shrubs, 40 vines, and 468 herbaceous plants are found in the section of the National Preserve it passes through.

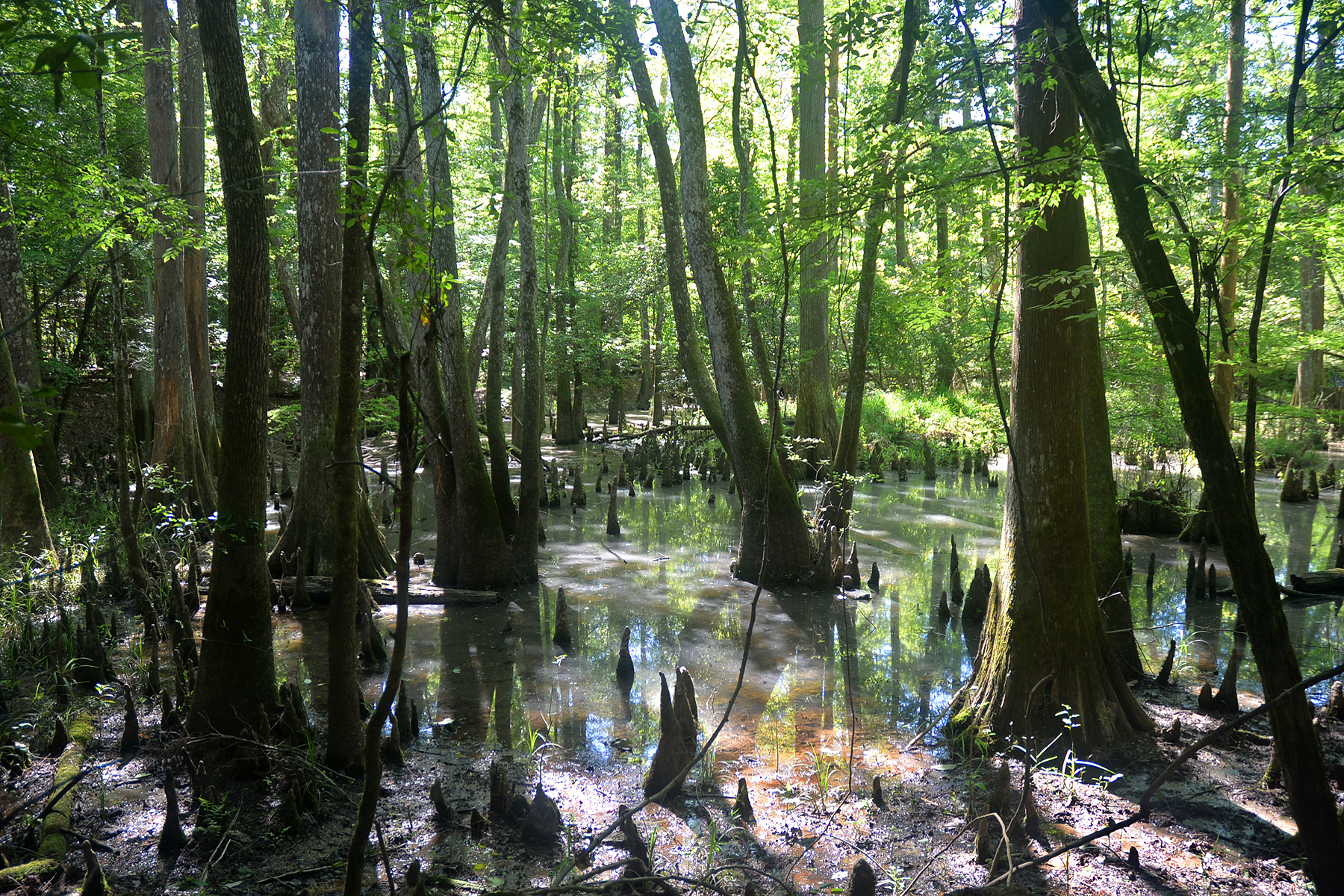
A cypress slough located adjacent to the creek

== See also ==
- Big Thicket
- Village Creek
