= Chionodes adamas =

Scientific classification
- Kingdom: Animalia
- Phylum: Arthropoda
- Clade: Pancrustacea
- Class: Insecta
- Order: Lepidoptera
- Family: Gelechiidae
- Genus: Chionodes
- Species: C. adamas

Binomial name
- Chionodes adamas Hodges, 1999

Species of moth

Chionodes adamas is a moth in the family Gelechiidae. It is found in North America, where it has been recorded from southern Quebec and Manitoba to Mississippi and Texas.

The larvae are leaf folders and tiers on Quercus alba, Quercus ilicifolia, Quercus laurifolia, Quercus prinus and Quercus rubra.
