= Village Creek State Park =

Village Creek State Park can refer to either of two state parks in the United States:

- Village Creek State Park (Arkansas)
- Village Creek State Park (Texas)
