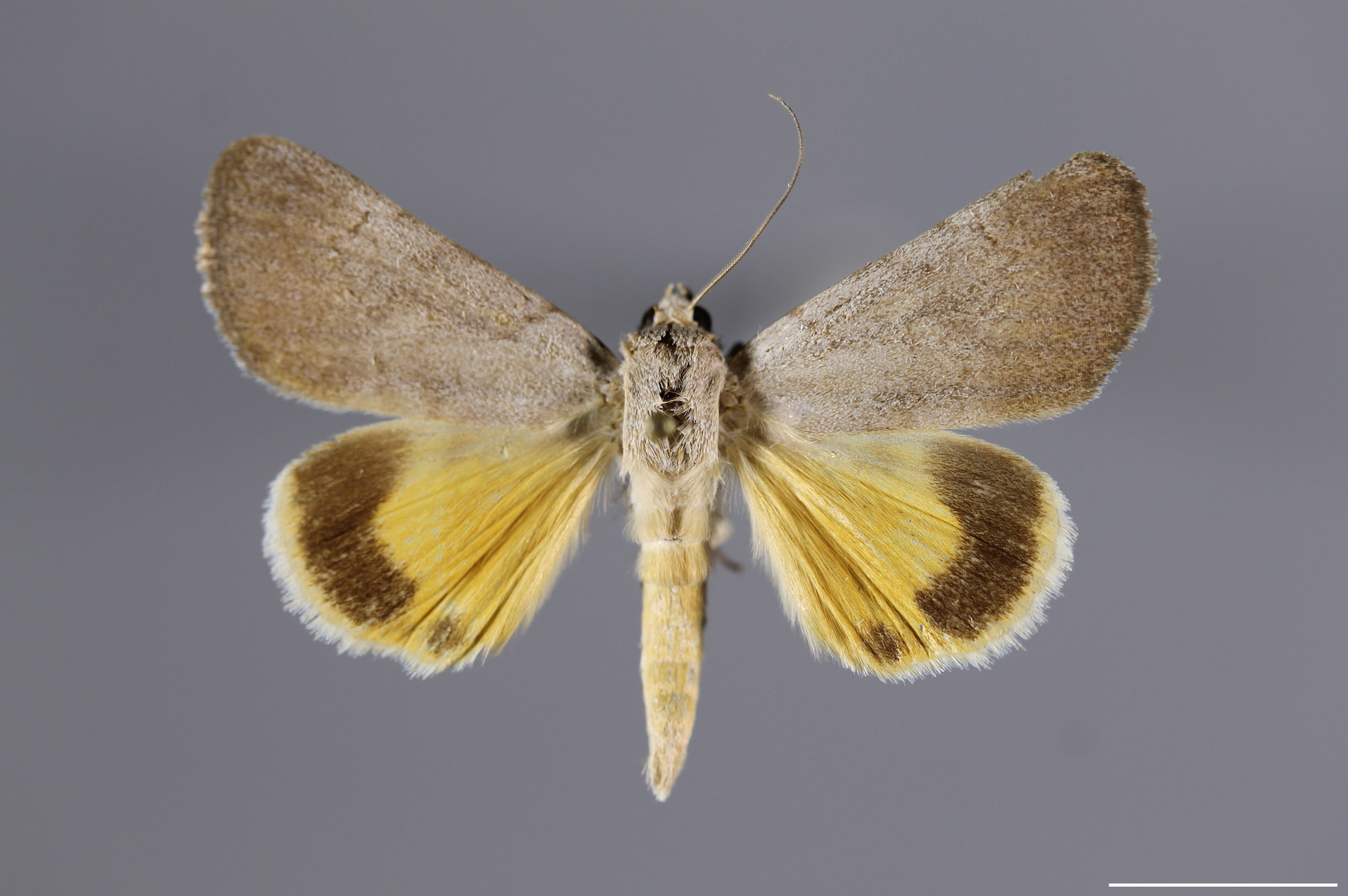

Scientific classification
- Kingdom: Animalia
- Phylum: Arthropoda
- Class: Insecta
- Order: Lepidoptera
- Superfamily: Noctuoidea
- Family: Erebidae
- Genus: Catocala
- Species: C. messalina

Binomial name
- Catocala messalina Guenée, 1852

Synonyms
- Catocala belfragiana Harvey, 1875; Catocala jocasta Strecker, 1875

= Catocala messalina =

Species of moth

Catocala messalina, the Messalina underwing, is a moth of the family Erebidae. The species was first described by Achille Guenée in 1852. It is found in the United States from Virginia south to Florida and west to Texas and north to Kansas.

The wingspan is 40–45 mm. Adults are on wing from May to August. There is probably one generation per year.

The larvae feed on the oak species Quercus geminata, Quercus hemisphaerica and Quercus virginiana.
