= Village Creek (Texas) =

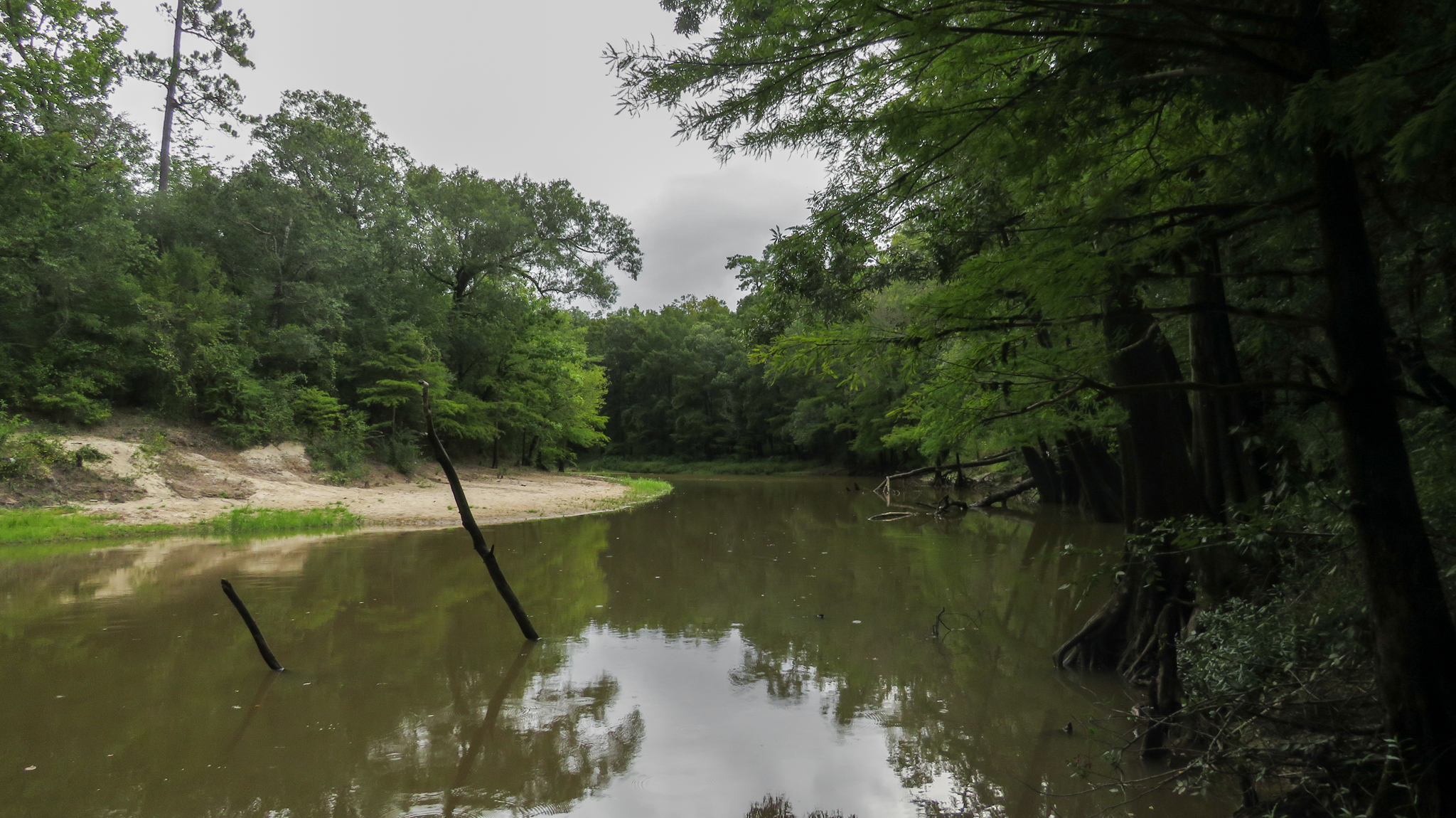

Location
- Country: United States
- State: Texas

Physical characteristics
- Source
  - location: The confluence of Big Sandy Creek and Kimball creek, Hardin County, Texas
  - coordinates: 30°30′08″N 94°26′03″W
  - elevation: 131 ft (40 m)
- Mouth: The Neches River southeast of Lumberton, Texas
  - location: 30°14′30″N 94°07′10″W
  - elevation: 29 ft (9 m)

Basin features
- Tributaries
  - right: Turkey Creek

Village Creek is a blackwater tributary of the Neches River in Texas, United States. It arises in northwestern Hardin County outside the community of Village Mills. Due to the waterway's isolation and absence of impoundments, it is known to be pristine supporting cypress swamps and hardwood forests, as well as many rare and endangered species. It is 63 miles (101 km) long and average streamflow at the mouth is approximately 1,000 cubic feet per second (28 m^{3}/s). It passes through three conservation areas on the way south, being: the Big Thicket National Preserve - Village Creek Corridor Unit, Roy E. Larsen Sandyland Sanctuary, and Village Creek State Park.

== Ecology and Wildlife ==
Several areas in the creek's drainage are home to arid sandyland habitat dominated by Longleaf Pine (Pinus palustris), Blue Jack Oak (Quercus incana) and farkleberry (Vaccinium arboreum). Large deposits of well draining sand left behind by receding seas contribute to the area's xeric nature. Additionally, lack of nutrients in the substrate causes sparse overstory, leading to higher average temperatures and more dryness. Some common understory plants include the prairie prickly pear cactus (Opuntia macrorhiza), Gulf Coast Yucca (Yucca louisianensis), Sandhill sunflower (helianthus debilis subsp. silvestris), as well as rare plants such as Oklahoma Prairie Clover (Dalea villosa subsp. grisea), and the endemic Texas trailing phlox (Phlox nivalis subsp. texensis).

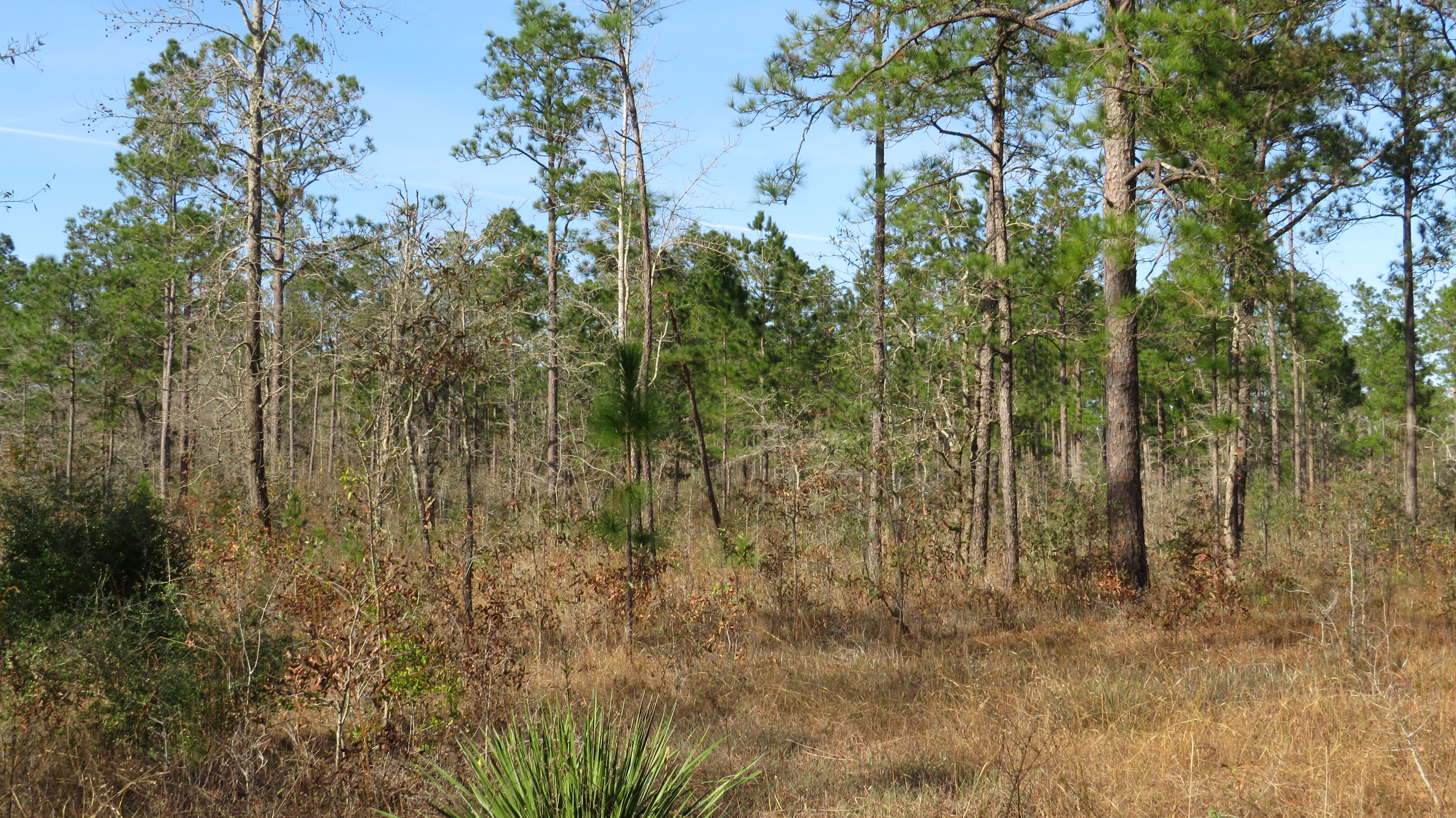
An oak-farkleberry-longleaf sandyland adjacent to the creek

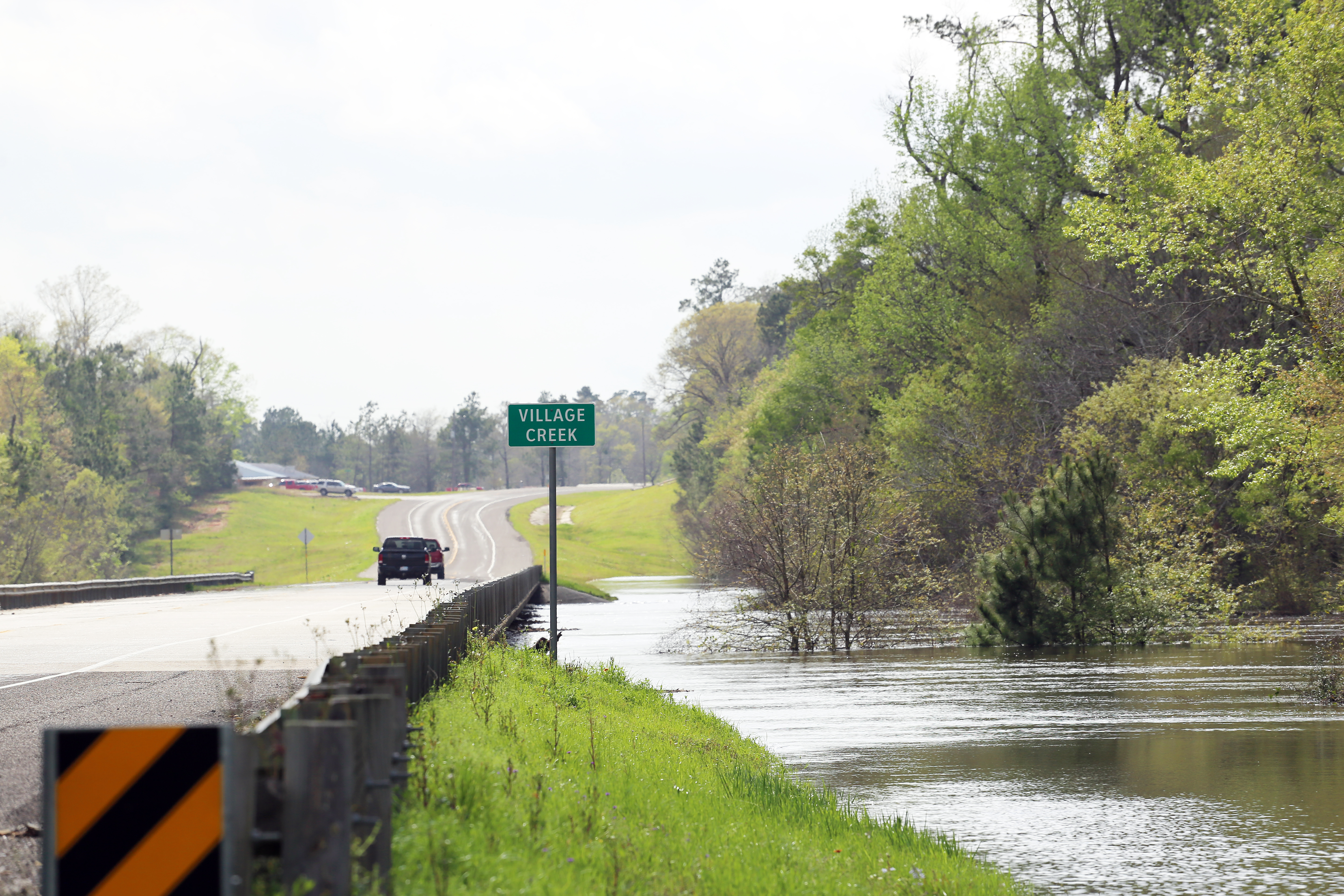
Village Creek near Silsbee

== See also ==
- List of rivers of Texas
- Neches River
- Big Sandy Creek
- Big Thicket
