= Clay Buchholz =

American baseball pitcher (born 1984)

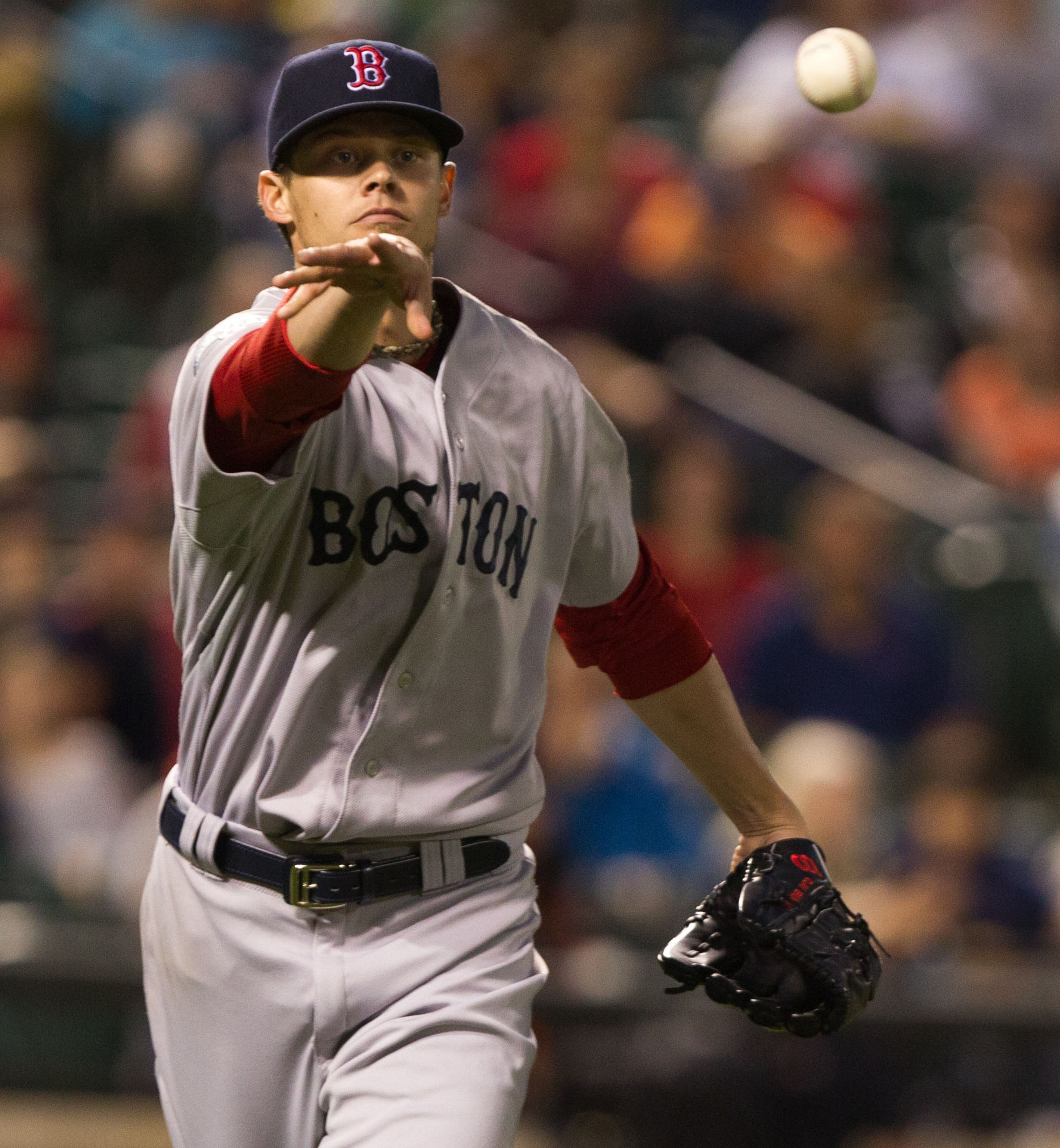
- Buchholz with the Red Sox in 2012
- Pitcher
- Born: August 14, 1984 (age 42); Nederland, Texas, U.S.
- Batted: Left Threw: Right

MLB debut
- August 17, 2007, for the Boston Red Sox

Last MLB appearance
- September 29, 2019, for the Toronto Blue Jays

MLB statistics
- Win–loss record: 90–69
- Earned run average: 3.98
- Strikeouts: 1,024
- Stats at Baseball Reference

Teams
- Boston Red Sox (2007–2016); Philadelphia Phillies (2017); Arizona Diamondbacks (2018); Toronto Blue Jays (2019)

Career highlights and awards
- 2× All-Star (2010, 2013); World Series champion (2013); Pitched a no-hitter on September 1, 2007

Clay Daniel Buchholz (born August 14, 1984) is an American former professional baseball pitcher. He played in Major League Baseball (MLB) for the Boston Red Sox, Philadelphia Phillies, Arizona Diamondbacks, and Toronto Blue Jays. Buchholz made his MLB debut with the Red Sox in 2007. In his second major league start, he pitched a no-hitter, becoming the third MLB pitcher since 1900 to throw a no-hitter in his first or second start and the first Red Sox rookie to throw one. He was a two-time MLB All-Star.

== High school ==
Raised in Lumberton, Texas, Buchholz played baseball for the local youth baseball leagues, and then for the Lumberton High School Raiders.

== College career ==
Buchholz began his college career in 2004 at McNeese State University. He was subsequently dismissed from the McNeese baseball team after stealing 29 laptop computers from a middle school and selling them on the McNeese State University campus.

Buchholz then transferred to Angelina College. In 2005, while competing for the Roadrunners, Buchholz appeared in 15 games, winning 12 and losing 1. His 1.05 ERA, seven complete games, and 129 strikeouts all stand as team records (through the 2010 season). He was also named an All-American in 2005.

Winning %	CG	ERA	Innings Pitched	Hits	Runs	Earned Runs	BB	Strikeouts
92.3%	7	1.05	85.2	44	19	10	29	129

== Professional career ==
=== Minor leagues ===
Buchholz was drafted by the Red Sox in the supplemental first round of the 2005 draft. The Red Sox obtained their supplemental pick, the 42nd overall, as compensation for losing free agent Pedro Martínez to the New York Mets.

Buchholz pitched 41 1/3 innings for the Lowell Spinners of the New York–Penn League, compiling a record of 0–1 with 45 strikeouts in 15 starts. He then pitched for the Wilmington Blue Rocks (Class-A Advanced) and the Greenville Drive (Class-A). Between the two teams, Buchholz struck out 140 and walked 33 in 119 innings while going 11–4.

Buchholz started his first spring training game in 2007 against the Tampa Bay Rays. He pitched 4 2/3 innings, gave up seven hits and three runs, and recorded three strikeouts. While competing for the Portland Sea Dogs in 2007, Buchholz played in fifteen games, winning seven and losing two. His success led to his selection for the All-Star Futures Game at AT&T Park.

Buchholz was promoted to the Pawtucket Red Sox, the Triple-A affiliate of the Red Sox, on July 8, 2007. He finished the Triple-A season with a 1–3 record while recording 55 strikeouts, 13 walks, and a 3.96 era over eight starts in 38 2/3 Triple-A innings.

=== Boston Red Sox (2007–16) ===
==== 2007 season ====
Buchholz made his major league debut with the Boston Red Sox against the Los Angeles Angels of Anaheim on August 17, 2007, at Fenway Park. The Sox won the game 8–4 and he picked up the win, going six innings and giving up four runs (three earned). After the game, however, Buchholz was optioned to the Sox' Triple-A team in Pawtucket. "I got my feet wet", he said to a reporter. "I hope I can come back in September and help out." Before Buchholz' first major league start, Red Sox manager Terry Francona said: "This kid can come up and pitch a no-hitter, and he's going to go back down... If he throws a no-hitter I may send him back with a present. But he's going back."

===== No-hitter =====
In only his second career major league start on September 1, 2007, he became the first Boston Red Sox rookie to throw a no-hitter when he blanked the Baltimore Orioles 10–0. He threw 115 pitches, struck out nine, walked three, and hit Nick Markakis. After the game, Buchholz told the media, "It's amazing. That's all I can say… I'm in a blur right now." According to the Elias Sports Bureau, Buchholz became the third pitcher since 1900 to pitch a no-hitter in his first or second major league start. Bobo Holloman did it in his first start on May 6, 1953, for the St. Louis Browns at home against the Philadelphia Athletics, and Wilson Álvarez did it in his second start on August 11, 1991, for the Chicago White Sox at Baltimore.

Buchholz became the 11th Red Sox pitcher to throw a no-hitter in Fenway Park history, and the 17th in Red Sox history.

Following the game, general manager Theo Epstein and manager Terry Francona each independently confirmed that they had spoken by phone to each other in the seventh and eighth innings concerning Buchholz' pitch count. He had not thrown more than 98 pitches in a game all year, and was threatening to significantly exceed that total if he finished the game. Epstein reported that in no way would Buchholz have been allowed to face a batter after reaching 120 pitches, expressing concern about excessive pitches potentially damaging such a young and inexperienced arm. Buchholz finished the game with 115 pitches, allowing Francona to escape what would have been an unpleasant decision to remove a pitcher from the game in which he was throwing a no-hitter.

Buchholz' no-hitter was the third of a record-setting four caught by Jason Varitek. The first two were for Hideo Nomo and Derek Lowe (in which the final score was also 10–0); the fourth was Jon Lester's on May 19, 2008, against the Kansas City Royals, which was also the first no-hitter in major league play after Buchholz's.

===== Shut down =====
Buchholz pitched in two more games after the no-hitter, earning a win while pitching three innings of relief at Baltimore on September 6, and taking a loss after a start of 4 2/3 innings at Toronto on September 19.

When Buchholz experienced shoulder fatigue, Red Sox management made a decision to shut him down for 2007. Buchholz was left off the postseason roster as the Red Sox eventually won the 2007 World Series in a four-game sweep over the Colorado Rockies. In spite of this, he was awarded a World Series ring by the Red Sox.

==== 2008 season ====
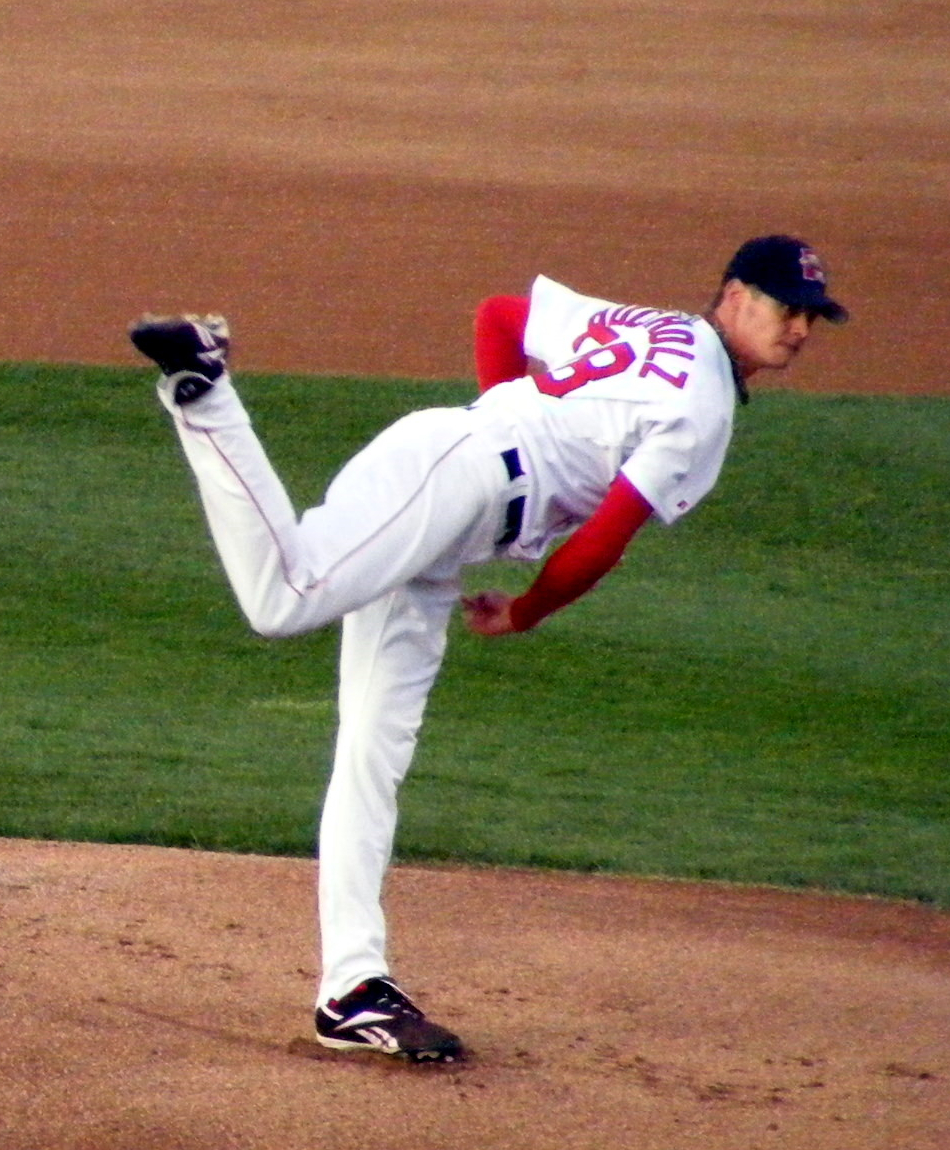
Buchholz pitching for the Portland Sea Dogs on August 25, 2008

Red Sox pitching coach John Farrell stated that Buchholz would most likely be in line for 180–190 innings in the 2008 season. On May 15, Buchholz was placed on the 15-day disabled list as the result of a torn fingernail. He was optioned to Triple-A Pawtucket following the injury, and remained there for several weeks to work on his fastball. On July 11, he was recalled to Boston and was part of their regular pitching rotation, though he did not record a single win after his return. On August 20, as the Red Sox were trying to sweep the Orioles, the team that Buchholz had no-hit the preceding year, he gave up a 4–0 lead by allowing three runs in the second inning and two more in the third. He was removed after only pitching 2 1/3 innings. In his previous start, he had only lasted three innings. In 2008, the Red Sox were 3–12 in Buchholz' fifteen starts. After the game, Buchholz was demoted to Double-A Portland. Buchholz stated "I've never had a streak like this", and "I've never been one to say the pressure was too much for me, but I've felt like I've had a lot of weight on my shoulders just trying to be perfect and trying to do everything as well as I could to help this team win". Following the 2008 season, Buchholz pitched in the Arizona Fall League.

==== 2009 season ====
Following spring training, Buchholz was optioned to Triple-A Pawtucket.

In his eighth start at Pawtucket in 2009, Buchholz took a perfect game into the ninth inning against the Louisville Bats, but it was denied after a leadoff single; ultimately, he pitched a one-hit shutout.

After a July 12 win before the All-Star break, Red Sox manager Terry Francona announced that Buchholz would be activated to pitch against the Toronto Blue Jays on July 17, in order to give more time off to the starters who were in the All-Star game. Buchholz went on to win the game, pitching 5 2/3 innings, allowing four hits with one run, while walking three and striking out three. It was his first major league win since May 2, 2008.

The Red Sox pitching staff floundered in the second half of the year. Tim Wakefield, Josh Beckett and Lester were the only dependable starters in the first half (John Smoltz, Daisuke Matsuzaka and Brad Penny all had losing records). While Lester remained effective in the second half, Beckett began to struggle, and when All-Star Tim Wakefield was placed on the disabled list, Buchholz replaced him in the rotation. Buchholz' pitching down the stretch played a large role in helping the Red Sox make it into the playoffs (along with a strong return from Matsuzaka). He finished the season 7–4 with a 4.21 ERA and 68 strikeouts in 16 starts.

==== 2010 season ====
Buchholz delivered a strong first half of the 2010 season. On the strength of his 10–4 record, and a 2.45 ERA, he was selected to the American League All-Star Team. In the month of June, Buchholz went 3–1 with a 1.84 ERA, including a five-hit shutout at Baltimore on June 4 — his first shutout since his 2007 no-hitter, which, coincidentally, was also against Baltimore. On the road in the season's first half, he went 5–1 with a 1.70 ERA. Though earning a spot on the roster, Buchholz was not called upon to pitch in the All-Star Game; he pulled a hamstring June 26 during an interleague game against the San Francisco Giants and was placed on the disabled list.

He made his first start after his stint on the DL on July 21 against Gio González of the Oakland Athletics, pitching four innings, giving up five earned runs, with two strikeouts and three walks in a 6–4 loss. Buchholz returned to his pre-injury form after the start in Oakland by going 4–0 in August with a 1.03 ERA and winning the AL pitcher of the month award. Buchholz finished the season with a 17–7 record and 2.33 ERA, thereby finishing second in ERA to Félix Hernández. Buchholz finished sixth in the voting for the American League Cy Young Award, also won by Hernandez.

==== 2011 season ====
Buchholz began the season as the number three starter in the Red Sox rotation. On April 10, Buchholz signed a four-year contract extension, worth nearly $30 million. On June 16, he went on the disabled list unexpectedly and in August it was reported that he had a stress fracture in his back. He then missed the rest of the season. In 2011, Buchholz made 14 starts going 6–3 with a 3.48 ERA.

==== 2012 season ====
Buchholz started the 2012 season 8–2, winning four consecutive decisions. However, he was placed on the 15-day disabled list after he was hospitalized with a "gastrointestinal situation", stated then-manager Bobby Valentine. On August 16, Buchholz pitched an immaculate inning against the Baltimore Orioles in the sixth inning. He went on to win the game 6–3 in eight innings of work. On June 26, he was diagnosed with esophagitis, an inflammation that damages tissues of the esophagus. For the 2012 year, Buchholz made 29 starts with an 11–8 record and a 4.56 ERA.

==== 2013 season ====
On April 14, Buchholz took a no-hitter into the top of the eighth inning against the Tampa Bay Rays before allowing a hit. Buchholz went on to finish the month of April with a 5–0 record, followed by picking up his sixth win in his first start of May. This made his ERA in those six starts 1.01, to go with a win in every appearance. In April, Buchholz was named Pitcher of the Month, along with Matt Harvey. Buchholz had a 9–0 record until being placed on the disabled list on June 18 due to a neck strain that had been bothering him since June 9, causing him to be out until September 10. Buchholz won three of his four starts after returning from injury, finishing the regular season with a record of 12–1. In the postseason, Buchholz made four starts despite re-aggravating his shoulder injury and won the World Series for the first time in his career when the Red Sox defeated the St. Louis Cardinals in six games.

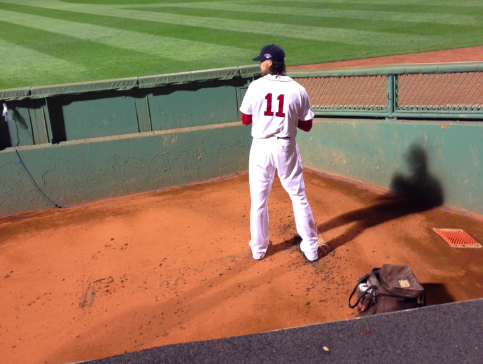
Clay Buchholz warming up before Game 2 of the 2013 ALCS.

==== 2014 season ====
Buchholz struggled to start the 2014 season, posting a 7.02 ERA through two months. He finished the year with an 8–11 record and a league-worst 5.34 ERA. He was the only pitcher on the Red Sox Opening Day rotation not to be traded.

==== 2015 season ====
Buchholz made his first Opening Day start for the Red Sox on April 6 against the Philadelphia Phillies. He ended the season with a 7–7 record in 18 starts, compiling an ERA of 3.26 and a WHIP of 1.21 with 107 strikeouts. Once again, his season was cut short by injury.

==== 2016 season ====
Buchholz made his first start on April 6 against the Cleveland Indians, receiving a no decision after giving up five runs in four innings. After a loss on May 26 against the Colorado Rockies, with a record of 2–5 and an ERA of 6.35, the Red Sox announced that he would be moved to the bullpen. After three scoreless relief appearances, he was moved back into the rotation. On July 2, Buchholz allowed six runs (three of them earned) in 4 1/3 innings against the Los Angeles Angels of Anaheim, a game the Red Sox would go on to lose 21–2. With that loss, his record was 3–9 for the season, and two days later the Red Sox announced that he would again be moved to the bullpen. Buchholz next pitched on July 21, and made a total of eight relief appearances before returning to the rotation for three starts in August. He then returned to the bullpen for three more relief appearances, then returned to the rotation in September for five starts. In his final eight starts of the year, he had a record of 4–0 plus four no decisions. For the season, Buchholz made a total of 37 appearances, including 21 starts, with an ERA of 4.78 in 139 1/3 innings pitched, and a win–loss record of 8–10. He tied for the major league lead in grand slams allowed, with three.

=== Philadelphia Phillies ===
On December 20, 2016, Buchholz was traded to the Philadelphia Phillies for minor league second baseman Josh Tobias.

==== 2017 season ====
Buchholz made his debut with the Phillies on April 6, giving up four runs in five innings and getting a no decision against the Cincinnati Reds, followed by 2 1/3 innings against the New York Mets on April 11, when he gave up six runs and took the loss. On April 12, it was announced that Buchholz had a partial tear in the flexor-pronator mass of his right arm. On April 18, Buchholz underwent surgery on his right forearm to repair the flexor tendon, a procedure expected to require four to six months for recovery. He became a free agent following the season.

=== Kansas City Royals ===
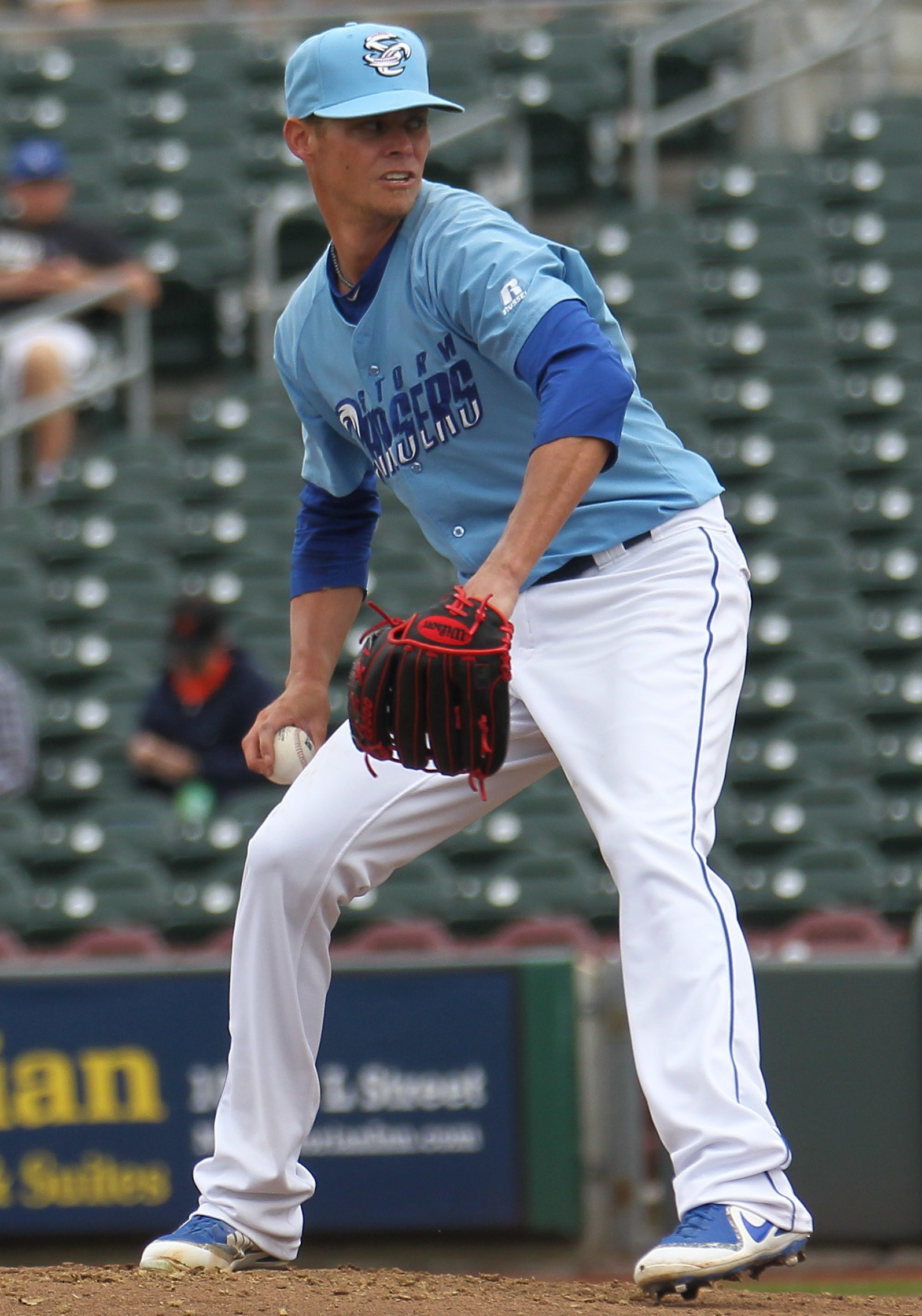
Buchholz with the Storm Chasers in April 2018

On March 19, 2018, Buchholz signed a minor league deal with the Kansas City Royals. He recorded a 1–0 mark, with nine strikeouts, in three appearances for the Double-A Northwest Arkansas Naturals and the Triple-A Omaha Storm Chasers. The Royals released Buchholz on May 1.

=== Arizona Diamondbacks ===
On May 5, 2018, after opting-out of his minor league deal with the Royals, Buchholz signed a minor league contract with the Arizona Diamondbacks. He was assigned to the Triple-A Reno Aces upon signing.

==== 2018 season ====
Two weeks after signing with the Diamondbacks, manager Torey Lovullo announced that Buchholz would start on May 20, against the New York Mets. Buchholz went on to pitch well against the Mets in his first start since April 2017, pitching five innings of one run ball, striking out two and walking one, while ultimately receiving a no decision. On August 16, he pitched a complete-game against the San Diego Padres, yielding only a solo home run to Hunter Renfroe. Buchholz finished the season 7–2 in 16 starts. He posted an ERA of 2.01 in 98 1/3 innings. He became a free agent following the season.

=== Toronto Blue Jays ===
On March 5, 2019, Buchholz signed a one-year, $3 million contract with the Toronto Blue Jays. Buchholz recorded a 2–5 record and 6.56 ERA in 12 appearances with Toronto and became a free agent after the year.

== Scouting report ==
Buchholz throws a four-seam fastball (90–94 mph) topping out at 96 and has reached 99 in the past, a two-seam fastball (89–93), a cutter (87–91), a curveball (75–79), and a straight changeup (78–81). Since 2010, he has not thrown a slider (78–81). In 2012, he threw a handful of splitters to left-handed hitters, but the pitch was thrown just 2% of the time the whole season. His most commonly thrown pitch when ahead in the count is his 11–5 curveball. His repertoire does not vary greatly between left-handers and right-handers. Buchholz has never compiled large strikeout totals, but his changeup does have a high whiff rate of 45%.

== Awards and honors ==
- Carolina League Pitcher of the Week (August 21–27, 2006)
- Red Sox Minor League Pitcher of the Month (August 2006)
- 2006 Red Sox Minor League Pitcher of the Year
- Red Sox Minor League Pitcher of the Month (May 2007)
- 2007 Futures Game All-Star
- 2007 Eastern League All-Star
- Eastern League Pitcher of the Week (June 25 – July 1, 2007)
- Pitched a no-hitter (September 1, 2007)
- 2007 American League Player of the Week
- MLB.com TYIB Single Game Performance of the Year (December 13, 2007)
- 2× MLB All-Star (2010, 2013)
- American League Pitcher of the Month (August 2010)
- 2013 World Series champion

== Charity work ==
Buchholz regularly supported the Jimmy Fund charity while a Red Sox. In November 2006, when he was Red Sox minor-league pitcher of the year, Buchholz was announced as a member of the New Stars for Young Stars team. In 2010, he was named Jimmy Fund Co-Captain with Tim Wakefield. He signed on for the same role in 2011. He and Wakefield were the 2011 Spokesplayers for the Rally Against Cancer.

In March 2011, Buchholz partnered with Charity Wines to release his own wine label under the Longball Cellars brand. Proceeds from sales of his ChardonClay Chardonnay support the Jimmy Fund and Dana-Farber. He partnered with former teammate Jon Lester, who also released a Charity Wine, called CabernAce, to raise money for the Fred Hutchinson Cancer Research Center.

== Personal life ==
On November 14, 2009, Buchholz married Lindsay Clubine, a model on the TV show Deal or No Deal who was featured in People magazine's "100 Most Beautiful People." They have three children together: two daughters and a son. In 2020, Buchholz and his wife filed a lawsuit against Crestbrook Insurance Company after their Austin, Texas, home was demolished due to the presence of mold, with the couple claiming the insurance company refused to cover the cost of damages, that their infant son needed medical attention after sleeping in a mold-infested room, and that they refused to relocate the family to a temporary home.

Buchholz was introduced to Clubine by Donald Trump at an event Trump hosted after a UFC fight in Anaheim, California in 2008. Their wedding was held at Trump National Golf Club in Rancho Palos Verdes, California; Trump did not attend but "footed a significant bulk of the tab."

Buchholz is a distant relative of former Major League Baseball pitcher Taylor Buchholz.

== See also ==
- List of Major League Baseball no-hitters

Preceded by Justin Verlander	No-hitter pitcher September 1, 2007	Succeeded by Jon Lester
