= Lumberton High School =

Lumberton High School may refer to:

- Lumberton High School (Mississippi)
- Lumberton High School (North Carolina)
- Lumberton High School (Texas)
