= Village Creek State Park (Texas) =

State park in Texas, United States

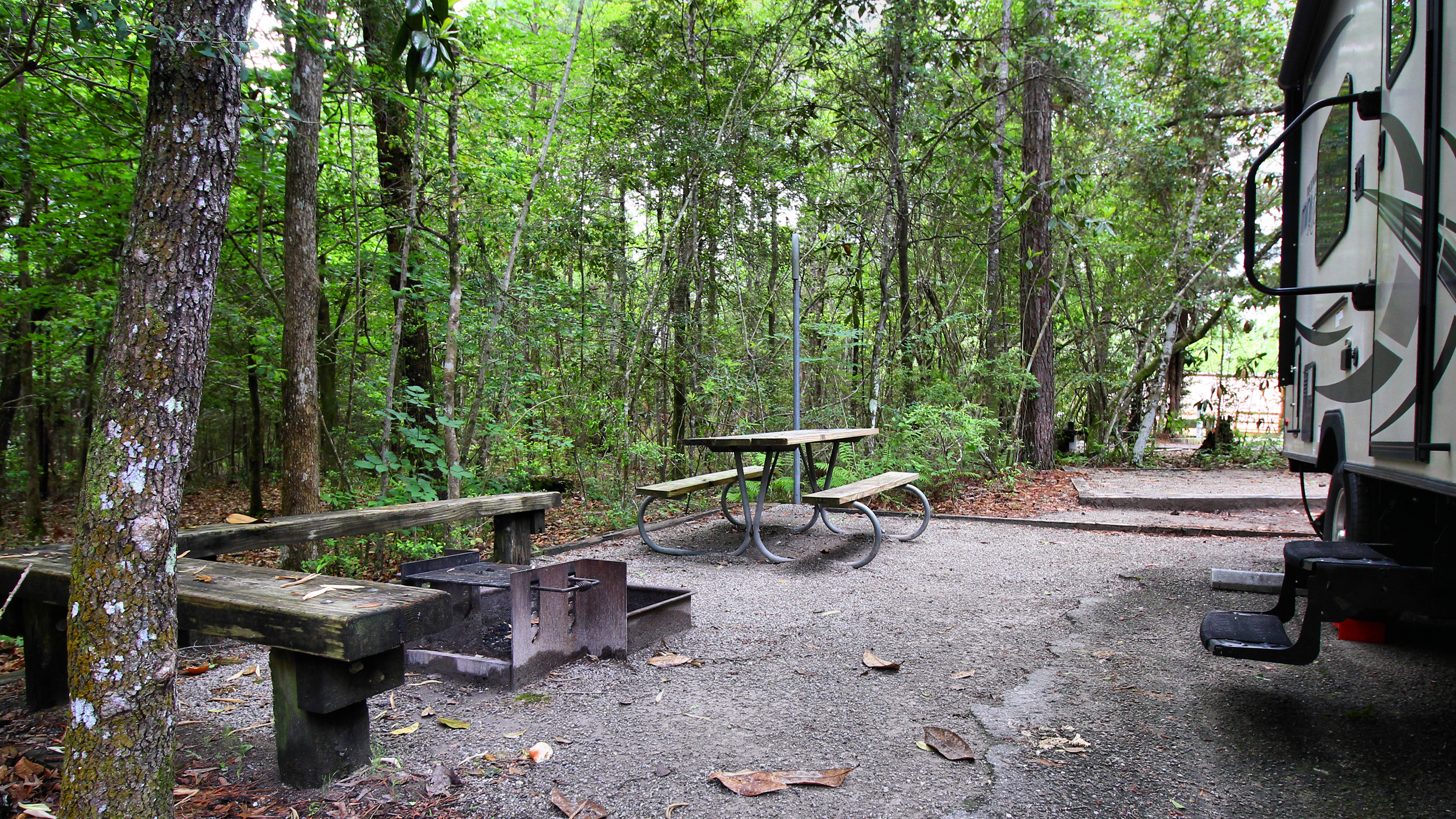
- A campsite in the park

- Location within Texas Location within the United States
- Location: Hardin County, Texas
- Nearest city: Lumberton
- Coordinates: 30°15′19″N 94°09′42″W
- Area: 2,466 acres (998 ha)
- Established: 1994
- Visitors: 30,733 (in 2025)
- Governing body: Texas Parks and Wildlife Department
- Website: Park website

Village Creek State Park is a 2,466-acre (998 ha) state park in the Piney Woods of eastern Texas in the Hardin County city of Lumberton. The State of Texas acquired the land for the heavily forested park in 1979 and the park opened in 1994. It is managed by the Texas Parks and Wildlife Department. It is named for Village Creek, a sand-bottomed, free-flowing tributary of the Neches River.

== Nature ==
Village Creek State Park is in a floodplain, covered in bottomland hardwood forest, cypress dome, water tupelo swamps, and bayheads.

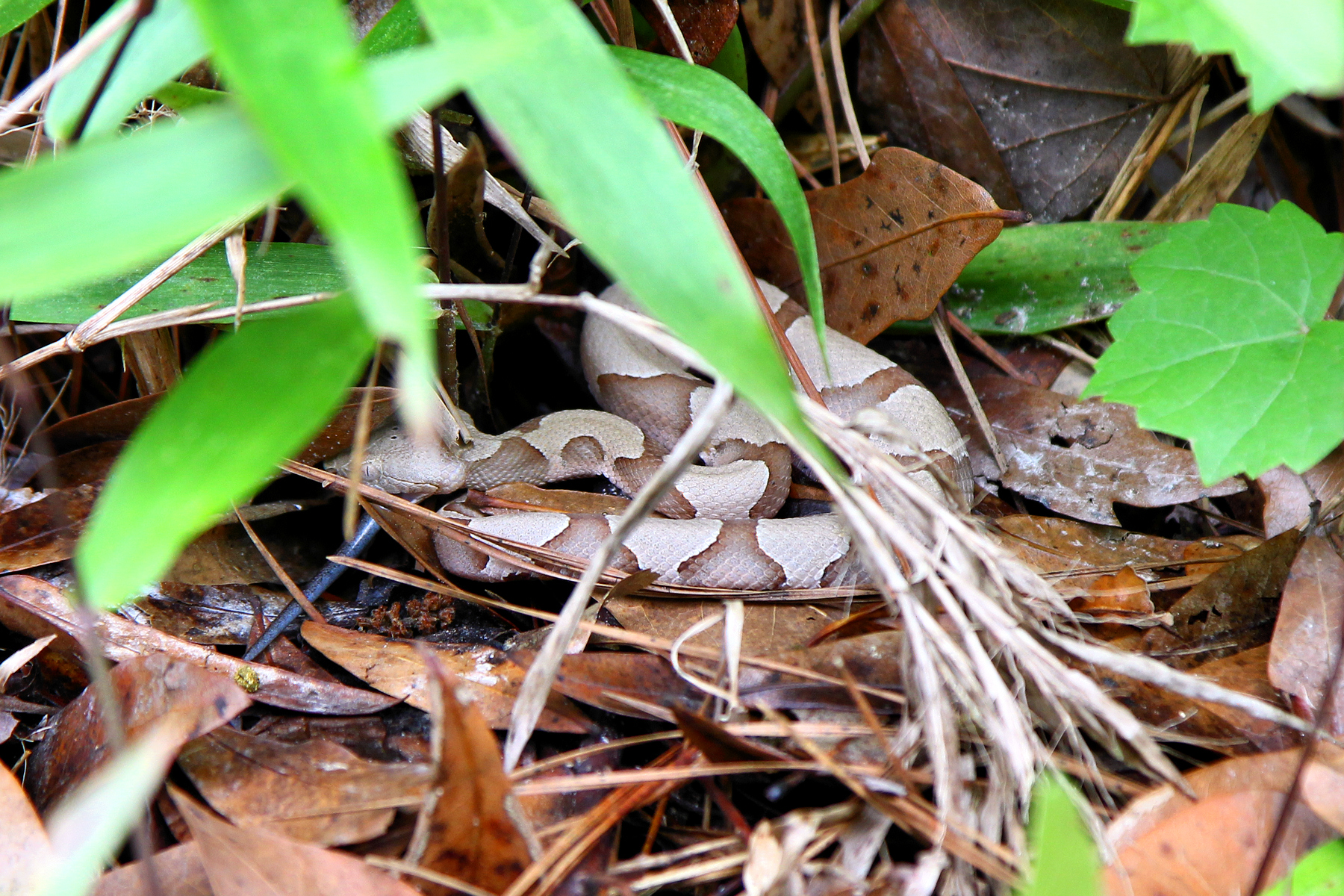
An eastern copperhead devours its meal.

=== Animals ===
Wildlife includes white-tailed deer, Virginia opossum, swamp rabbit, diamondback water snake, eastern copperhead, Gulf Coast toad and snapping turtle. Two large colorful spiders in the park are the yellow garden spider and the golden silk orb-weaver.

Fishing includes channel catfish, bass, crappie, and bluegill.

=== Plants ===
The forested area includes bald cypress, river birch, riverflat hawthorn, and yaupon holly trees. The park has a longleaf pine restoration project in progress.

== Accommodations ==
The park offers 25 water and electric campsites for recreational vehicles (RV) or tents, 15 walk-in primitive tent campsites, a group primitive campsite, restrooms with showers and a dump station.

== Recreation ==
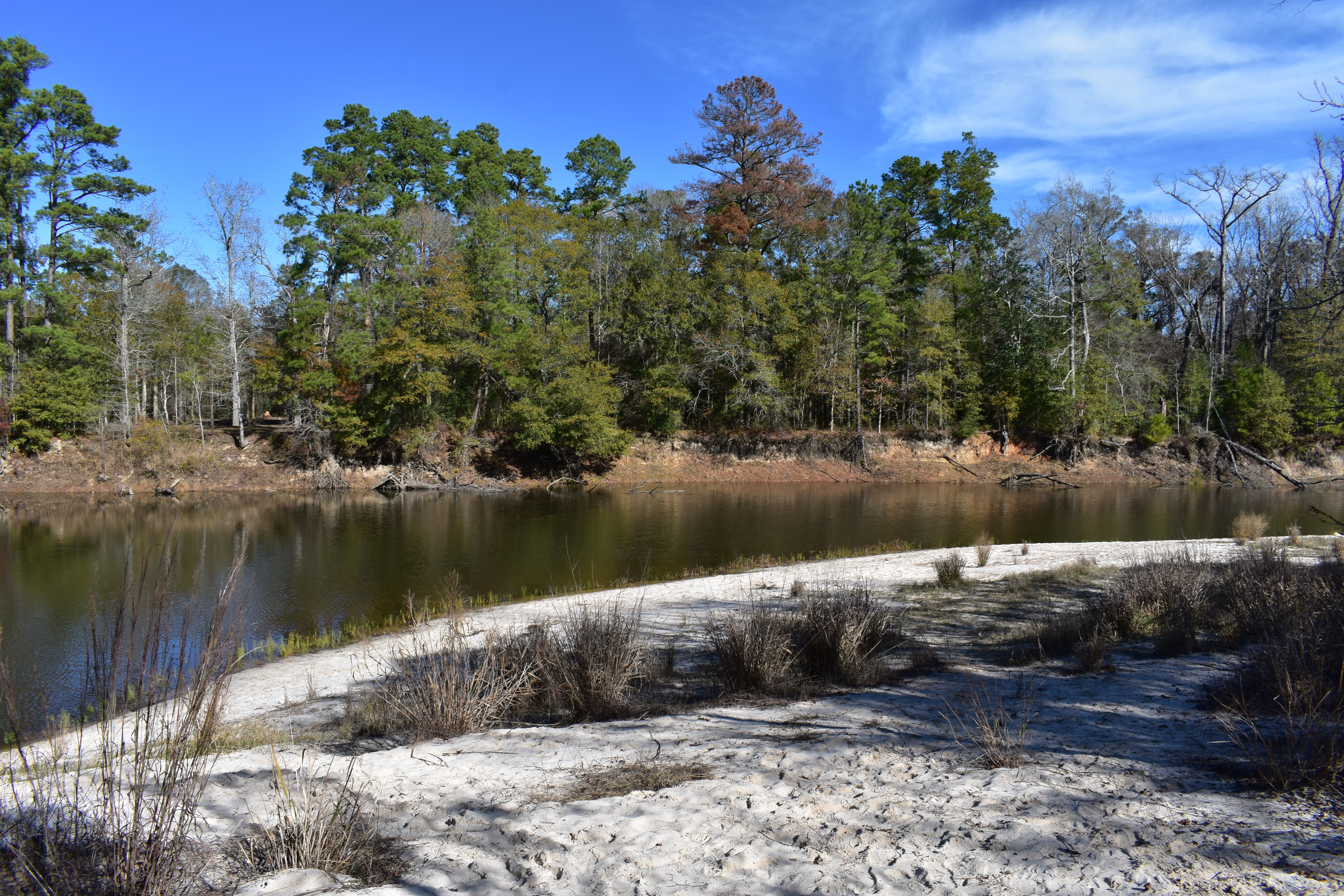
Village Creek swimming hole

Recreational activities include swimming, canoeing and fishing in Village Creek, hiking and cycling on eight miles of trails, and picnicking in the day use area which also has a group picnic pavilion. There is also a nature center on site with interpretive displays.

== See also ==
- List of Texas state parks
