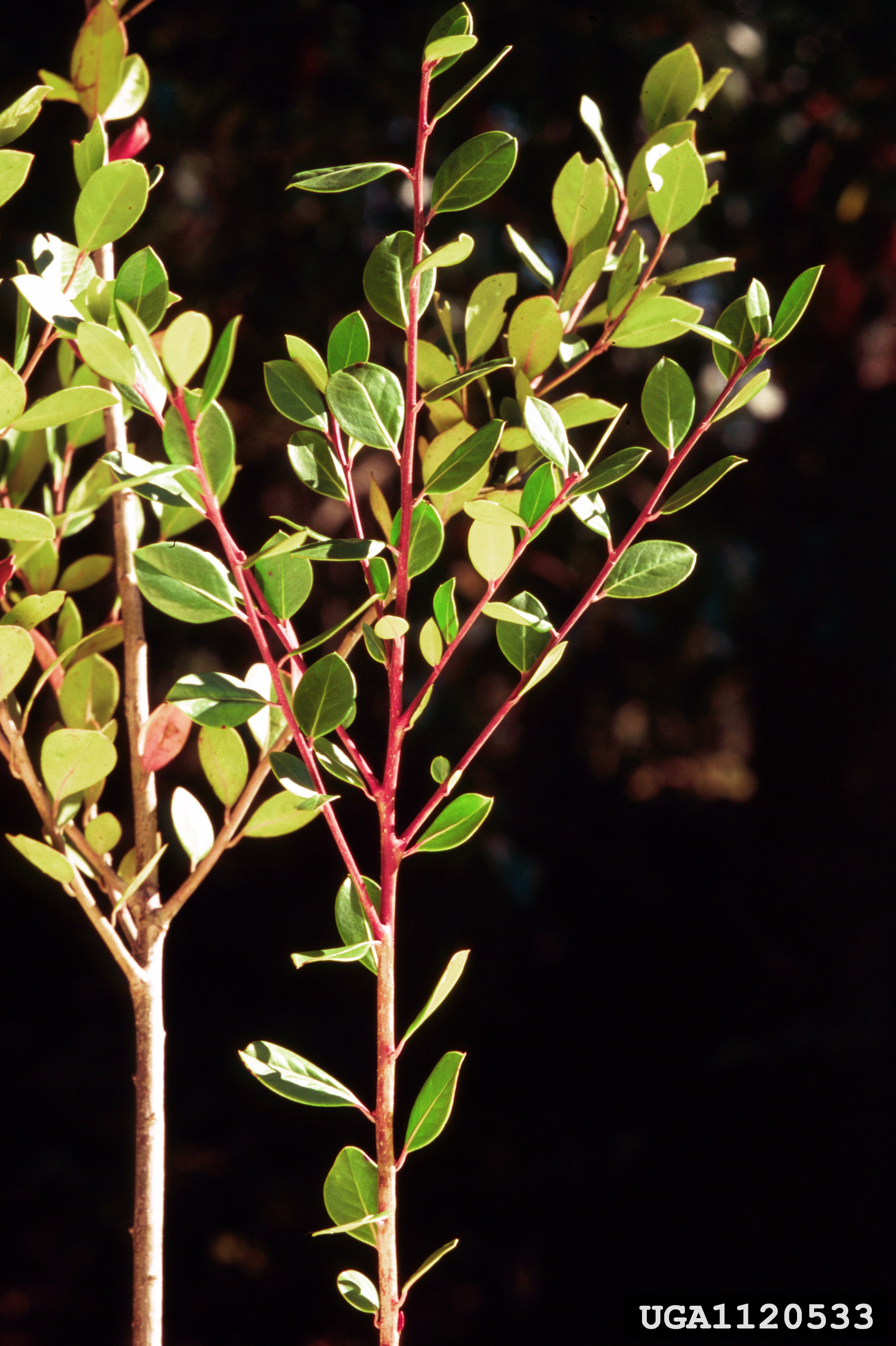

Conservation status
- Least Concern (IUCN 3.1)

Scientific classification
- Kingdom: Plantae
- Clade: Tracheophytes
- Clade: Angiosperms
- Clade: Eudicots
- Clade: Asterids
- Order: Aquifoliales
- Family: Aquifoliaceae
- Genus: Ilex
- Species: I. coriacea

Binomial name
- Ilex coriacea (Pursh) Chapm.
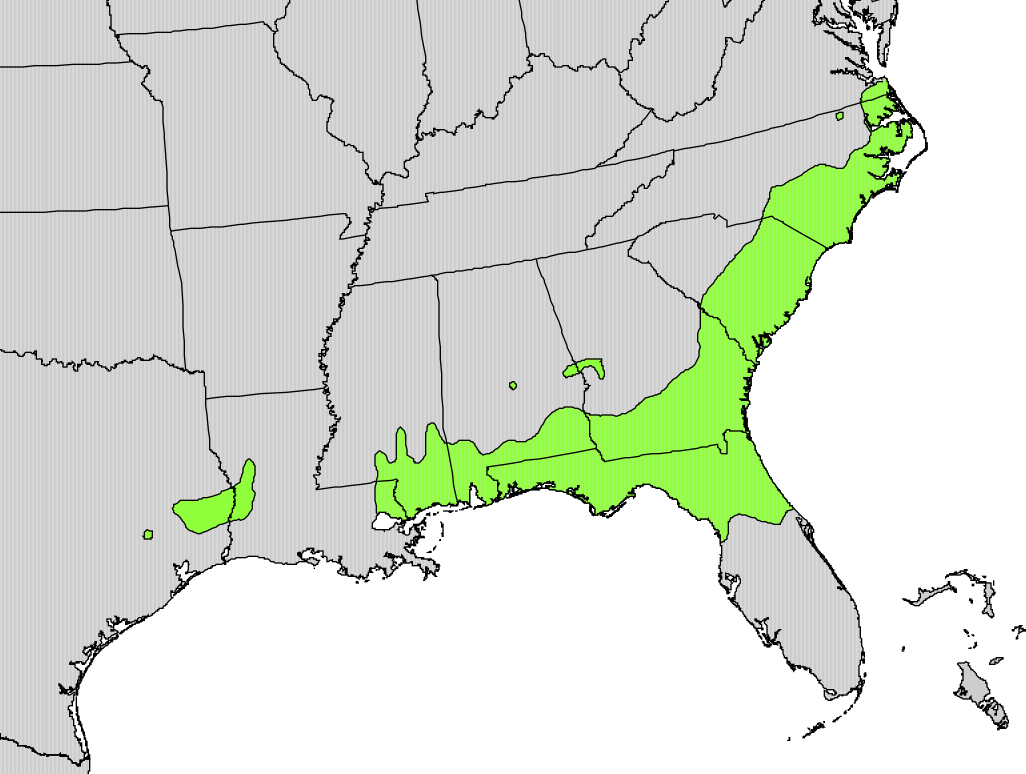
- Natural range

= Ilex coriacea =

Species of holly

Ilex coriacea, sometimes known as large gallberry or sweet gallberry, is a shrub in the holly family native to coastal areas in the United States from Virginia to Texas. It exists primarily as an understory plant in pine forests, and is sometimes managed by controlled burnings, resprouting from rhizomes.

Ilex coriacea is a facultative wetland plant and can be found in sandy, moist to wet soils in bogs, at the edges of ponds and in seepage swamps called baygalls. It is planted as an ornamental and prefers acidic soils.

The plant is an important nectar source for beekeepers.
