= Big Sandy Creek (Village Creek tributary) =

Stream in southeastern Texas, US

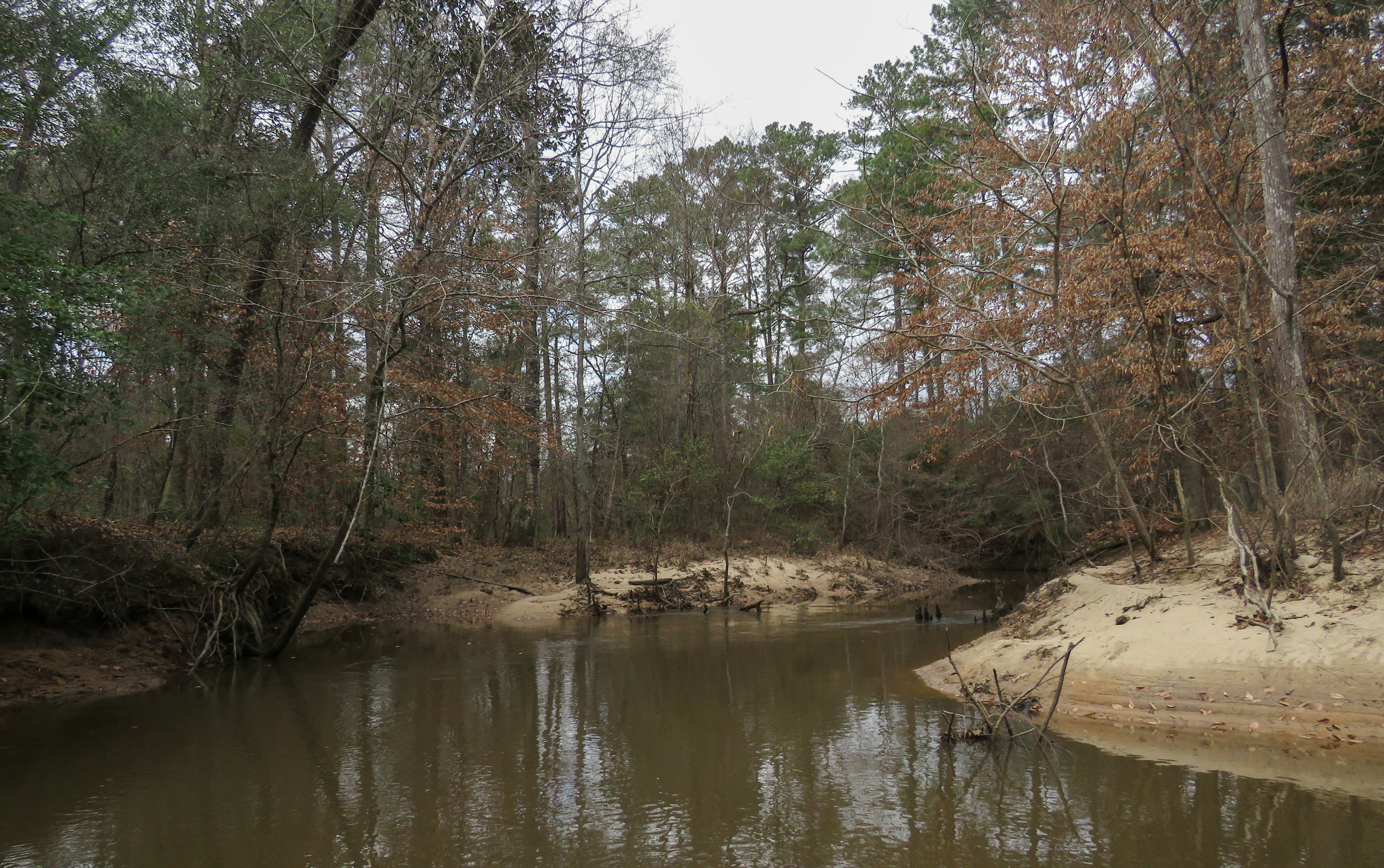

Location
- Country: United States
- State: Texas

Physical characteristics
- Source
  - location: Central Polk County, Southeast of the community of Moscow
  - coordinates: 30°52′23″N 94°47′44″W
- Mouth
  - location: Village Creek outside of Village Mills, Hardin County
  - coordinates: 30°30′08″N 94°26′03″W

Big Sandy Creek is a stream in Texas, United States. It rises in Polk County before flowing approximately 40 miles (64 km) southeast into Hardin County where it merges with Kimball Creek, forming Village Creek. Long sections of the creek pass through the Big Thicket National Preserve. The 14,343 acres (58.04 km^{2}) Big Sandy Creek unit is named after the stream. The creek also passes through the Alabama-Coushatta Reservation east of Livingston.

== Ecology and wildlife ==
Bottomland hardwood forests and beech-magnolia-loblolly slope forests can be found in the stream's floodplain, while pine savannas occupy the adjacent uplands. Common tree species seen in the bottomlands include sweetgum (Liquidambar styraciflua), swamp chestnut oak (Quercus michauxii), hornbeam (Carpinus caroliniana), Hollies (Ilex sp.), and bald cypress (Taxodium distichum).

Outside of the national preserve, the Alabama-Coushatta people manage and protect longleaf pine ecosystems on their land. Prescribed fire and reforestation efforts protect greater than 400 acres (1.6 km^{2}) of forest dominated by Longleaf Pine (Pinus palustris), an important cultural symbol used in basket weaving.

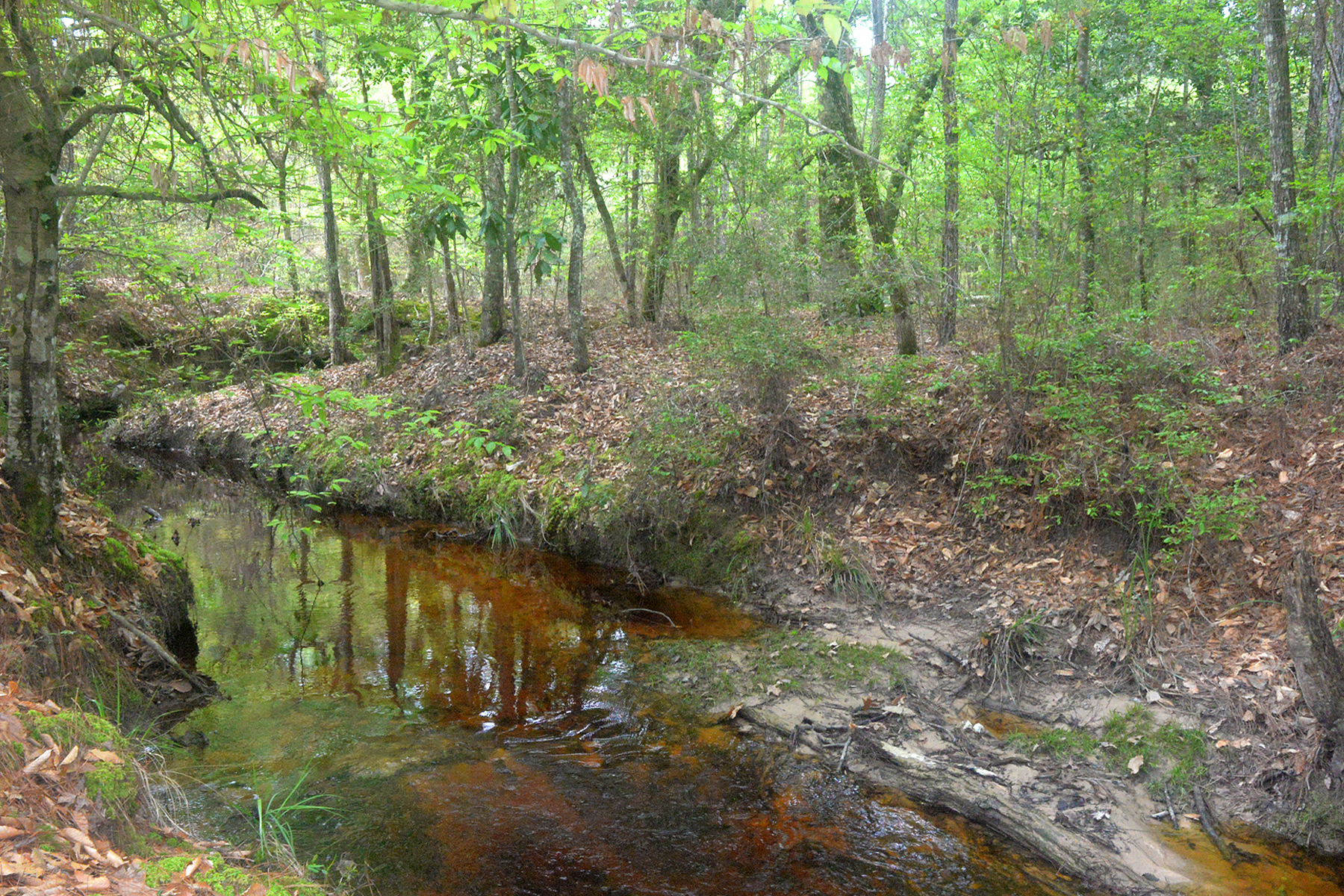
A blackwater tributary of the Creek passing through a slope forest in the Big Thicket National Preserve, Big Sandy Creek Unit

== See also ==
- List of rivers of Texas
- Village Creek
- Big Thicket
