= Lumberton High School (Texas) =

Coordinates: 30.2556°N 94.2179°W

Location
- 103 South LHS Dr; Lumberton, Texas 77657; United States

Information
- Established: 1967
- Principal: Dr. Paul Goebel
- Teaching staff: 84.36 (on an FTE basis)
- Grades: 9–12
- Enrollment: 1,233 (2024–25)
- Student to teacher ratio: 14.60
- Colors: Columbia blue, red, and white
- Team name: Raiders
- Website: lhs.lumbertonisd.org

Lumberton High School is a public high school in Lumberton, Texas, serving students in grades 9–12. It is the only high school operated by the Lumberton Independent School District. A limited number of out-of-district students may enroll for an annual tuition fee of $3,000 per student.

Lumberton High School is located at 103 LHS Drive on the west side of Lumberton along Highway 69. Lumberton Middle School is situated adjacent to the high school, with the Performing Arts Center located between the two schools.

== History ==
The Lumberton Independent School District was established in 1967 from the Chance-Loeb school district, which had previously served children through grade 8 in the area. The first high school was built that same year under the direction of school board members Kenneth R. Kirkendall, Jim Stinson, and Ross Iles, at which time the school was renamed Lumberton. That original building, located on US Highway 96, now houses Lumberton Middle School. The current high school opened in the fall of 1979 on Highway 69 on the west side of Lumberton.

A tree stands in front of the school as a memorial to five students who died in a car crash in May 1998.

In 2019, Lumberton voters approved a $79 million bond measure to fund improvements across four campuses. The project was completed in 2023 and included new security systems and an interactive media center at every campus, as well as a new culinary arts facility at the high school.

In 2023, the school adopted a modified four-day school week.

== Controversies ==
=== Geography lessons ===
In 2013, there was widespread controversy over a geography lesson that utilized Burqas and other clothing worn in muslim countries.

=== Cheerleading routine ===
In 2015, there was a national controversy over the cheerleaders performance to the sounds of 9/11.

=== Armed teachers ===
In 2018, the school made accommodations for some teachers to be armed with guns.

=== Racial demographics ===
As of 2022, fewer than 5 of the 1,109 students were Black.

== Academics ==
For the 2018–2019 school year, Lumberton HS was given a Texas Academic Performance Report rating of "B" by the Texas Education Agency.

=== Teacher experience ===
	Lumberton HS	State Average
Average Years Teaching	11.7	11.1
First Year Teachers	6.8%	7.0%

=== Average class size ===
Subject	Lumberton HS	State Average
English	19.1	16.6
Foreign Language	20.2	18.9
Math	20.1	17.8
Science	21.3	18.9
Social Studies	20.2	19.3

== Athletics ==
Lumberton High School competes in the University Interscholastic League (UIL)] as a Class 4A Division I school. The school's teams compete under the name the Raiders, with the mascot represented by the cartoon character Yosemite Sam. The official school colors are Columbia blue, red, and silver. The school fields varsity teams in baseball, basketball, cross country, football, golf, powerlifting soccer, softball, swimming, tennis, track and field, and volleyball.

The cheerleading program has been the school's most decorated athletic program in recent years. The squad finished as state runner-up in 2019 and 2020, then won back-to-back UIL Class 4A Division I State Spirit Championships in 2021 and 2022. The program also captured UCA Regional Championships in 2020 and 2021, and won the UCA National High School Cheerleading Championship in 2026.

== Notable alumni ==
- Clay Buchholz (2003), former MLB All-Star pitcher
- Trey Mitchell (2012), strongman
- Brandon Young (2016), pitcher for the Baltimore Orioles
