= Bayhead =

Swamp habitat where bay laurels predominate

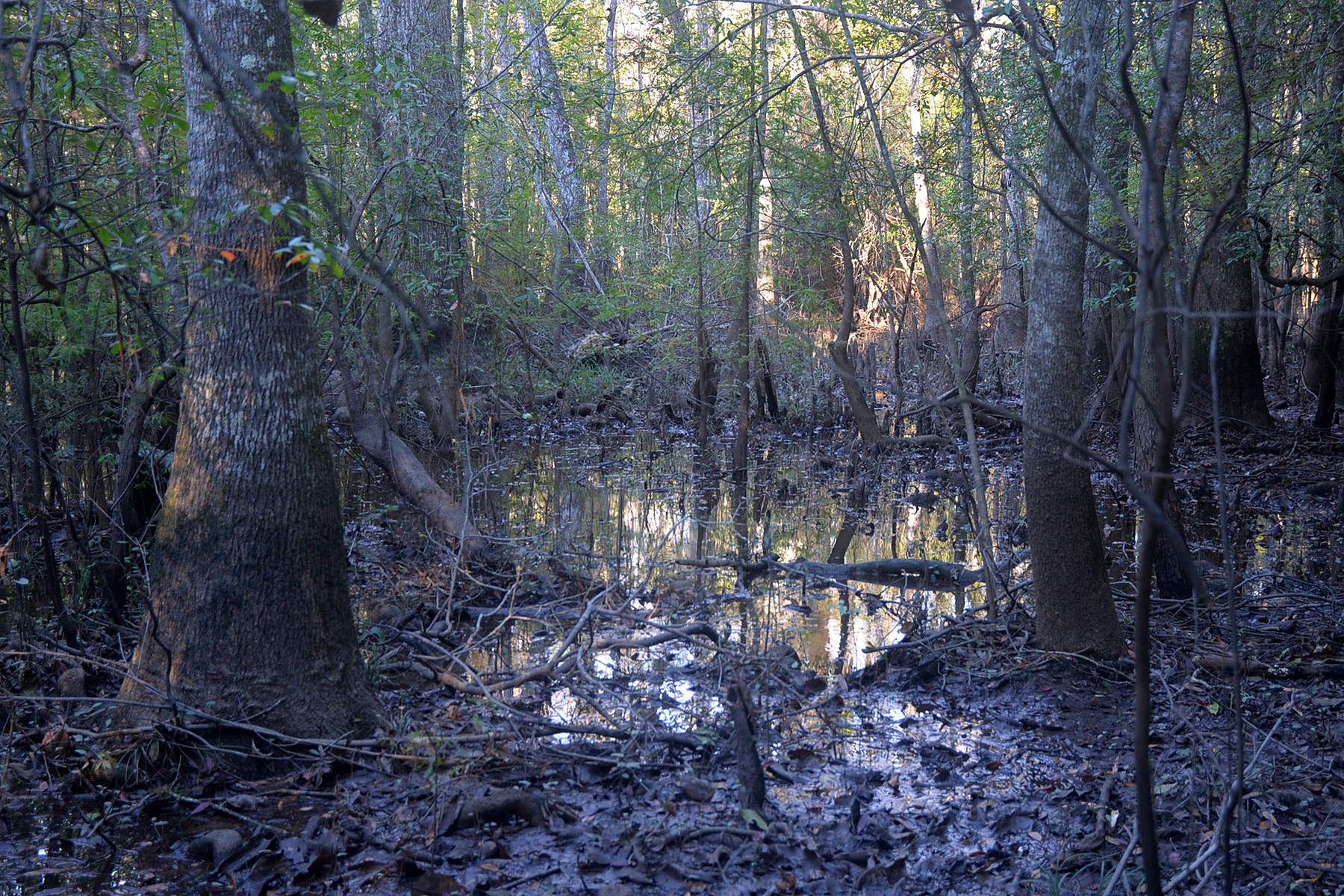
A baygall in the Big Thicket National Preserve, Jack Gore Baygall Unit, Hardin County, Texas; 6 November 2019

A bayhead or baygall is a type of wetland or swamp habitat. The name baygall is derived from sweetbay magnolia (Magnolia virginiana) and sweet gallberry holly (Ilex coriacea). Baygalls are recognized as a discrete ecosystem by ecologists and the swamps have been described as "distinct wetland communities in the Natural Communities of Louisiana". Baygall swamps are most often found in the low lying margins of floodplains and bottomlands with little or poor drainage to the main creek, bayou, or river channel. Baygall or bayhead swamps found on slopes and hillsides are sometimes referred to as a forest seep or hanging bogs. Hanging bogs are typically found in hardwood-pine forests. Most baygall swamps are semi-permanently saturated, or flooded.

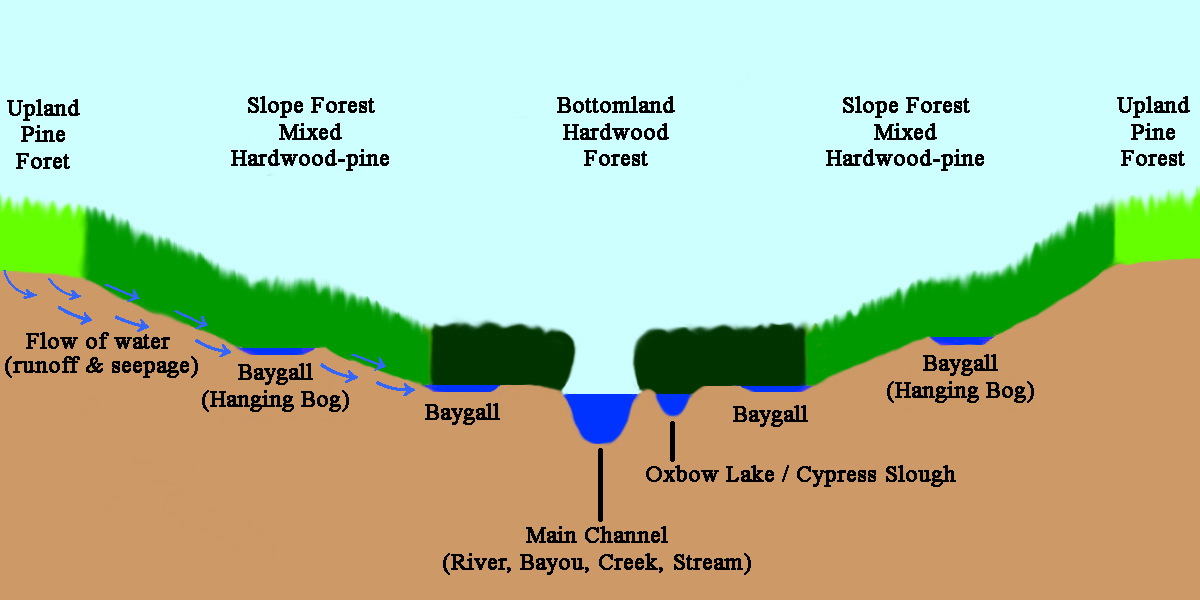
Baygalls are relatively shallow wetlands that typically form on the terraces of forest slopes or on the margins of floodplains.

The characteristics of a bayhead swamp are mostly broad, shallow drains, which can be found near margins of bottomlands and floodplains with little or no drainage. They most often receive a slow, but steady supply of water from seepage at the base of slopes and bluffs. Baygalls are relatively shallow wetlands, ranging from wet and saturated soils and leaf litter, to a few inches of stagnate or very slowly moving water, although some may occasionally be deeper depending on topography and rainfall. Most are also under closed or nearly closed canopies. Occasionally, larger and deeper baygalls may have open water at the center with floating vegetation such as the fragrant water-lily (Nymphaea odorata).

High acidity levels distinguish baygalls from other wetlands and they often support plant communities that are distinct from those of adjacent areas. Sphagnum moss is often associated with baygalls. Sometimes referred to as acid bog baygalls, baygalls typically have very low pH levels. Levels as low as 4.5 are not uncommon in the baygalls of the Big Thicket region of Southeast Texas, USA. The acidic waters that drain from baygalls can contribute significantly to blackwater rivers and creeks in the bottomlands. A baygall may be no more than a small pool or they can be a mile across. The Jack Gore Baygall Unit of the Big Thicket National Preserve at 12 square miles is said to be is the largest in the world.

== Flora ==
Baygalls are typically found in densely forested areas. Over-story trees associated with baygalls include baldcypress (Taxodium distichum), swamp tupelo or swamp blackgum (Nyssa biflora), red maple (Acer rubrum), green ash (Fraxinus pennsylvanica), laurel oak (Quercus laurifolia), water oak (Quercus nigra), sweetgum (Liquidambar styraciflua), and sweetbay (Magnolia virginiana). Longleaf pine (Pinus palustris) are usually associated with hanging bogs or forest seeps.

Understory species include smooth or hazel alder (Alnus serrulata), swamp titi or leatherwood (Cyrilla racemiflora), sweet gallberry (Ilex coriacea), American holly (Ilex opaca), Virginia willow or sweetspire (Itea virginica), wax-myrtle (Morella cerifera), red bay (Persea borbonia), swamp redbay (Persea palustris), bamboo-vine (Smilax laurifolia), poison sumac (Toxicodendron vernix), possum-haw viburnum (Viburnum nudum), muscadine grape (Vitis rotundifolia).

Ferns such as net-veined chain fern (Lorinseria [Woodwardia areolata] areolata), sensitive fern (Onoclea sensibilis), cinnamon fern (Osmunda cinnamomea), and royal fern (Osmunda spectabilis) may be found in the herbaceous layer. Several species of orchid (Orchidaceae) are also associated with baygalls.

== Species of conservation concern ==
The baygall swamps have around 20 animal species which are considered to be endangered or of conservation concern in various states and countries.

Butterflies

- Pepper and salt skipper (Amblyscirtes hegon)
- Falcate orangetip (Anthocharis midea)
- Harvester (Feniseca tarquinius)

Amphibians

- Southern dusky salamander (Desmognathus auriculatus)
- Mud salamander (Pseudotriton montanus)

Mammals

- Southeastern shrew (Sorex longirostris)
- Southeastern myotis (Myotis austroriparius)
- Long-tailed weasel (Neogale frenata)

Birds

- American woodcock (Scolopax minor)
- Yellow-billed cuckoo (Coccyzus americanus)
- Wood thrush (Hylocichla mustelina)
- Yellow-throated vireo (Vireo flavifrons)
- Northern parula (Setophaga americana)
- Prothonotary warbler (Protonotaria citrea)
- Swainson's warbler (Limnothlypis swainsonii)
- Kentucky warbler (Geothlypis formosa)
- Hooded warbler (Setophaga citrina)
- Painted bunting (Passerina ciris)
- Rusty blackbird (Euphagus carolinus)
- Orchard oriole (Icterus spurius)
