= Lumberton, Texas =

- Town
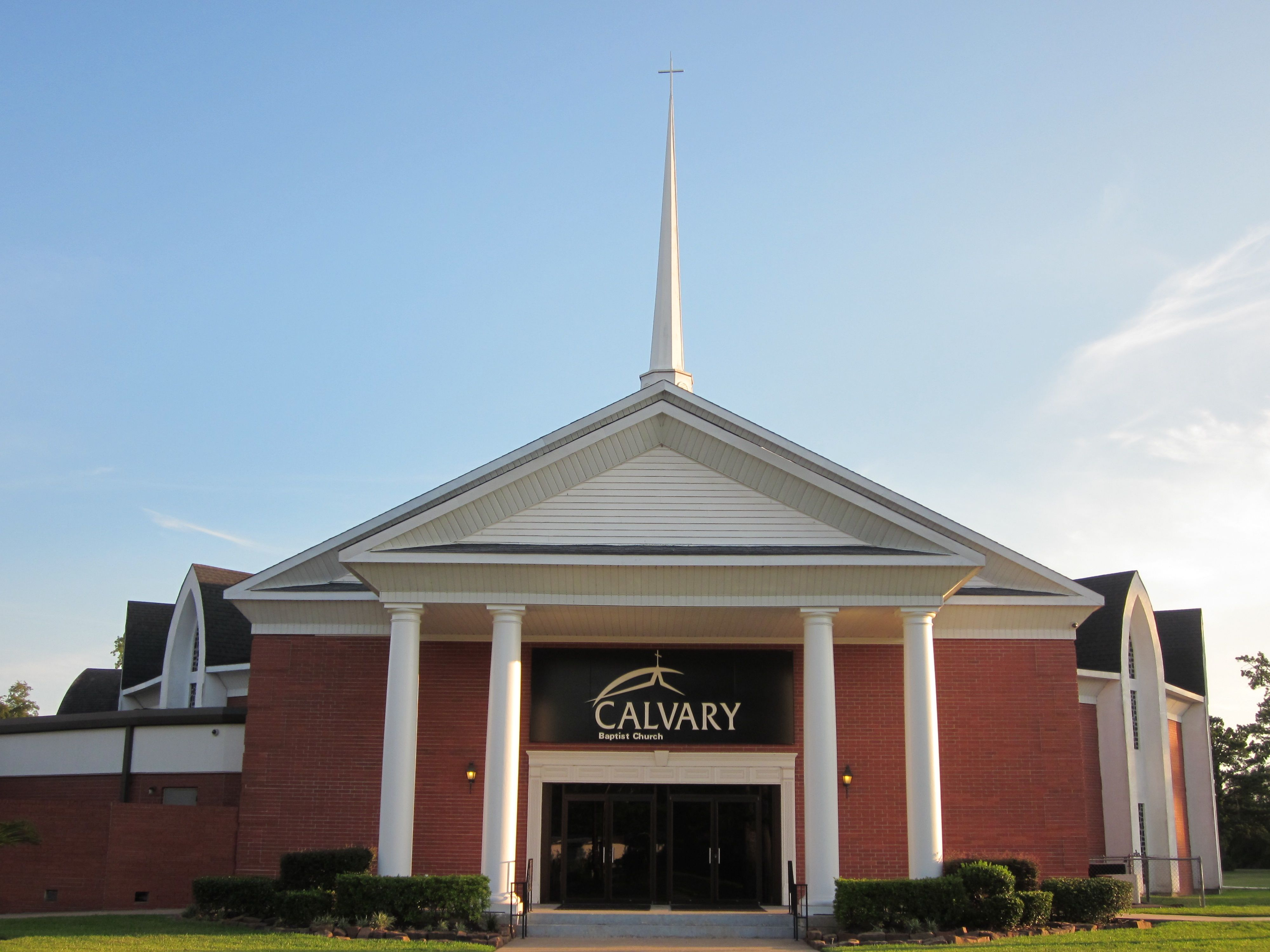
- Calvary Baptist Church North Campus at Lumberton

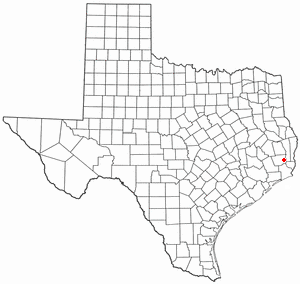
- Location of Lumberton, Texas

- Coordinates: 30°14′10″N 94°13′47″W
- Country: United States
- State: Texas
- County: Hardin

Government
  - Type: Mayor–council government
  - Mayor: Donald Surratt

Area
  - Total: 13.51 sq mi (34.99 km^{2})
  - Land: 13.41 sq mi (34.73 km^{2})
  - Water: 0.10 sq mi (0.26 km^{2})
- Elevation: 46 ft (14 m)

Population (2020)
  - Total: 13,554
  - Density: 975/sq mi (376.4/km^{2})
- Time zone: UTC-6 (Central (CST))
  - Summer (DST): UTC-5 (CDT)
- ZIP code: 77657
- Area code: 409
- FIPS code: 48-45120
- GNIS feature ID: 2410897
- Website: cityoflumberton.com

Lumberton is a town in Hardin County, Texas, United States. The population was 13,557 at the 2020 census, up from 11,943 at the 2010 census. Lumberton is the home of Village Creek State Park. The town is part of the Beaumont–Port Arthur metropolitan area.

== Historical development ==
The town was established as a stop on the Gulf, Beaumont and Kansas City Railway that was built through the area in 1894. Serving the local sawmills and lumber camps, the post office was established at Lumberton in 1909. In 1914, the post office was relocated to the Fletcher site nearby, which was a major sawmill until the mid-1920s. After the closure of the sawmill at Fletcher, the area remained populated and became part of the city of Lumberton when it was first incorporated in July 1973 when the towns city limits were within Beaumont's jurisdiction; however, two years later in 1975 Beaumont filed two lawsuits challenging Lumberton's right to exist. One lawsuit was with the State of Texas, the other lawsuit was locally. The official judgement declared Lumberton a non-city. Lumberton was able to re-incorporate with new boundaries. Those boundaries are the existing boundaries today which put the city limits at the split between Highway96/69 on the South end and on the North end at Village Creek. At the time this happened the Mayor of Lumberton was Dannis Robinson and the lawyer was Kenneth Furlow.

== Geography ==
Lumberton is located in southeastern Hardin County. According to the United States Census Bureau, the city has a total area of 13.4 square miles (34.7 km^{2}), of which 13.3 square miles (34.4 km^{2}) are land and 0.1 square miles (0.3 km^{2}), or 0.77%, are water. The eastern border of the city is Village Creek, a southeastward-flowing tributary of the Neches River.

The Eastex Freeway (comprising US 69, 96, and US 287) runs north from Beaumont to the southern border of Lumberton, where it splits into two separate highways, both running north to south, with Highway 96 in the eastern portion of the city and Highways 69 and 287 in the western portion. The two highways house the majority of the commercial development on the city. US 96 leads north-northeast 7 miles (11 km) to Silsbee, while Highway 69/287 leads northwest 11 miles (18 km) to Kountze, the Hardin County seat. Beaumont is 12 miles (19 km) to the south.

=== Climate ===
The climate in this area is characterized by hot, humid summers and generally mild to cool winters. According to the Köppen climate classification system, Lumberton has a humid subtropical climate, Cfa on climate maps.

Climate data for Lumberton, Texas (1991–2020)
| Month | Jan | Feb | Mar | Apr | May | Jun | Jul | Aug | Sep | Oct | Nov | Dec | Year |
|---|---|---|---|---|---|---|---|---|---|---|---|---|---|
| Mean daily maximum °F (°C) | 61.6 (16.4) | 65.9 (18.8) | 72.9 (22.7) | 78.9 (26.1) | 85.7 (29.8) | 90.4 (32.4) | 92.6 (33.7) | 93.4 (34.1) | 88.8 (31.6) | 80.5 (26.9) | 70.9 (21.6) | 62.7 (17.1) | 78.7 (25.9) |
| Daily mean °F (°C) | 50.5 (10.3) | 54.7 (12.6) | 61.9 (16.6) | 67.3 (19.6) | 75.1 (23.9) | 80.8 (27.1) | 82.9 (28.3) | 83.1 (28.4) | 78.4 (25.8) | 68.9 (20.5) | 59.3 (15.2) | 51.8 (11.0) | 67.9 (19.9) |
| Mean daily minimum °F (°C) | 39.4 (4.1) | 43.5 (6.4) | 50.9 (10.5) | 55.7 (13.2) | 64.5 (18.1) | 71.1 (21.7) | 73.1 (22.8) | 72.7 (22.6) | 68.0 (20.0) | 57.2 (14.0) | 47.7 (8.7) | 41.0 (5.0) | 57.1 (13.9) |
| Average precipitation inches (mm) | 5.23 (133) | 4.05 (103) | 3.67 (93) | 4.49 (114) | 5.03 (128) | 6.92 (176) | 5.23 (133) | 6.01 (153) | 5.57 (141) | 6.05 (154) | 5.39 (137) | 5.59 (142) | 63.23 (1,607) |
| Average snowfall inches (cm) | 0.0 (0.0) | 0.0 (0.0) | 0.0 (0.0) | 0.0 (0.0) | 0.0 (0.0) | 0.0 (0.0) | 0.0 (0.0) | 0.0 (0.0) | 0.0 (0.0) | 0.0 (0.0) | 0.0 (0.0) | 0.2 (0.51) | 0.2 (0.51) |
Source: NOAA

== Demographics ==
Historical population
| Census | Pop. | Note | %± |
|---|---|---|---|
| 1980 | 2,480 | | — |
| 1990 | 6,640 | | 167.7% |
| 2000 | 8,731 | | 31.5% |
| 2010 | 11,943 | | 36.8% |
| 2020 | 13,554 | | 13.5% |
U.S. Decennial Census

Lumberton racial composition as of 2020 (NH = Non-Hispanic) (Note: Note: the US Census treats Hispanic/Latino as an ethnic category. This table excludes Latinos from the racial categories and assigns them to a separate category. Hispanics/Latinos can be of any race.)
| Race | Number | Percentage |
|---|---|---|
| White (NH) | 11,755 | 86.73% |
| Black or African American (NH) | 74 | 0.55% |
| Native American or Alaska Native (NH) | 49 | 0.36% |
| Asian (NH) | 163 | 1.2% |
| Pacific Islander (NH) | 6 | 0.04% |
| Some Other Race (NH) | 32 | 0.24% |
| Mixed/Multi-Racial (NH) | 504 | 3.72% |
| Hispanic or Latino | 971 | 7.16% |
| Total | 13,554 | |

As of the 2020 United States census, there were 13,554 people, 4,920 households, and 3,812 families residing in the city.

As of the 2010 census Lumberton had a population of 11,943. The ethnic and racial makeup of the population was 92.9% non-Hispanic white, 0.4% African American, 0.3% Native American, 0.7% Asian, 1.0% some other race, and 1.3% reporting two or more races.

As of the census of 2000, 8,731 people, 3,198 households, and 2,542 families resided in the city. The population density was 928.5 inhabitants per square mile (358.5/km^{2}). The 3,443 housing units averaged 366.2 per square mile (141.4/km^{2}). The racial makeup of the city was 97.64% White, 0.05% African American, 0.29% Native American, 0.21% Asian, 0.87% from other races, and 0.95% from two or more races. Hispanics or Latinos of any race were 2.79% of the population.

Of the 3,198 households, 42.6% had children under the age of 18 living with them, 66.4% were married couples living together, 9.9% had a female householder with no husband present, and 20.5% were not families; 17.8% of all households were made up of individuals, and 6.1% had someone living alone who was 65 years of age or older. The average household size was 2.73 and the average family size was 3.09.

In the city, the population was distributed as 29.1% under the age of 18, 9.0% from 18 to 24, 30.3% from 25 to 44, 22.8% from 45 to 64, and 8.7% who were 65 years of age or older. The median age was 34 years. For every 100 females, there were 93.1 males. For every 100 females age 18 and over, there were 91.4 males.

The median income for a household in the city was $45,700, and for a family was $47,184. Males had a median income of $38,315 versus $26,217 for females. The per capita income for the city was $19,650. About 5.5% of families and 7.0% of the population were below the poverty line, including 8.0% of those under age 18 and 5.0% of those age 65 or over.

In 2005, the estimated average value of a home in Lumberton was $111,700. The crime index rate for Lumberton in 2006 was 154.6. This is well below the national average of 325.2.

Lumberton is a rapidly growing community, and is the largest city in Hardin County. Many of the newest and largest subdivisions that are considered by many as part of Lumberton are actually outside of the city limits and not included in the official city population totals.

== Culture ==
Lumberton is the home of Village Creek State Park, which attracts tourists from all over the states of Texas and Louisiana. Every year, the Village Creek Festival is held in Lumberton.

== Education ==
Lumberton is served by the Lumberton Independent School District. The athletic teams of Lumberton High School are known as the Raiders and compete in Division 1 4A.

== Notable people ==
- Clay Buchholz, pitcher for the Arizona Diamondbacks
- Debra Jo Fondren, 1978 Playboy Playmate of the year
- Trey Mitchell, America's Strongest Man in 2018

Brandon Young Brandon Wayne Young (born August 19, 1998) is an American professional baseball pitcher for the Baltimore Orioles of Major League Baseball (MLB). He made his MLB debut in 2025. Young attended Lumberton High School in Lumberton, Texas, graduating in 2016.[1] He played college baseball for two seasons for Howard College and two seasons for the University of Louisiana at Lafayette.[2] On July 8 2025, Young threw an immaculate inning against the New York Mets, becoming the 4th in Orioles history and the first since Kevin Gausman in 2018. He struck out Jesse Winker, Jeff McNeil, and Luis Torrens. On August 15, 2025, Young got his first win and threw a perfect game through 7+2/3 innings in a game against the Houston Astros

== Notable events ==
In October 1994, heavy rains (10–25 inches in five days) resulted in a severe flood over southeastern portions of Texas which damaged and destroyed homes across the region and resulted in 22 flood-related deaths. Lumberton suffered significant property damage, particularly in the Pine Island Bayou and Village Creek areas.

In 2005, Lumberton resident Mike Smith was elected to the LISD School Board at the age of 19. Smith became the youngest individual to be on a board of education in the state of Texas. In April 2007, Smith became the youngest man to testify in front of the Texas House of Representatives during the 2007 legislative session.

On September 24, 2005, Lumberton made national headlines after suffering a direct hit from Hurricane Rita; on September 13, 2008, Lumberton made national headlines again for having another direct hit from Hurricane Ike. On August 28, 2017, Hurricane Harvey hit Lumberton and approximately half of the community was submerged again.
