= Lumberton Independent School District =

Public school district in Texas, United States

Address
- 121 South Main Lumberton, Texas, 77657; United States
- Coordinates: 30.2550°N 94.1979°W

District information
- Type: Public
- Grades: PK–12
- Superintendent: John Mathews
- Schools: 6
- NCES District ID: 4813530

Students and staff
- Students: 4,197 (2023–2024)
- Teachers: 277.46 (on an FTE basis) (2023–2024)
- Staff: 296.60 (on an FTE basis) (2023–2024)
- Student–teacher ratio: 15.13 (2023–2024)

Other information
- Website: www.lumbertonisd.org

Lumberton Independent School District is a public school district based in Lumberton, Texas (USA). In addition to Lumberton, the district serves the city of Rose Hill Acres.

The Lumberton Independent School District contains approximately 3708 students as of October 2007. In 2009, the school district was rated "academically acceptable" by the Texas Education Agency.

== Schools ==
- Lumberton High School (Grades 9-12)
- Lumberton Middle (Grades 6-8)
- Lumberton Intermediate (Grades 3-5)
- Lumberton Primary (Grades 1-2)
- Lumberton Early Childhood (Grades PK, K)
