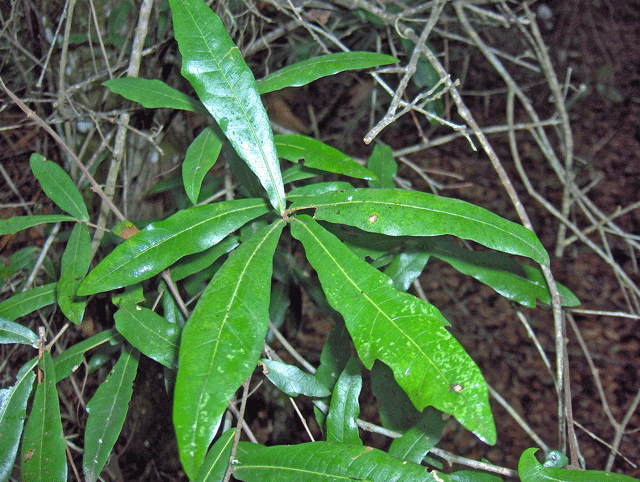

Conservation status
- Least Concern (IUCN 3.1)

Scientific classification
- Kingdom: Plantae
- Clade: Embryophytes
- Clade: Tracheophytes
- Clade: Spermatophytes
- Clade: Angiosperms
- Clade: Eudicots
- Clade: Rosids
- Order: Fagales
- Family: Fagaceae
- Genus: Quercus
- Subgenus: Quercus subg. Quercus
- Section: Quercus sect. Lobatae
- Species: Q. hemisphaerica

Binomial name
- Quercus hemisphaerica Bartram ex Willd.
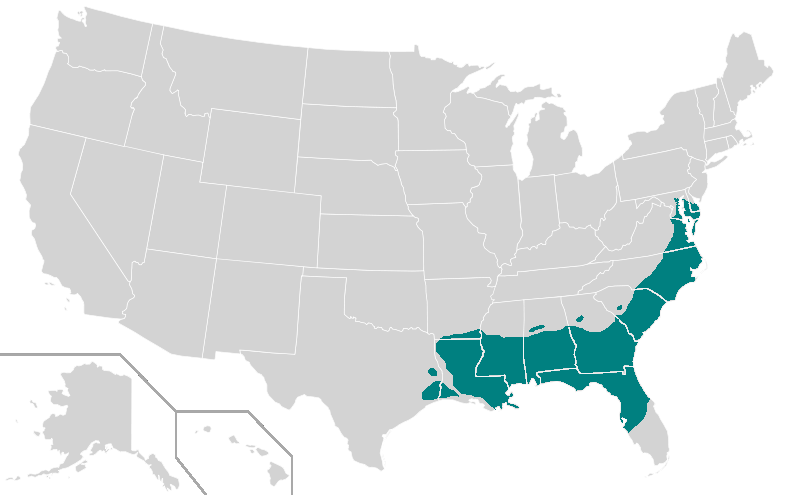

Synonyms
- List: Dryopsila maritima (Michx.) Raf.; Quercus geminata f. maritima (Michx.) Trel.; Quercus hemisphaerica var. maritima (Michx.) C.H.Mull.; Quercus laurifolia var. maritima (Michx.) A.E.Murray; Quercus laurifolia subsp. maritima (Michx.) A.E.Murray; Quercus maritima Raf.; Quercus maritima (Michx.) Willd.; Quercus nigra f. hemisphaerica (Bartram ex Willd.) Trel.; Quercus phellos var. maritima Michx.; Quercus virens var. maritima (Michx.) Chapm.; Quercus virginiana var. maritima (Michx.) Sarg.

= Quercus hemisphaerica =

Species of oak tree

Quercus hemisphaerica (sand laurel oak, laurel oak, Darlington oak, laurel-leaf oak) is a species of oak native to the southeastern and south-central United States. It is in the red oak section of Quercus sect. Lobatae. It is often confused with and closely related to Quercus laurifolia (swamp laurel oak), from which it differs in several key characteristics.

== Description ==
Quercus hemisphaerica is a medium-sized evergreen to semi-evergreen tree which can grow as tall as 35 meters (115 feet) with a trunk diameter of 1.5 m (5 ft), although it is more commonly around 18–20 m (59–66 ft) tall. The leaves are entire, without teeth except one apical awn (rarely with a few teeth near the apex), mostly elliptical or narrowly ovate, and 3–12 centimeters (1 1/8–4 3/4 inches) long by 1–4 cm (3/8–1 5/8 in) wide. The petiole is very short, ranging from 1–5 millimeters (1/16–3/16 in) long, and the leaf base is obtuse to rounded. The acorns are hemispheric in shape and 9 to 16.5 mm (3/8 to 5/8 in) by 9 to 16.5 mm (3/8 to 5/8 in). The acorns take 18 months to mature and are a fourth to a third covered by a saucer- to bowl-shaped cap.

=== Similar species ===
Q. hemisphaerica resembles Quercus laurifolia (swamp laurel oak). They can be distinguished using these criteria.

- When both sand laurel oak and swamp laurel oak are growing in the same area, sand laurel oak will flower about two weeks later than swamp laurel oak.
- Sand laurel oak grows on dry sandy soils, while swamp laurel oak grows on flood plains, river bottoms, and occasionally poorly drained upland soils.
- Sand laurel oak has narrow ovate or elliptic leaves, while swamp laurel oak has rhombic or broad ovate leaves.
- Sand laurel oak has an acute leaf apex and a rounded or obtuse (blunt, >90°) leaf base, while swamp laurel oak has an obtuse or rounded leaf apex and a cuneate or attenuate leaf base.
- Sand laurel oak is mostly evergreen, while swamp laurel oak is mostly tardily deciduous.

== Distribution and habitat ==
The tree can be found from Texas to Delaware.

It grows in somewhat xeric sandy soils, on sand hills, and sometimes on hillsides.

== Ecology ==
There is at least one known hybrid involving Q. hemisphaerica which is with Q. laevis (Q. × mellichampii Trel.).
