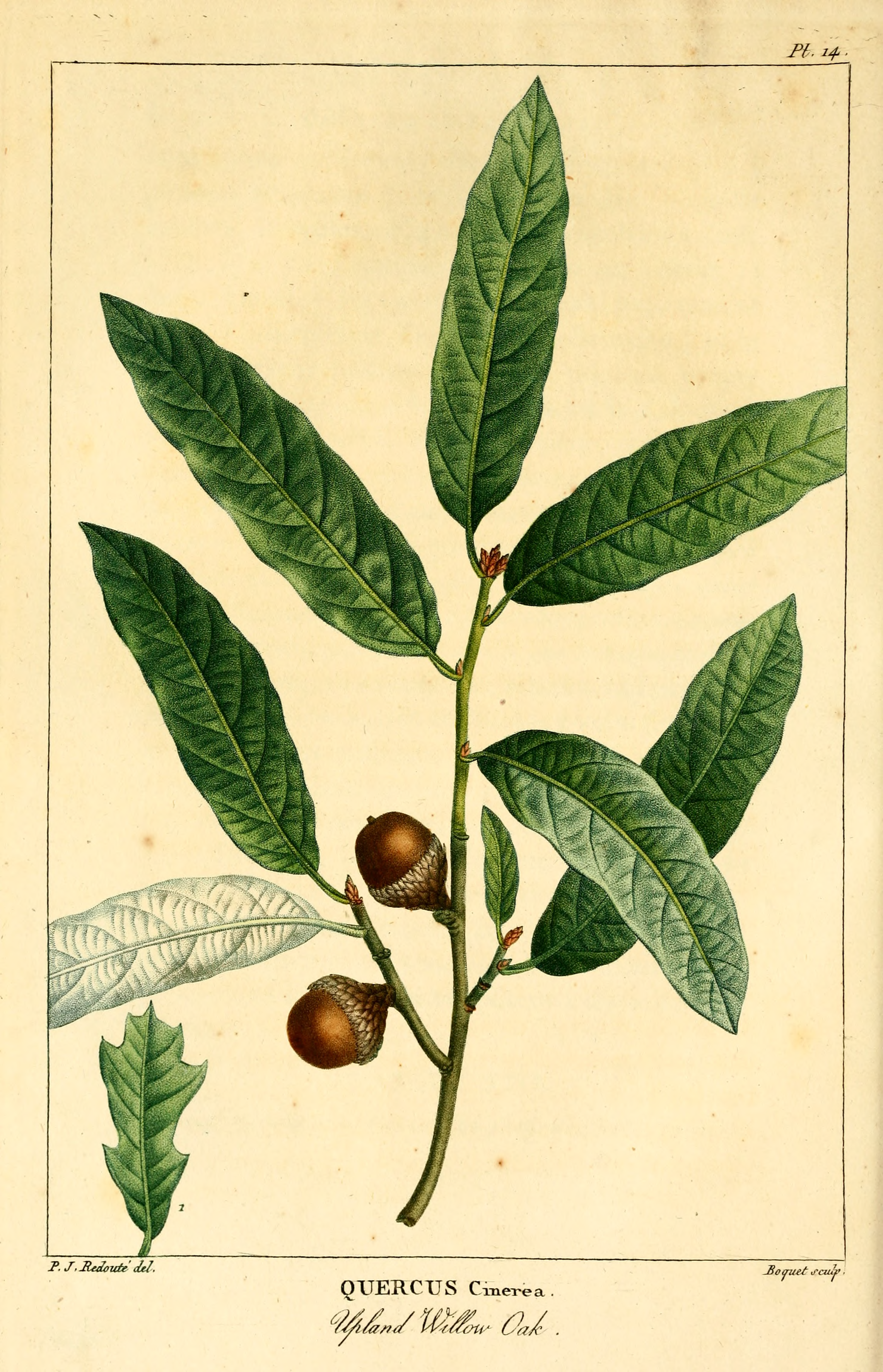

Conservation status
- Least Concern (IUCN 3.1)

Scientific classification
- Kingdom: Plantae
- Clade: Tracheophytes
- Clade: Angiosperms
- Clade: Eudicots
- Clade: Rosids
- Order: Fagales
- Family: Fagaceae
- Genus: Quercus
- Subgenus: Quercus subg. Quercus
- Section: Quercus sect. Lobatae
- Species: Q. incana

Binomial name
- Quercus incana W.Bartram
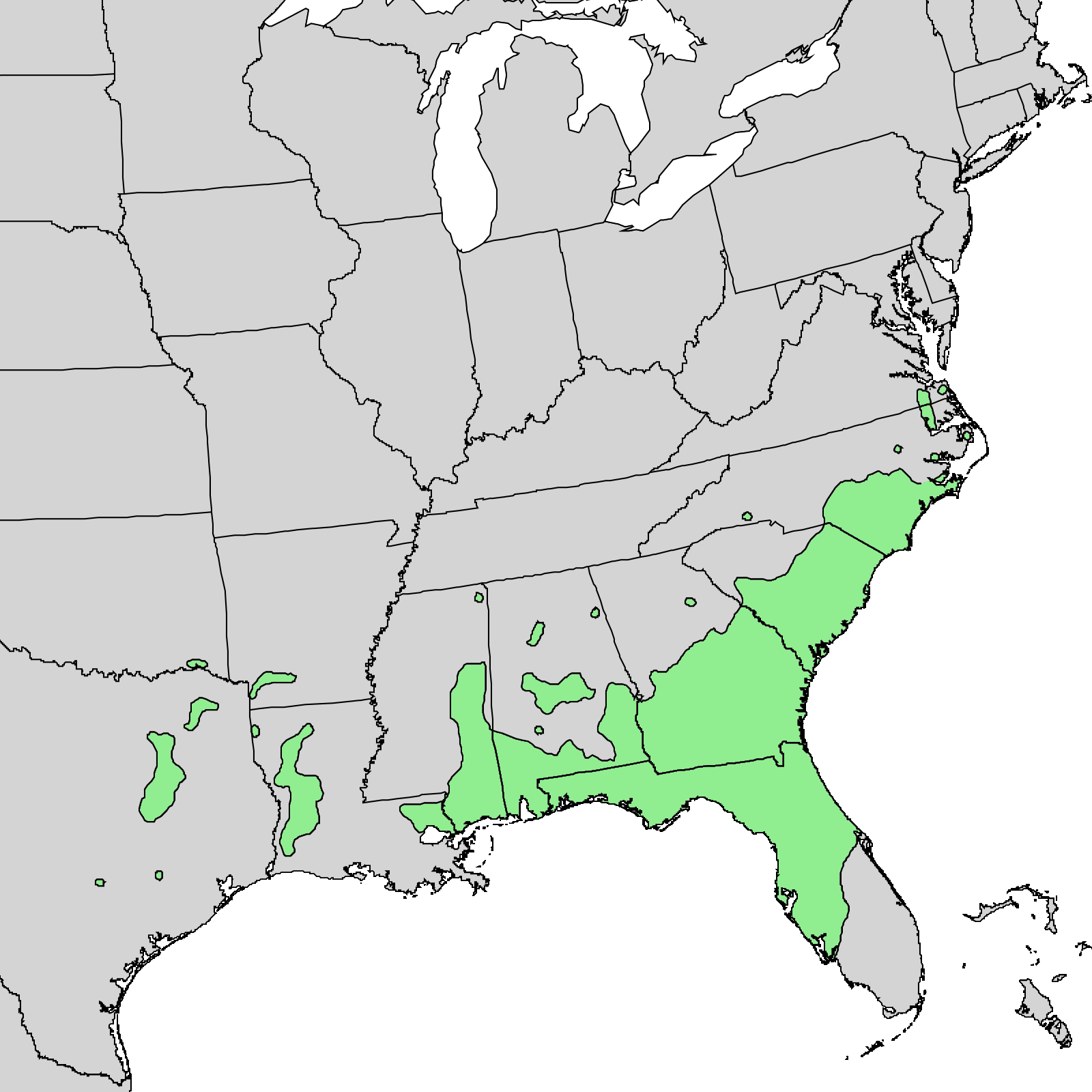
- Natural range

Synonyms
- List: Dryopsila cinerea (Michx.) Raf.; Dryopsila oligodes Raf.; Dryopsila verrucosa Raf.; Quercus brevifolia Sarg. 1895 not Kotschy ex A. DC. 1864; Quercus cinerea Michx.; Quercus cinerea Raf.; Quercus cinerea var. dentatolobata A.DC.; Quercus cinerea f. dentatolobata (A.DC.) Trel.; Quercus cinerea var. humilis (Pursh) A.DC.; Quercus heterophylla Raf. 1838 not F.Michx. 1812; Quercus humilis Walter 1788 not Mill. 1768; Quercus ilexoides Raf.; Quercus oligodes Raf.; Quercus phellos var. brevifolia Lam.; Quercus phellos var. humilis Pursh; Quercus phellos var. latifolia Marshall; Quercus verrucosa Raf.

= Quercus incana =

Species of oak tree

Quercus incana is a species of oak known by the common names bluejack oak, upland willow oak, sandjack oak, and cinnamon oak. It is native to the Atlantic Plain and Gulf Coastal Plain of the United States, from Virginia around Florida to Texas and inland to Oklahoma and Arkansas.

== Description ==
Quercus incana is a tree growing to about 10 meters (33 feet) in height, with a maximum height around 15 m (49 ft). The "national champion bluejack" was a specimen from Texas that was 15.5 m (51 ft) tall and 2.1 m (7 ft) in circumference, and had a crown spread of 17 m (56 ft). The trunk is short and the crooked branches form an open, irregular crown. The platy bark is dark brown or black. The leaves are generally oval and up to 10 centimeters long by 3.5 cm wide. They are glossy green on top and woolly-haired and bluish in color underneath. The name bluejack refers to this bluish and ashy appearance of the leaves. The acorn is up to 1.7 cm long by 1.6 cm wide, not counting the cap. The oak reproduces by seed and by resprouting from the rootcrown when the upper parts are removed. It can form thickets by spreading underground runners.

== Ecology ==
Quercus incana often grows in longleaf pine (Pinus palustris) ecosystems, where it shares the understory with turkey oak (Q. laevis) and wiregrass (Aristida stricta). In the Big Thicket of Texas it codominates with post oak (Q. stellata) and a number of pines. The oak can be found on sandy soils. It grows downslope from ridgetops, where the soils are finer and less dry than the tops of the ridges. It is well adapted to wildfire and grows in habitat where fire is common and often required, such as longleaf pine ecosystems. The oak does not tolerate dense shade and requires fire to remove taller, more robust oaks that would otherwise outcompete it.

The acorns provide food for many animal species including the Sherman's fox squirrel, which lives in longleaf pine communities.

== Uses ==
The wood of Q. incana is hard and strong, but the trees are usually too small to be useful except as fuel or posts.
