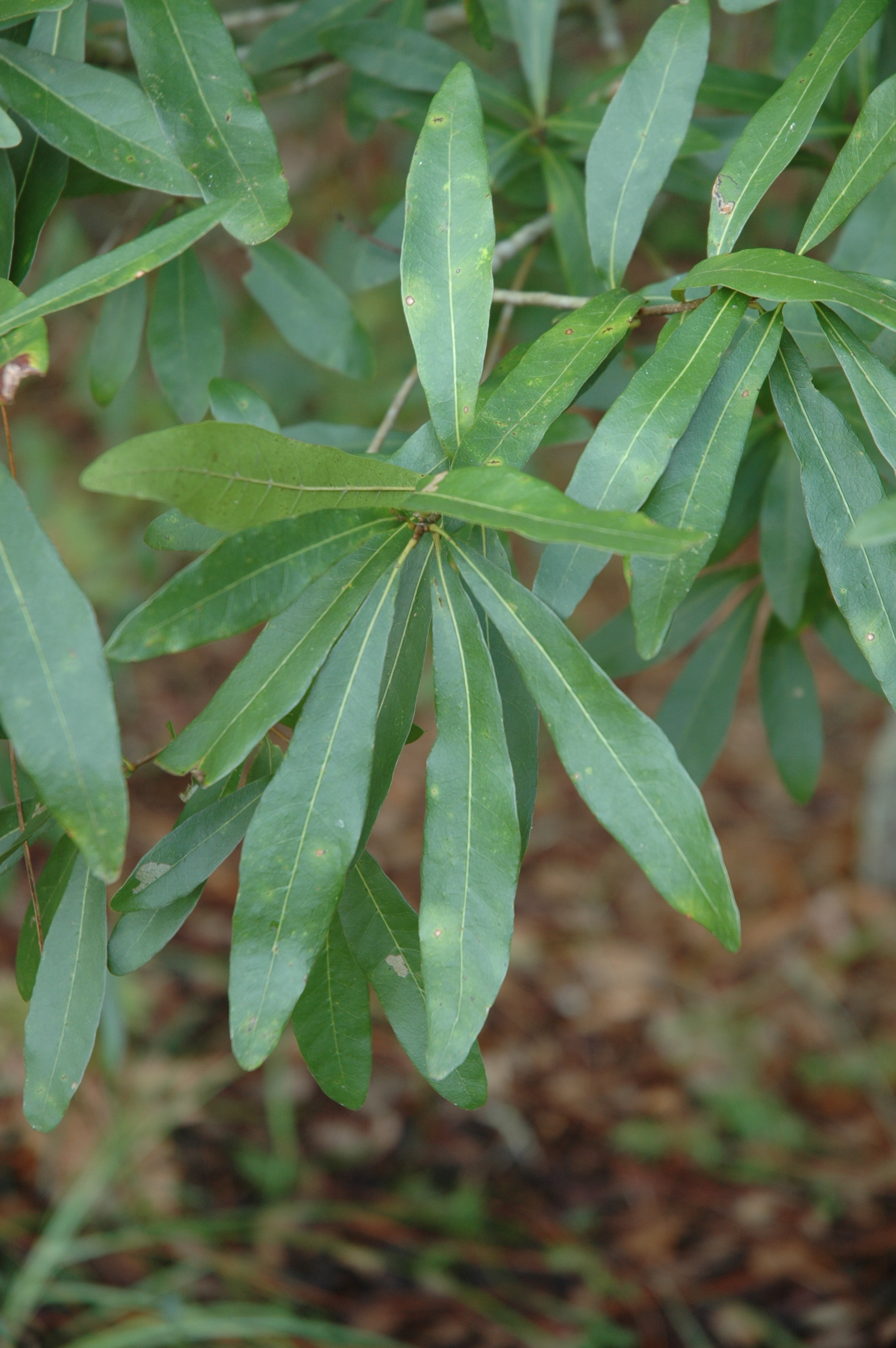

Conservation status
- Least Concern (IUCN 3.1)

Scientific classification
- Kingdom: Plantae
- Clade: Embryophytes
- Clade: Tracheophytes
- Clade: Spermatophytes
- Clade: Angiosperms
- Clade: Eudicots
- Clade: Rosids
- Order: Fagales
- Family: Fagaceae
- Genus: Quercus
- Subgenus: Quercus subg. Quercus
- Section: Quercus sect. Lobatae
- Species: Q. laurifolia

Binomial name
- Quercus laurifolia Michx.
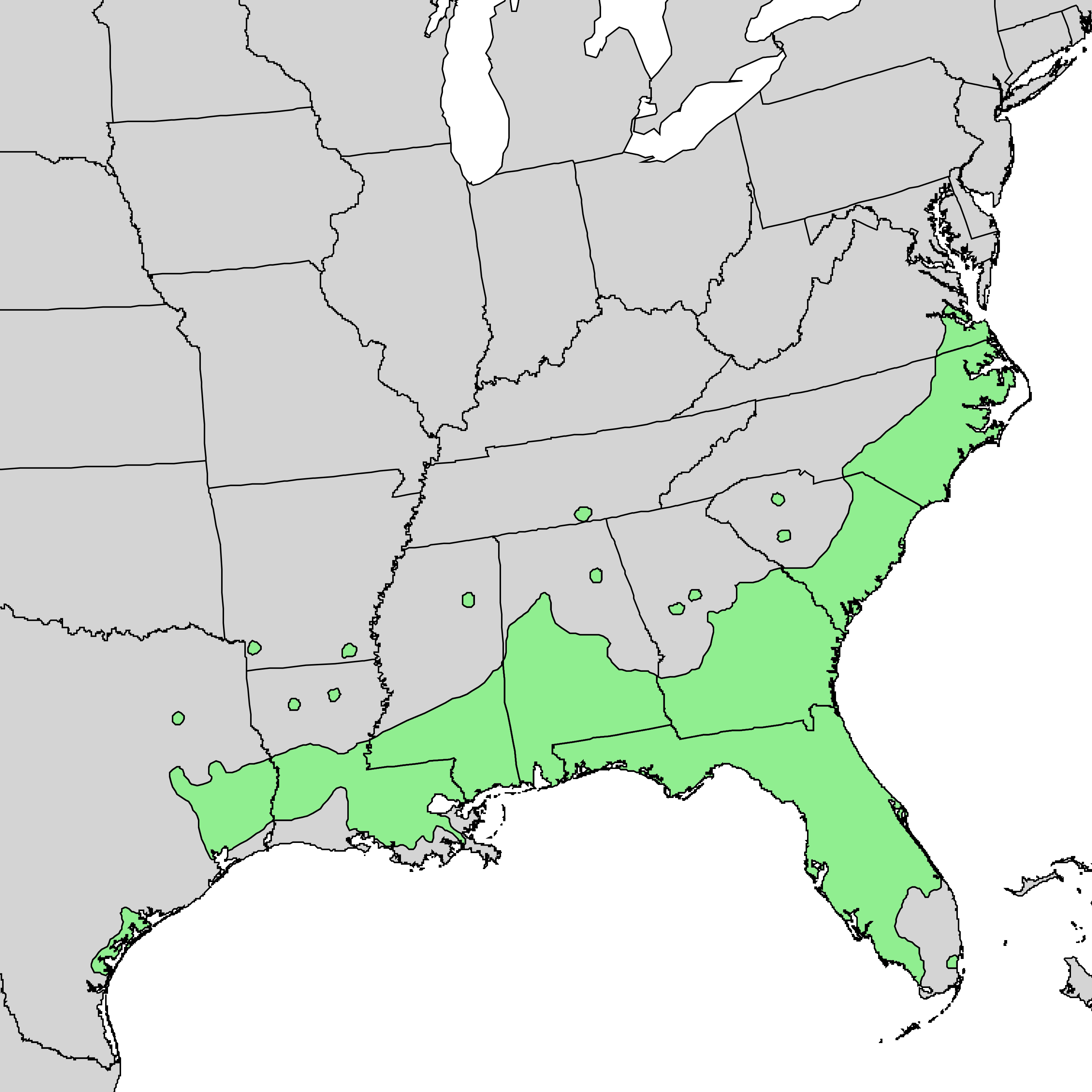
- Natural range of Quercus laurifolia

Synonyms
- List: Quercus aquatica var. laurifolia (Michx.) A. DC.; Quercus phellos var. laurifolia (Michx.) Chapm.; Quercus uliginosa var. laurifolia (Michx.) Zabel; Quercus laurifolia var. acuta Willd.; Quercus laurifolia f. dentata Trel.; Quercus laurifolia var. hybrida Michx.; Quercus laurifolia f. obovatifolia (Sarg.) Trel.; Quercus laurifolia var. obtusa Willd.; Quercus laurifolia var. rhombica (Sarg.) Trel.; Quercus laurifolia var. tridentata Sarg.; Quercus obtusa (Willd.) Ashe; Quercus obtusa Sarg.; Quercus obtusa (Willd.) Pursh; Quercus obtusa var. obovatifolia (Sarg.) Ashe; Quercus rhombica Sarg.; Quercus rhombica var. obovatifolia Sarg.

= Quercus laurifolia =

Swamp laurel oak

Species of oak tree

Quercus laurifolia (swamp laurel oak, diamond-leaf oak, water oak, obtusa oak, laurel oak) is a medium-sized semi-evergreen oak in the red oak section Quercus sect. Lobatae. It is native to the southeastern coastal plains and south-central United States.

== Description ==
Quercus laurifolia is a tree growing to 20–24 meters (65–80 feet) (rarely to 40 m or 130 ft) tall, with a large, circular crown. The leaves are broad lanceolate, 2.5–12.7 centimeters (1–5 inches) long and 1.3–4.4 cm (1/2–1 3/4 in) broad, and unlobed (very rarely three-lobed) with an entire margin and a bristle tip; they typically fall just as the new leaves start to emerge in spring. The acorns, borne in a shallow or deep cup, are hemispherical or oblong, 8.5–16 millimeters (5/16–5/8 in) but up to one inch (2.5 cm) long, green, maturing blackish-brown about 18 months after pollination. Acorn production is often heavy, enhancing the species' value for wildlife.

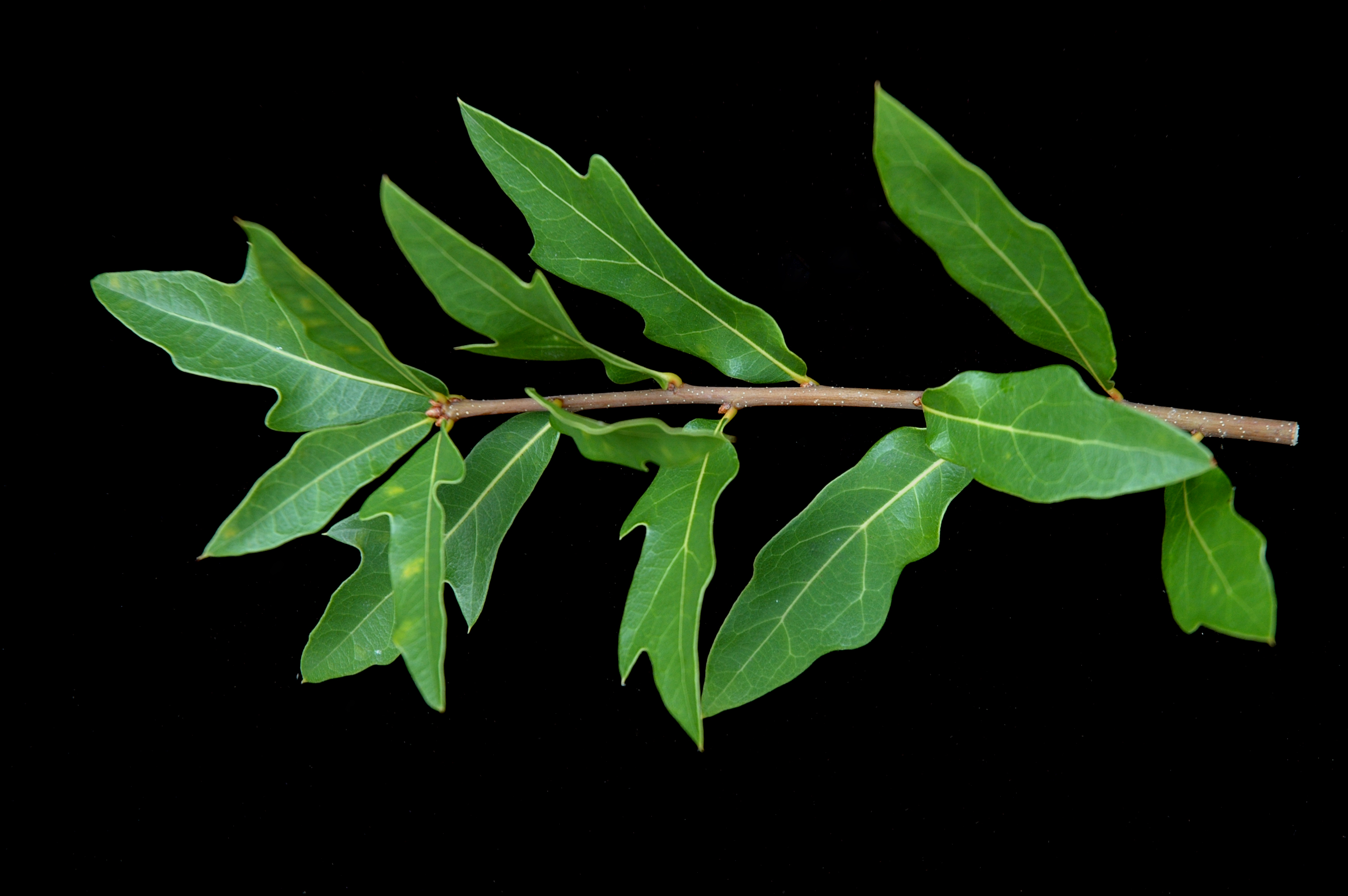
The leaves of swamp laurel oak are occasionally three-lobed, as seen above.

The seedlings show embryo dormancy and germinate the following spring after fall ripening; germination is hypogeal.

Swamp laurel oak grows rapidly and usually matures in about 50 years.

A similar evergreen oak that also grows in sandy soils is Quercus hemisphaerica, the sand laurel oak.

== Taxonomy ==
The botanist C.J. Burke suggested that swamp laurel oak is of hybrid origin having been derived from willow oak (Quercus phellos) and water oak (Quercus nigra); it is not found outside the ranges of the two supposed parental species. This conclusion was based on an index from leaf-shape on seedlings grown from acorns. However, this theory has not achieved wide support, with current authors accepting Quercus laurifolia as a distinct species (e.g. Flora of North America).

== Distribution and habitat ==
Swamp laurel oak grows from coastal Virginia to central Florida and west to southeast Texas. There are reports of the species growing in Pennsylvania and New Jersey, but these probably represent introductions.

The species is found mostly on alluvial flood plains, from sea level up to 150 m (490 ft) altitude. It will tolerate the wetter sites in association with other oak species but will not live with continuous or prolonged flooding. It is most often found growing in sandy soil near rivers and along the edges of swamps if not too frequently flooded. Swamp laurel oak grows in the hammocks of central Florida and on sand hills adjacent to swamps in west Florida. Swamp laurel oak grows best on ultisols and inceptisols.

The range has average annual temperatures from 16 to 21 °C (61 to 70 °F). It can withstand extreme lows ranging from −1 to −28 °C (30 to −18 °F). Extreme highs range from 38 to 43 °C (100 to 109 °F).

It needs between 1,250–1,500 mm (49–59 in) of rainfall a year. From 500–1,000 mm (20–39 in) of this is received during the growing season from April to September.

The laurel oak is probably one of the most cold-hardy evergreen oaks. Trees growing in Cincinnati indicate the laurel oak may be hardy even further north than previously thought tolerating temperatures lower than −29 °C (−20 °F) and surviving into zone 5. In Cincinnati trees have been observed staying green well into December.

== Ecology ==
Known hybrids with Quercus laurifolia as one parent are with Q. falcata (Q × beaumontiana Sarg.), Q. incana (Q. × atlantica Ashe), and Q. marilandica (Q. × diversiloba Tharp ex A. Camus).

The tree is host to the general oak-feeding insects but has no serious insect problems. Several species of Curculio weevils infest the acorns.

Despite their bitter kernel, the acorns are eaten by deer (including white-tailed deer), squirrels, birds (including ducks, bobwhite quail and wild turkeys), raccoons and small rodents.

== Uses ==
It is grown and marketed mainly as pulpwood. It is commonly used as an ornamental tree in landscaping because of its fast growth and pleasing appearance; it is planted with little regard to soil type.
