= Dwarf salamander =

Dwarf salamander may refer to five species of salamander in the genus Eurycea, all endemic to the United States and all of which were previously assigned to a single species (Eurycea quadridigitata):

- Chamberlain's dwarf salamander (Eurycea chamberlaini), found only in the Carolinas
- Hillis's dwarf salamander (Eurycea hillisi), found in interior regions of southern Alabama and Georgia, and the central Florida panhandle
- Western dwarf salamander (Eurycea paludicola), found from Mississippi west to eastern Texas
- Southeastern dwarf salamander (Eurycea quadridigitata), found from southern North Carolina south to Florida, west to Louisiana
- Bog dwarf salamander (Eurycea sphagnicola), found in southern Mississippi, Alabama, and the far western Florida panhandle
