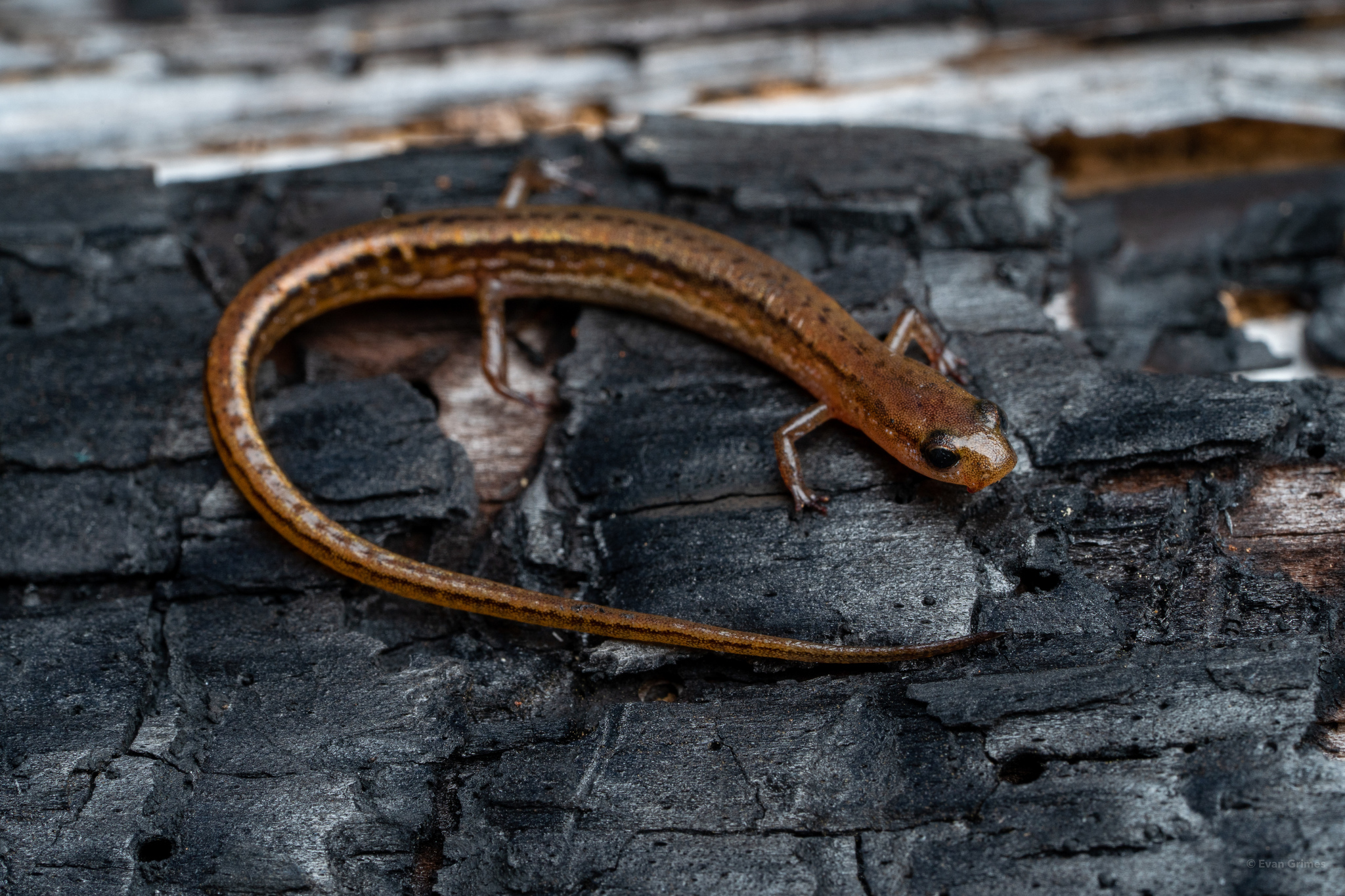

Conservation status
- Least Concern (IUCN 3.1)

- Critically Imperiled (NatureServe)

Scientific classification
- Kingdom: Animalia
- Phylum: Chordata
- Class: Amphibia
- Order: Urodela
- Family: Plethodontidae
- Genus: Eurycea
- Species: E. sphagnicola

Binomial name
- Eurycea sphagnicola Wray, Means, and Steppan, 2017

= Bog dwarf salamander =

Species of salamander

The bog dwarf salamander (Eurycea sphagnicola) is a species of salamander endemic to the southern United States. Designated as genetically different from the southeastern dwarf salamander (E. quadridigitata) in a 2017 study, in which it was found to have important genetic and physical differences. The species itself has been found in very few numbers, so much more research will likely be needed to understand it better. It is found in a very small section of the Gulf Coast, resulting in the possibility that it is the most geographically restricted subspecies of dwarf salamander. Its known breeding habitat is within acidic bogs, specifically on mats of Sphagnum moss.

== Taxonomy ==
It was previously thought to be a population of the southeastern dwarf salamander (E. quadridigitata) but a 2017 study found it to be a distinct species based on genetic evidence, and described it as E. sphagnicola. It is unlikely that any previous studies had analyzed populations of this species.

It is the most divergent of the eastern species in the dwarf salamander complex, having diverged from the clade containing E. quadridigitata, E. hillisi, and E. chamberlaini during the late Oligocene to mid-Miocene, about 23-15 million years ago.

== Phylogeny ==
The Eurycea sphagnicola was originally believed to be a variant of Eurycea quadridigitata before the 2017 study done by Wray, Means, and Stepphan which found several distinguishable morphological and genetic differences. The Eurycea genus also known as “brook salamanders” are part of the Plethodontinae family which are lungless salamanders. The Eurycea sphagnicola along with 4 other Plethodontinae are distinguished into a complex based on them having 4 digits. The species in this complex are the E. chamberlaini, E. quadridigitata, E. paludicola, E. hillisi, E. sphagnicola. The E. sphagnicola differed from these other species in the complex based on differing measurements and colorings. The character found to be most unique of the E. sphagnicola is with its larvae which has a dorsal tail fin. With very few specimens being found, (36), a considerable amount of research is still needed to further understand the differences of the Eurycea sphagnicola from the other salamanders both in the complex and the overall genus.

== Species Description and Adaptations ==
The Eurycea sphagnicola is a diminutive salamander around 6.7 cm long with a cylindrical torso, a head, and a long tail. The proximal end of the tail contains a square base, while the distal end of the tail is rounded. Unlike some salamanders in the Eurycea genus, the bog dwarf salamander only has four toes on the hind feet. The pigmentation for the Eurycea sphagnicola can be highly variable with dorsal pigmentation ranging from orange-brown, copper, or bronze. These salamanders usually have a dark dorsolateral stripe ranging from the torso to the tail with dark specks throughout the dorsal side. The underside of the salamander has white or gray coloration and yellow smudging towards the lower end of the torso to the tail. During the mating season, the male bog dwarf salamanders grow cirri. When the salamander is in preservation, its coloration can shift. The dorsal pigmentation and markings can fade, and the yellow coloration of the ventral side can become faint.

== Distribution ==
It is found only in a small portion of the Gulf Coast of the United States, being found in the western Florida Panhandle and southern Alabama and Mississippi. It is likely the most geographically restricted of all species in the dwarf salamander complex.

== Habitat ==
The bog dwarf salamander (Eurycea sphagnicola) is found at the bottom of the steephead seepage, specifically in a dense mat of long-fibered sphagnum moss. The bog dwarf salamander is a wetland species commonly associated with sphagnum moss and pitcher plants. They are coupled with lower coastal plain pitcher plant bogs. Populations of the bog dwarf salamander are seen in boggy seepage slopes and ravines mostly in western Florida. Its breeding habitats are restricted to mats of sphagnum moss on acidic seepage bogs. They breed in sluggish and flowing water. In the United States, the bog dwarf salamander can be spotted in Alabama, Florida, and Mississippi, mostly in aquatic habitats. In addition, the bog dwarf salamander can be located along the northern gulf coast. Ultimately, the bog dwarf salamander tend to stay in the atypical wetland and various freshwater aquatic habitats.
