= Davy Crockett National Forest =

National forest in east Texas

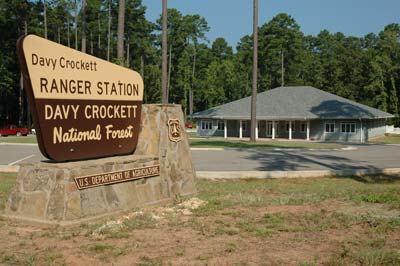

- Location within the United States
- Location: Kennard, Texas and Houston County, Texas, USA
- Nearest city: Lufkin, TX
- Coordinates: 31°20′00″N 95°05′00″W
- Area: 160,647 acres (650.12 km^{2})
- Established: October 13, 1936
- Governing body: U.S. Forest Service
- Website: Davy Crockett National Forest

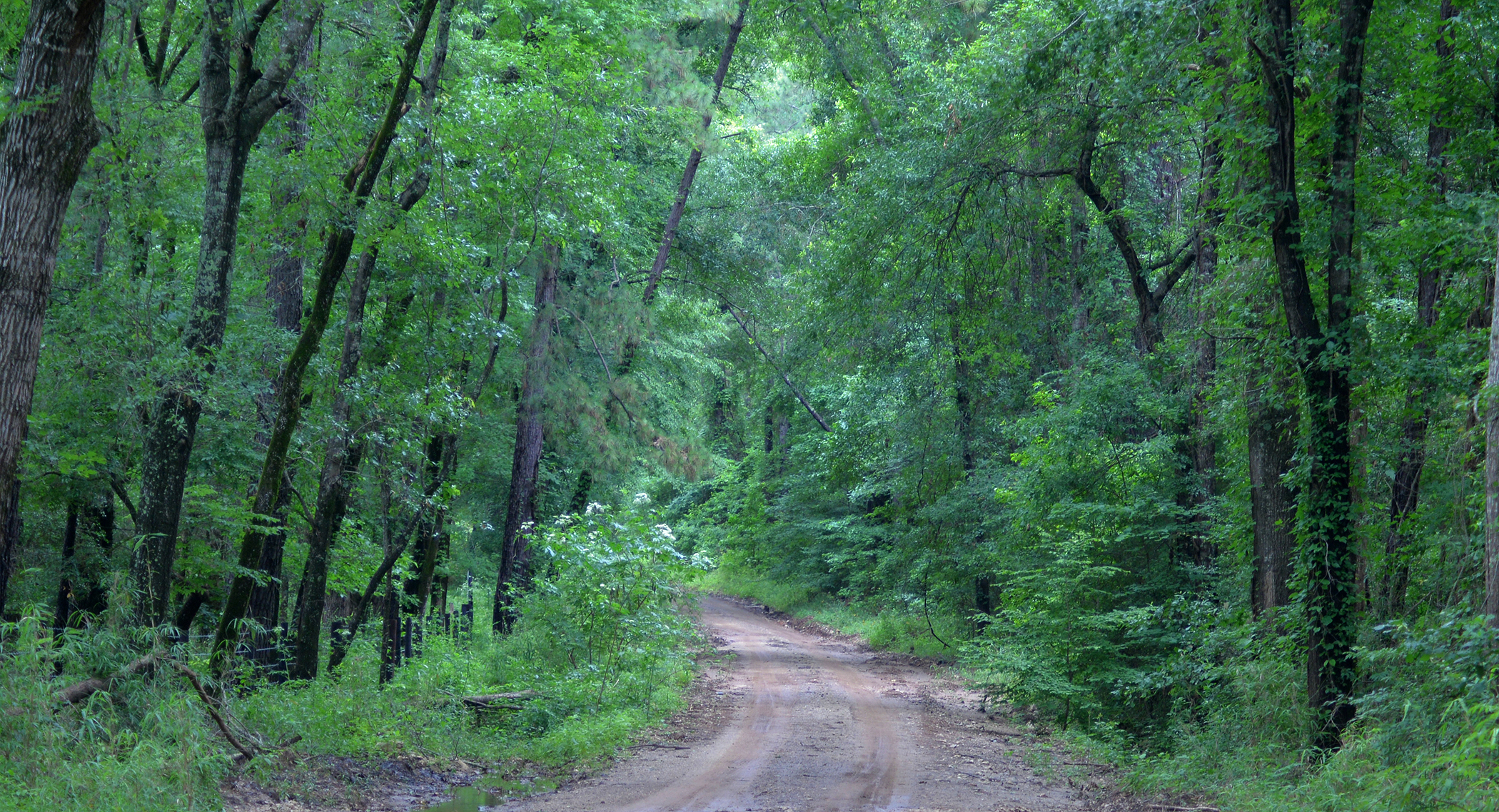
A forest road in Davy Crockett National Forest, Houston County, Texas, USA (May 2019)

Davy Crockett National Forest is in southeast Texas between the towns of Lufkin and Crockett, Texas. It is administered by the United States Department of Agriculture Forest Service local headquarters in Lufkin. There are local ranger district offices located in Ratcliff.

The forest, part of the Piney Woods ecoregion, covers a total of 160,647 acres (251.0 sq mi; 650.1 km^{2}) in two counties - Houston 94,481 acres (147.6 sq mi; 382.4 km^{2}) and Trinity 67,361 acres (105.3 sq mi; 272.6 km^{2}).

Davy Crockett National Forest, which is bordered on the northeast by the Neches River and is located around Kennard, Texas, includes the 45-acre (180,000 m^{2}) Ratcliff Lake. The area is pine-hardwood woodlands with flat to gently rolling terrain.

== Uses ==
The national forest is managed on a multiple-use philosophy and are used for lumbering, grazing, oil production, hunting, and recreation. In fiscal year 1994, 93.8 million board feet of timber was harvested from the national forests in Texas, providing 2,098 jobs and $73,108,000 in income to the surrounding Texas communities. In addition, Texas ranchers with special permits could graze their cattle in the national forests. At the Davy Crockett National Forest, 386 head of cattle grazed in fiscal year 1994.

Recreational facilities within the national forest at the Ratcliff Lake Recreation Area include a bathhouse, camping, picnicking and swimming areas, and boat ramps.

The Four C National Recreation Trail runs through the northern third of the national forest between the Neches Bluff Overlook and Ratcliff Lake Recreation Area in Houston County. The Neches Bluff Overlook provides a panoramic view of the bottomlands at the north end of the forest. From there the trail winds southward about 20 miles passing through the Big Slough Wilderness for a couple of miles along the way. It is named after the Central Coal and Coke Company (once owned by Richard H. Keith), which logged the region from 1901 until all the forest had been clear cut in 1920. Portions of the trail now follow routes, berms, and levees that the Central Coal and Coke Company built for small scale railroads and trams to hall logs. Ratcliff Lake functioned as a log pond and remnants of the sawmill still stand in the Ratcliff Lake Recreation Area.

The Big Slough Wilderness Area was established by Congress in the Texas Wilderness Act of 1984, prohibiting future timber harvest, and allowing natural forces to shape the area. It is located on the northeast margin of the national forest. Most of the 3,639 acre wilderness lies in the floodplain of the Neches River, which defines 11 miles of its eastern border. Large portions of the area are occasionally submerged during periods of heavy rain and flooding. The most recent logging within the Big Slough Wilderness occurred in 1968, mostly pines in peripheral areas, however parts of the area have never been logged. “The Big Slough”, is an old, abandoned channel of the river that winds through the center of the wilderness west of the Neches River, forming an island between the slough and the river. The area supports approximately five square miles of hardwood, bottomland, old growth forest. About two thirds of the wilderness is dominated by hardwood forest, a quarter by shortleaf pine (Pinus echinata) and loblolly pine (Pinus taeda), with the remaining portions being a mix of hardwood and pine or open areas of swamp and water. Just a few of the hardwoods growing in the wilderness include River birch (Betula nigra), bitternut hickory (Carya cordiformis), sugarberry (Celtis laevigata), American sweetgum (Liquidambar styraciflua), American sycamore (Platanus occidentalis), swamp chestnut oak (Quercus michauxii), cherrybark oak (Quercus pagoda), Shumard oak (Quercus shumardii), American black elderberry (Sambucus canadensis), black willow (Salix nigra), American elm (Ulmus americana), Texas cedar elm (Ulmus crassifolia), The national champion planer tree (Planera aquatica) grows in the wilderness.

== Fauna ==
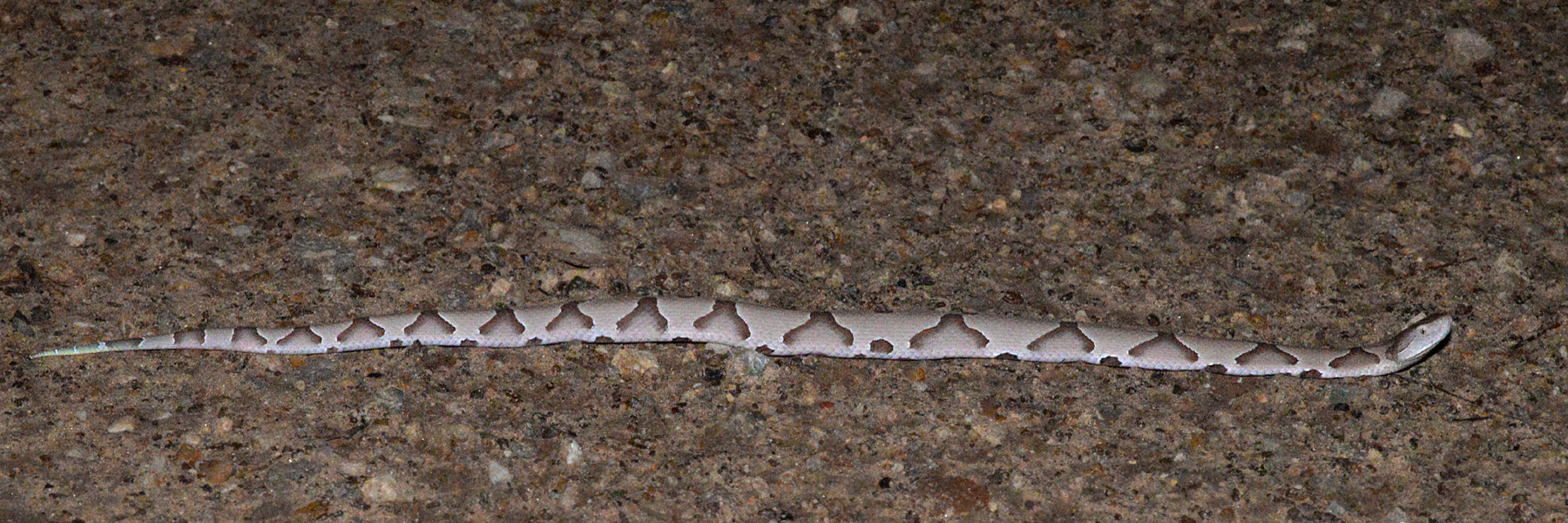
Eastern copperhead (Agkistrodon contortrix) on a forest road at night.

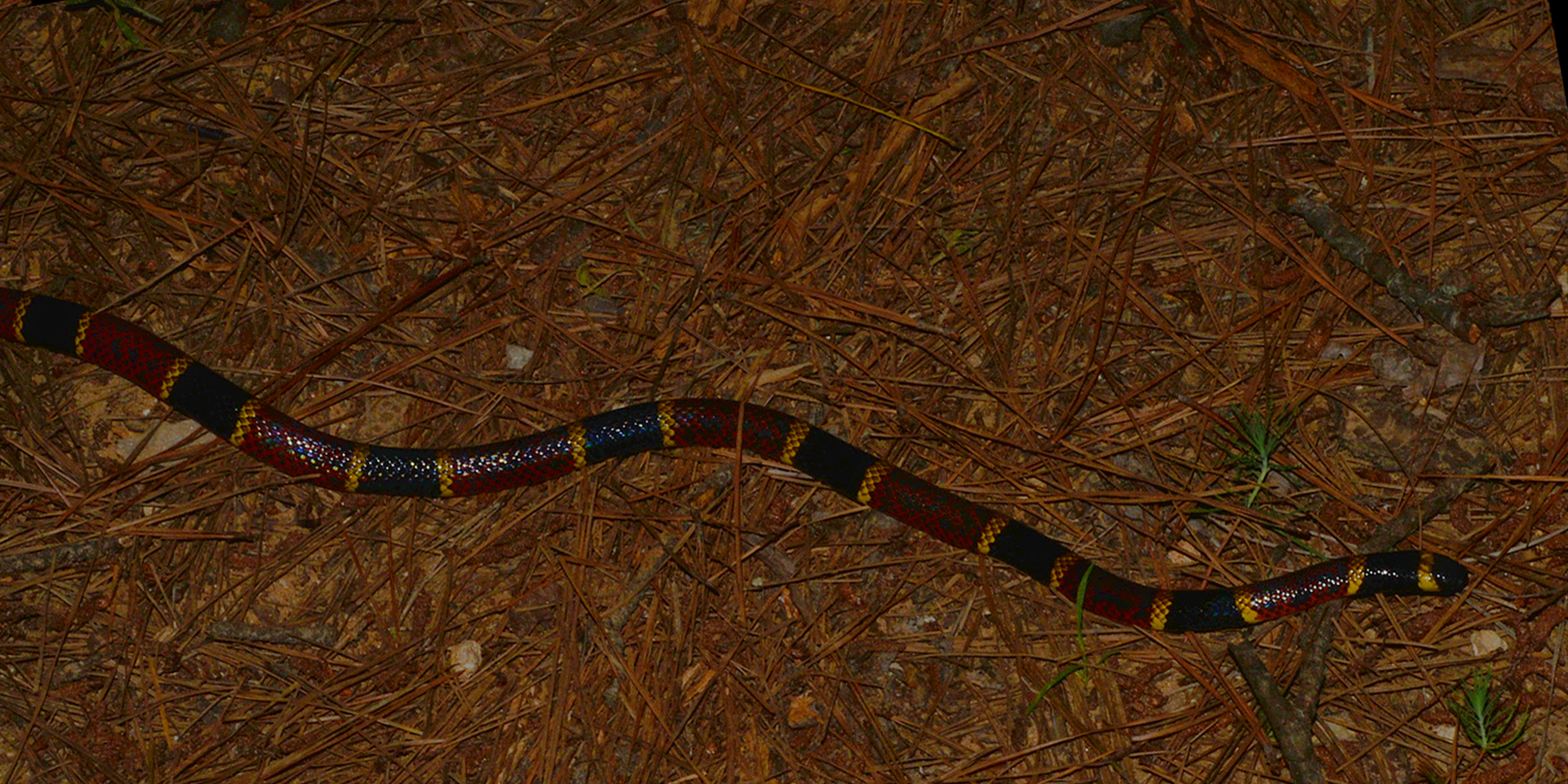
A Texas coralsnake (Micrurus tener) foraging in the pine forest at night.

A few of the reptiles documented in Houston and Trinity counties include lizards such as five-lined skink (Plestiodon fasciatus), ground skink (Scincella lateralis), green anole (Anolis carolinensis), and prairie lizard (Sceloporus consobrinus) and turtles such as eastern snapping turtle (Chelydra serpentina), eastern musk turtle (Sternotherus odoratus), Mississippi mud turtle (Kinosternon subrubrum), Mississippi map turtle (Graptemys pseudogeographica), ornate box turtle (Terrapene ornata), and spiny softshell turtle (Apalone spinifera). Although not particularly abundant in the forest, American alligator (Alligator mississippiensis) may be present in any lake, river, bayou or large body of permanent water in east Texas.

Five species of venomous snakes occur throughout the forest of southeast Texas: Texas coralsnake (Micrurus tener), eastern copperhead (Agkistrodon contortrix), northern cottonmouth (Agkistrodon piscivorus), and less commonly timber rattlesnake (Crotalus horridus), and western pygmy rattlesnake (Sistrurus miliarius). Some of the harmless species include ring-necked snake (Diadophis punctatus), speckled kingsnake (Lampropeltis holbrooki), eastern coachwhip (Masticophis flagellum), plain-bellied watersnake (Nerodia erythrogaster), western ratsnake (Pantherophis obsoletus), rough greensnake (Opheodrys aestivus), and Dekay’s brownsnake (Storeria dekayi).

Amphibian species known from the counties include bronze frog (Lithobates clamitans), gray treefrog (Hyla versicolor), eastern narrow-mouthed toad (Gastrophryne carolinensis), and Hurter’s spadefoot toad (Scaphiopus hurterii), mole salamander (Ambystoma talpoideum), central newt (Notophthalmus viridescens), and western dwarf salamander (Eurycea paludicola).

The fish of Davey Crockett National Forest are largely associated with the Neches River drainage, although a few small creeks on the western edge of the forest drain into the Trinity River. A few of the species documented in the Neches River drainage include chestnut lamprey (Ichthyomyzon castaneus), alligator gar (Atractosteus spatula), longnose gar (Lepisosteus osseus), flathead catfish (Pylodictis olivaris), redfin pickerel (Esox americanus), tadpole madtom (Noturus gyrinus), spotted bass (Micropterus punctulatus), white bass (Morone chrysops), Flier (Centrarchus macropterus), orangespotted sunfish (Lepomis humilis), and longear sunfish (Lepomis megalotis). A few of the smaller species include red shiner (Cyprinella lutrensis), Mississippi silvery minnow (Hybognathus nuchalis), emerald shiner (Notropis atherinoides), western starhead topminnow (Fundulus blairae), blackstripe topminnow (Fundulus notatus), scaly sand darter (Ammocrypta vivax), and mud darter (Etheostoma asprigene).

== See also ==
- Texas Forest Trail
- National forests of Texas
- List of national forests of the United States
