= Gumbo darter =

Conservation status
- Vulnerable (NatureServe)

Scientific classification
- Kingdom: Animalia
- Phylum: Chordata
- Class: Actinopterygii
- Order: Perciformes
- Family: Percidae
- Genus: Etheostoma
- Species: E. thompsoni

Binomial name
- Etheostoma thompsoni (Suttkus, Bart, & Etnier, 2012)

Species of fish

The gumbo darter (Etheostoma thompsoni) is a species of freshwater ray-finned fish, a darter from the subfamily Etheostomatinae, part of the family Percidae, which also contains the perches, ruffes and pikeperches.

== Location ==
It is found in the Neches, Sabine, and Calcasieu River drainages in southeastern Texas and southwestern Louisiana. They inhabit riverbanks, where there are exposed roots with accumulated vegetational debris, and sand to mixed sand and gravel substrate with very little silt.

== Length ==
This species can reach a length of 5.4 cm (2.1 in).

== Description ==
The gumbo darter was first formally described in 2012 by Royal Dallas Suttkus, Henry L. Bart Jr and David A. Etnier with the type locality given as the Neches River, just below the Town Bluff dam at Town Bluff, Tyler County, Texas.

== Etymology ==
The specific name honors the biologist Dr Bruce Allen Thompson (1946–2007).
