= Steinhagen Reservoir =

Reservoir in Texas, United States

Coordinates: 30°48′02″N 94°10′18″W

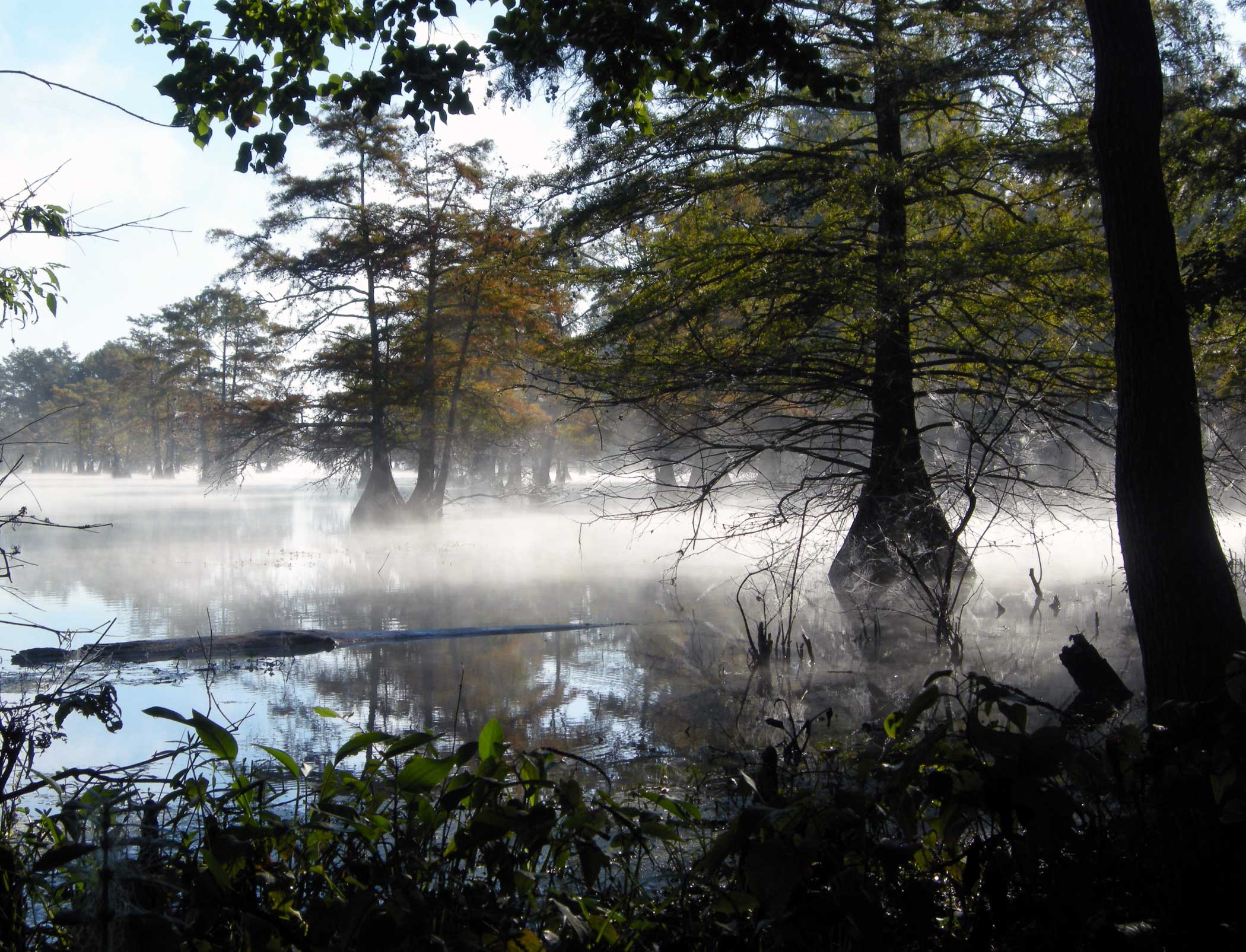
Morning mist on Steinhagen Reservoir, Martin Dies Jr. State Park, Texas

B A Steinhagen Reservoir is located near the town of Jasper, Texas in the east Texas Piney Woods at 30.85 North Latitude and 94.19 West Longitude. The borders of Tyler County and Jasper County are defined by the bed of the Neches River, and therefore bisect the lake on a north–south line. The lake was created as part of a project that focused on creating lakes for recreation, power generation, and water conservation on the Neches River and the Angelina River. For many years, locals have referred to both the lake and dam as "Dam B".

The lake is bisected by U.S. Highway 190 very near its center-most point. Martin Dies, Jr. State Park is located on this lake.

== From the U.S. Army Corps of Engineers ==
Town Bluff Dam and B.A. Steinhagen Lake, originally identified as "Dam B", was authorized by the River and Harbor Act of 1945 (Public Law 14, 79th Congress, 1st Session). Construction was started in March, 1947; deliberate impoundment began April, 1951; with completion of the dam in June, 1953. Cost was $8,000,000 with $2,000,000 contributed by the Lower Neches Valley Authority. The Robert D. Willis Hydropower Project construction started in March, 1987 and the hydropower facilities became available for commercial operation on 17 November 1989. The hydropower project is a first-of-its-kind partnership between private enterprise and the U. S. Government in that the Sam Rayburn Municipal Power Agency (SRMPA) paid for the entire project in advance, rather than reimbursing the Federal Government over the life of the project. The generating capacity is 8 MW.

The project is one of four reservoirs authorized in the Angelina-Neches Rivers basin. Sam Rayburn Reservoir, formerly known as McGee Bend Reservoir, was completed in 1965. The other two projects, "Dam A" and "Rockland" are classified as deferred. In July, 1967, "Dam B" was renamed Town Bluff Dam and B. A. Steinhagen Lake. Town Bluff Dam is derived from being in the close proximity to the community in Tyler County of that name. B. A. Steinhagen was a prominent citizen of Beaumont, Texas who was active in initial planning, authorization, and other water conservation activities. The Robert D. Willis Hydropower Project is named in memory of Willis who served as executive director of SRMPA from May 1980 to May 1988.

The purposes of B. A. Steinhagen Lake are to reregulate the intermittent power releases of Sam Rayburn Dam, provide head for hydroelectric power and diversion into a water supply canal, and provide some water storage. The Southwestern Power Administration, U. S. Department of Energy, markets the power and energy generated by the hydropower plant to the Sam Rayburn Municipal Power Agency for distribution to its customers in Jasper, Liberty, and Livingston, Texas and Vinton, Louisiana. Water releases are used by the Lower Neches Valley Authority in Beaumont, Texas, for rice culture, salinity control, pollution abatement, municipal, and industrial uses.

The Lower Neches Valley Authority (LNVA), an agency of the State of Texas, contributed $2,000,000 toward the construction of the Town Bluff Project. In return, LNVA is authorized to draw from the lake a maximum of 2,000 cubic feet per second (cfs). This water allotment is available to the agency whenever needed, and in the instances of demand, the water is taken directly through the Town Bluff Dam tainter gates. However, if the lake's normal pool capacity is not adequate to satisfy the requirements over an extended period of time, Sam Rayburn Dam can release conservation water into B. A. Steinhagen Lake, which will in turn release the water to meet downstream demands.

In 2006 - 2007, in a cooperative effort with the Texas Parks & Wildlife Department, the Lower Neches Valley Authority, and the Southwestern Power Administration, a summer drawdown was implemented in an attempt to control the noxious aquatic vegetation that was impacting most of the lake. As the lake waters receded in June 2006, the vegetation was exposed to summer temperatures and drying winds. The Texas Department of Transportation contacted the Town Bluff Office and requested that the drawdown continue through October, giving them the opportunity to make repairs to pilings on the US Hwy 190 bridge where it crossed the lake. Also during the drawdown, surface cracks and minor voids were detected in the Town Bluff embankment and spillway, as well as a retaining wall at the floodgates that had cracked and shifted, and the opportunity was taken to address these issues. This work, plus contract and weather delays, extended the drawdown into the late spring of 2007. By now, aquatic vegetation had been exposed to summer heat and winter frost, and it is expected that vegetation growth in the lake will be greatly reduced for several years. There are also plans to apply herbicide via airboat throughout the 2008 growing season, thanks to funding from LNVA.
