= Lower Neches Valley Authority =

- Abbreviation: LNVA
- Formation: 1933
- Purpose: Water management and conservation
- Headquarters: TX
- Region served: Southeast Texas counties Total: Jefferson, Hardin, Tyler; Partial:Jasper, Liberty, Chambers
- Main organ: Board of Directors
- Website: www.lnva.dst.tx.us
- Remarks

The Lower Neches Valley Authority was established in 1933 by the state legislature as a district to store, control, conserve, and utilize the water of the lower Neches River valley in Texas. The LNVA, the second river district created by the state of Texas, is currently one of 23 river districts in the state. It includes all of Jefferson, Hardin, and Tyler counties and parts of Jasper, Liberty, and Chambers counties.

== Governance ==
The LNVA is governed by a board of nine directors appointed by the Texas Water Development Board. Until 1943 the authority was without any facilities to produce revenue. Since 1943 the irrigation system has been renovated many times. It supplies water to the cities (except Beaumont), industry, and rice growers of Jefferson County and portions of Chambers and Liberty counties.

The LNVA has also cooperated with the United States Army Corps of Engineers in planning, financing, and constructing several large multipurpose dams on the Neches River and Angelina River. Other projects sponsored by the authority include the construction of a permanent saltwater barrier on the Neches River, a comprehensive water-quality management program, and the construction of boat ramps and other recreational facilities on area waterways.

== The system ==
=== Canals ===
The LNVA system includes 400 miles (640 km) of canals covering a 700 sq mi (1,800 km^{2}). The canals deliver fresh water to "...eight cities and water districts, 26 industries, and over 100 irrigated farms..." Water is drawn from the lower Neches River and Pine Island Bayou in north Beaumont, with 21 large pumps delivering between 20,000 and 110,000 gallons of water a minute; it has a capability of delivering more than one billion gallons of water a day. Up to 1×10^{9} US gal/d (3.8×10^{9} L/d) maximum

=== Salt water barrier ===
Prior to construction of the permanent barrier, the LNVA installed temporary barriers across Pine Island Bayou and the Neches River upstream of their confluence 36 times between 1940 and 2000, to prevent contamination of their waters from salt water.

A permanent saltwater barrier across the Neches River is located downstream about one-half mile from the confluence of Pine Island Bayou and the Neches River. It is about eight miles north of Beaumont. The barrier, constructed between 2000 and 2003, prevents saltwater contamination during periods of low river flows. The permanent saltwater barrier project had a budgeted cost of $50 million, with the federal government paying 75% of the cost and the LNVA responsible for the remaining 25%. The barrier, over 1,000 feet long, includes a 650-foot-long overflow barrier; five forty-five foot wide tainter gates; and a fifty-six foot wide navigation lane regulated by two thirty-foot sector gates. It also allows the conservation of 200,000 acre-feet per year of freshwater upstream in Sam Rayburn Reservoir.

The salt water barrier project also provides recreational opportunities. Public launching ramps are located on the Jefferson County side of the barrier. The area has a walking trail and playground. The state of Texas created its sixty-first (61st) canoe paddling trail in 2014, with the trail head at the salt water barrier. It progresses north into waters included in the Big Thicket National Preserve.

== External references ==
- "Lower Neches Valley Authority", Texas History Online
- Current Conditions: "LNVA Saltwater Barrier", USGS
