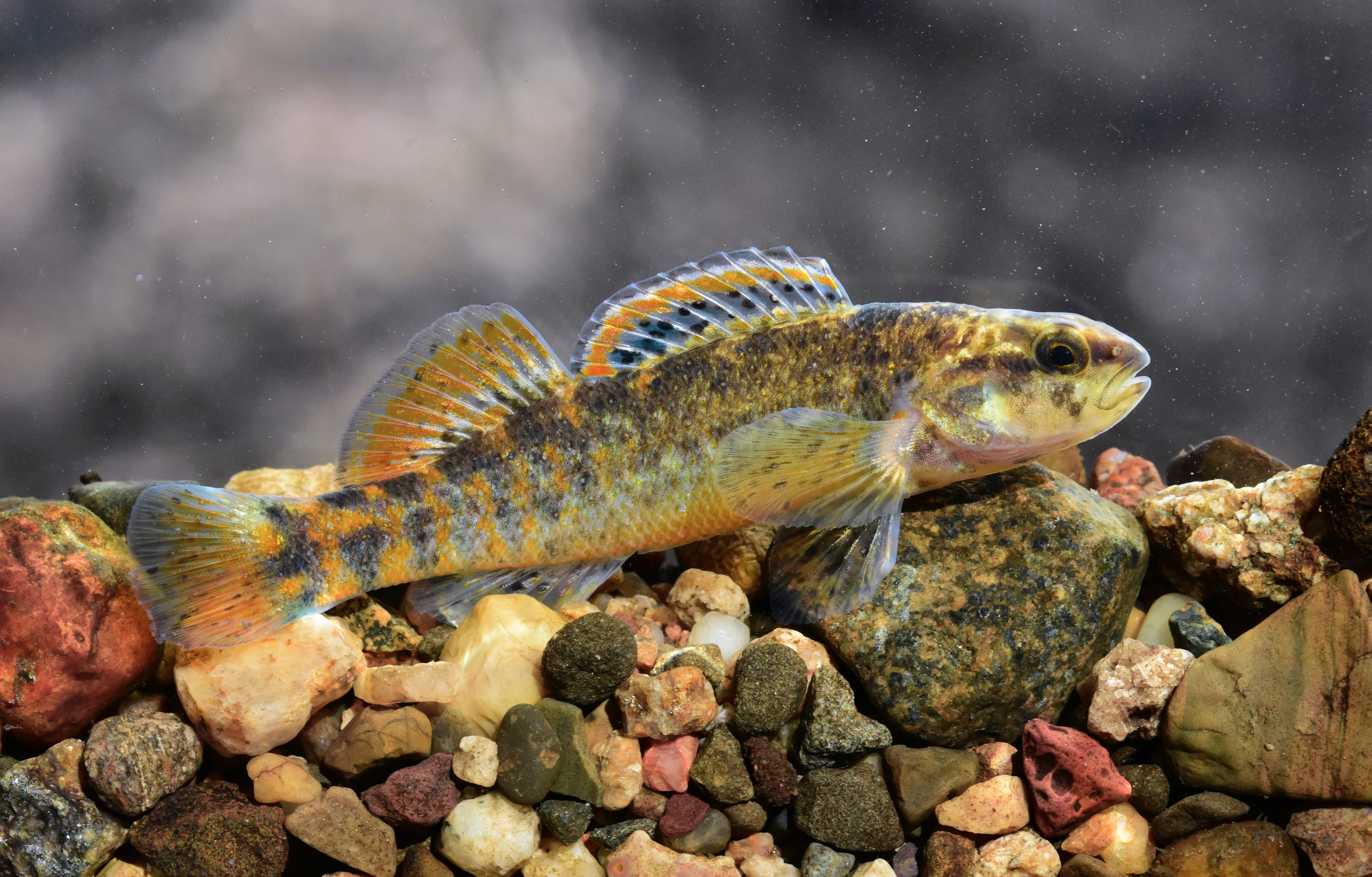

Conservation status
- Least Concern (IUCN 3.1)

Scientific classification
- Kingdom: Animalia
- Phylum: Chordata
- Class: Actinopterygii
- Order: Perciformes
- Family: Percidae
- Genus: Etheostoma
- Species: E. asprigene

Binomial name
- Etheostoma asprigene (S. A. Forbes, 1878)

Synonyms
- Poecilichthys asprigenis S. A. Forbes, 1878

= Mud darter =

Species of fish

The mud darter (Etheostoma asprigene) is a species of freshwater ray-finned fish, a darter from the subfamily Etheostomatinae, part of the family Percidae, which also contains the perches, ruffes and pikeperches. It is endemic to the lowlands of the Mississippi River basin from Wisconsin and Minnesota south to Louisiana and East Texas. It is also found in the drainages of the Sabine and Neches Rivers of Texas and Louisiana. It can be found in slow-moving waters on riffles in rivers, as well as in creeks, swamps, lakes, and reservoirs. It mostly consumes the larvae of midges and blackflies. This species can reach a length of 7.1 cm (2.8 in), though most only reach a length of 5 cm (2.0 in).

== Taxonomy ==
Stephen Alfred Forbes described the mud darter in 1878. The genus name Etheostoma comes from the Greek words etheo, meaning "strain" and stoma, meaning "mouth". The species name asprigene means "rough cheek", referring to the fully scaled cheek and opercle.

== Description ==
The mud darter has a terminal mouth with small teeth on its jaws. The back is olive or brown with 8–11 dark blotches, or saddles, across the back. The side has 9–12 dark brown irregular vertical bars and the base of the tail has three spots arranged vertically. The belly is typically a cream or light olive color. They can reach a length of 7.1 cm (2.8 in), though most only reach a length of 5 cm (2.0 in).

The caudal fin is typically rounded or square in the mud darter. Its dorsal fin has two lobes, the first with 10–12 spines and the second with 10–14 rays. The mud darter does not have an adipose fin. The anal fin typically has 2 spines and 8–9 rays.

== Distribution and habitat ==
The mud darter is distributed throughout the Mississippi River Basin lowlands in North America. It is found from Wisconsin and Minnesota to Louisiana and eastern Texas. It also found on the Gulf Slope in the Sabine River and Neches River drainages in Louisiana and Texas.

The mud darter is found in river mouths and overflow areas of large rivers. In these areas, it is typically found over mud covered with sand or other fine detritus. They can also be found over muddy bottoms in oxbow lakes or in slow riffles of streams. Large numbers of mud darters have been seen in the finely divided tree roots along the shores of large rivers. The juvenile fish are more often found in quieter areas than slow riffles.

== Diet ==
The mud darter mainly feeds on invertebrates. The typical diet consists of midge and blackfly larvae, but some small fish were seen to have micro-crustaceans in their diet as well.

== Life cycle ==
Mud darters do not live over three years of age. After hatching, the fish rapidly grow to half of the total length for year 1 in ten weeks. By the end of year one, most fish averaged between 3.3 and 4.4 cm (1.3 and 1.7 in) and by the end of years two and three, most fish averaged between 4.3 and 5.5 cm (1.7 and 2.2 in). Survivorship from years 1–2 was 75% for males and 81% for females, but this drastically declines, with survivorship from years 2–3 dropping to 14.5% for males and 12.1% for females.

== Reproduction ==
Spawning season for mud darters lasts from early March to early or mid May, with females reaching sexual maturity at one year. During spawning season, males do not establish territories, but are more aggressive toward other males. During courtship, the male swims around a female with his dorsal fin erect, sometimes resting his head on her nape. The spawning site is selected by the female, while the male follows behind. The female enters the vegetation vertically and the male then positions himself over the female, curving his body into an S-shape. The pair will vibrate for a couple of seconds. The females will release between 5 and 10 eggs, which fall onto the substrate or plant. The pair will repeat this process multiple times, resting for anywhere from a few minutes to one half-hour.
