= Neches River National Wildlife Refuge =

National Wildlife Refuge near Jacksonville, Texas

- IUCN category IV (habitat/species management area)
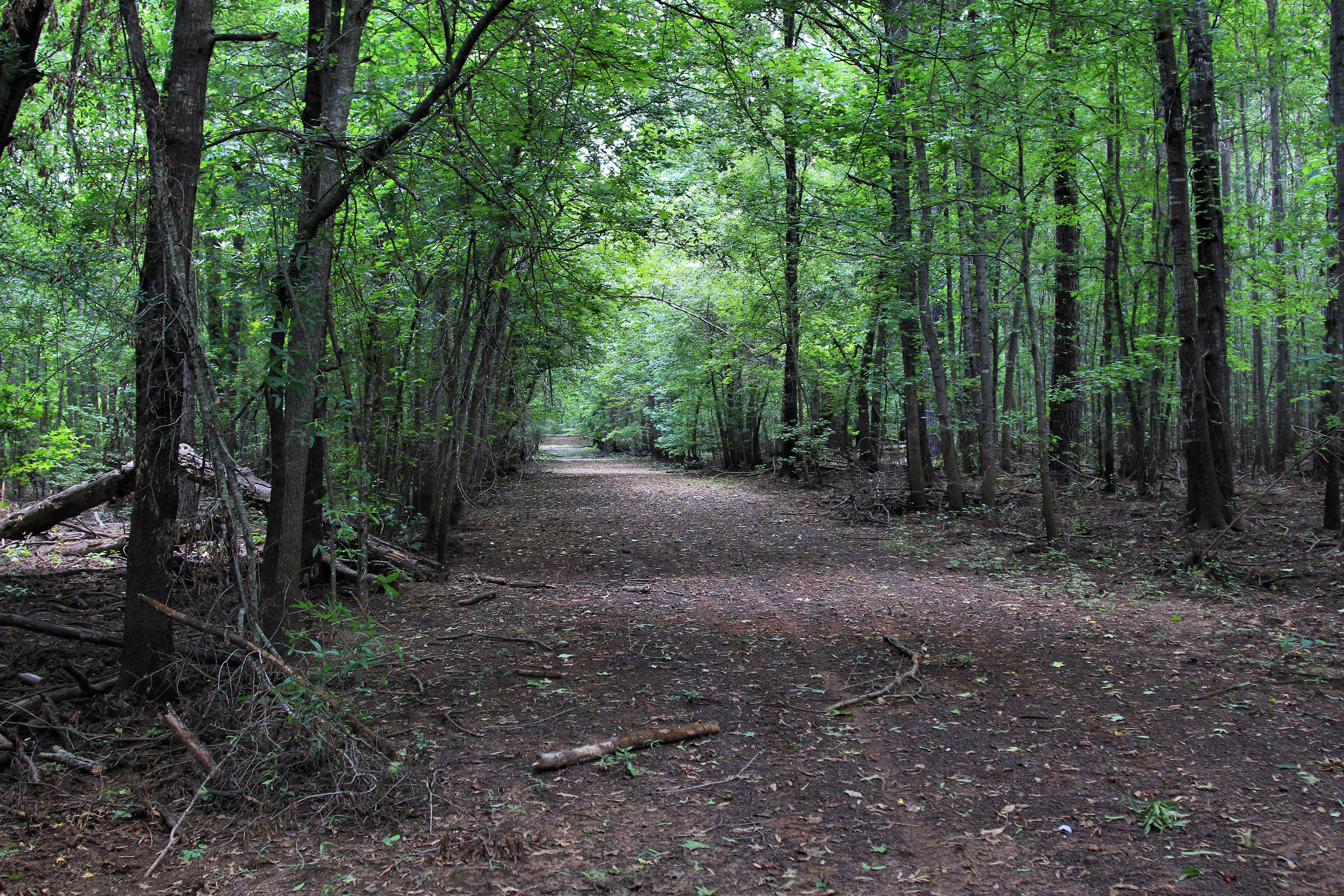
- Songbird Trail

- Location within Texas Location within the United States
- Location: Cherokee County and Anderson County, Texas, United States
- Nearest city: Jacksonville, Texas
- Coordinates: 31°53′34″N 95°25′44″W
- Area: 7,000 acres (28 km^{2})
- Established: 2006
- Governing body: U.S. Fish & Wildlife Service
- Website: Neches River National Wildlife Refuge

The Neches River National Wildlife Refuge is a 7,000-acre (28 km^{2}) protected area of Texas managed by the United States Fish and Wildlife Service as part of the National Wildlife Refuge System. It is located in the rolling hills of East Texas near Jacksonville.

Encompassing the upper Neches River, the unit preserves a pristine waterway. After the city of Dallas proposed constructing a dam along the body of water, conservationists petitioned the federal government to protect the river, which resulted in the 2006 creation of the refuge. The Texas Water Board sued to prevent this acquisition, but in 2010, a federal judge ruled in favor of the Fish & Wildlife Service. The refuge formally opened to the public on October 27, 2018.

More than 100 visitors came to the Refuge in October 2012 to acquaint themselves with the grounds, canoe on the Neches River, and later enjoyed a barbecue dinner at a nearby ranch. Among the hosts were the Friends of the Neches River and the U.S. Fish & Wildlife Service. The Refuge at that point had not received enough funding to establish any on-site programs or amenities to where it could open to regular visitors. A Friends of the Neches River representative explained that the U.S. Fish & Wildlife Service received more than 15,000 letters and signatures requesting the agency to consider a refuge for the area. By 2012, over 3,000 acres (12 km^{2}) had been set aside to make up the Refuge, with thousands more anticipated in the near term. Ultimately, upwards of 25,000 acres (100 km^{2}) could end up being part of the Refuge.

A preview event was held at the Refuge in September 2018, which was open to the public. A Texas Parks and Wildlife representative was present to acquaint visitors with the various wildlife found there. Also attending were University of Texas at Tyler students and teachers, helping to show younger visitors what could be found at the Refuge. Experienced guides led nature walks for attendees, as well. The Texas Conservation Alliance played host of the preview.

== Refuge features ==
Bodies of water (besides the Neches River itself):

- Deadwater Lake
- Buzzard Slough
- Twin Lakes

Trails on the property:

- Deadwater Trail (4.5 miles (7.2 km))
- Hidden Grove Trail (1.5 miles (2.4 km))
- Pine Tree Trail (2.7 miles (4.3 km))
- Rocky Point Trail (7.2 miles (11.6 km))
- Song Bird Trail (1 mile (1.6 km))

== See also ==
- Wildlife refuge
