= Ratcliff Lake Recreation Area =

Park in Texas, United States

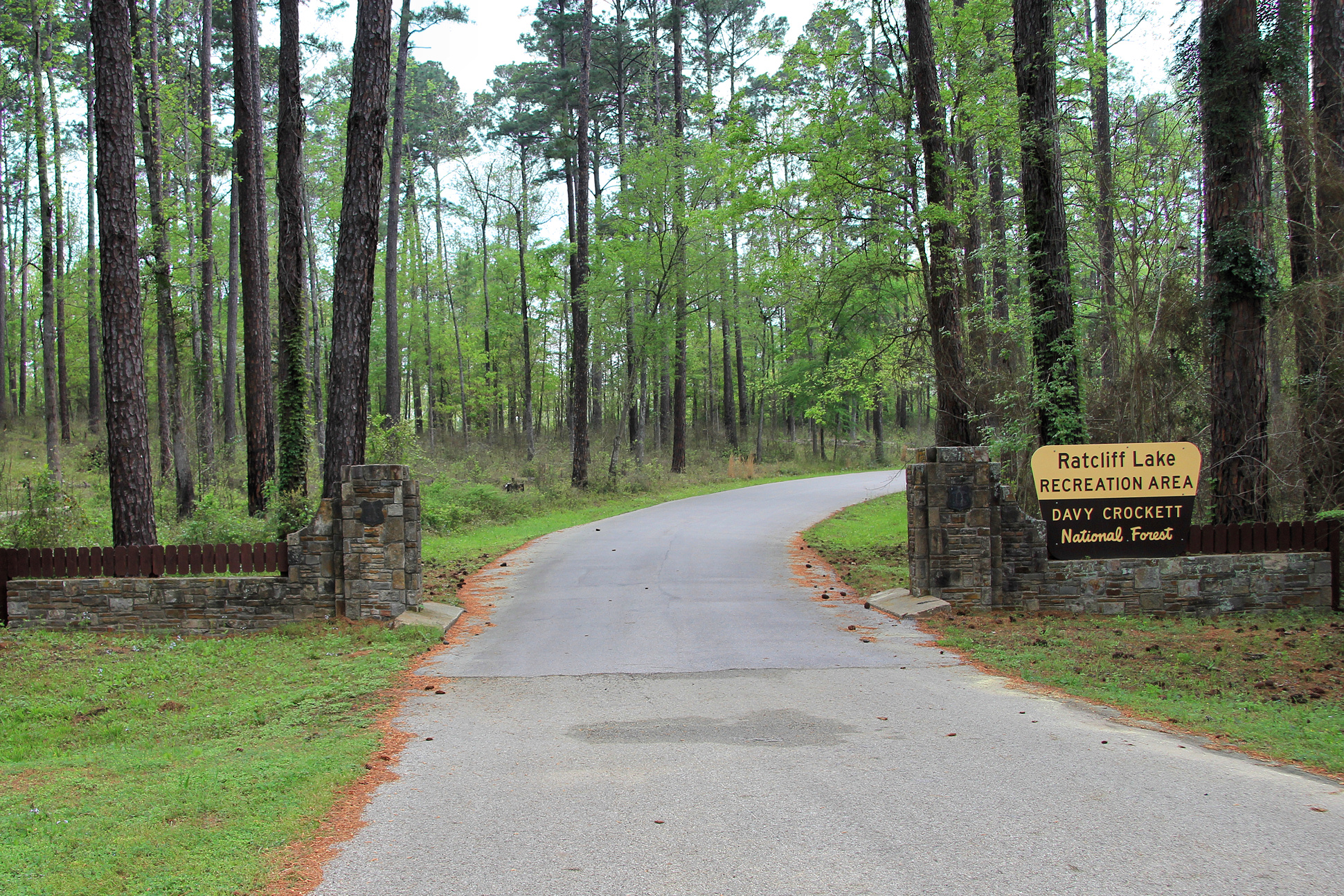
- Entrance to Ratcliff Lake Recreation Area

- Location within Texas
- Location: Houston County, Texas
- Nearest city: Kennard
- Coordinates: 31°23′19″N 95°9′17″W
- Established: 1936
- Governing body: United States Forest Service

Ratcliff Lake Recreation Area is a developed park within the Davy Crockett National Forest near Kennard, Texas, United States. The park surrounds a 45-acre (18 ha) lake that was once a mill pond and source of water for a sawmill which operated from 1902 to 1920. Ratcliff Lake Recreation Area was built in 1936 by the Civilian Conservation Corps (CCC) and is operated by the United States Forest Service (USFS). The facility is open year-round and includes a large campground, picnic areas, an amphitheater, a swim area and hiking trails.

== History ==
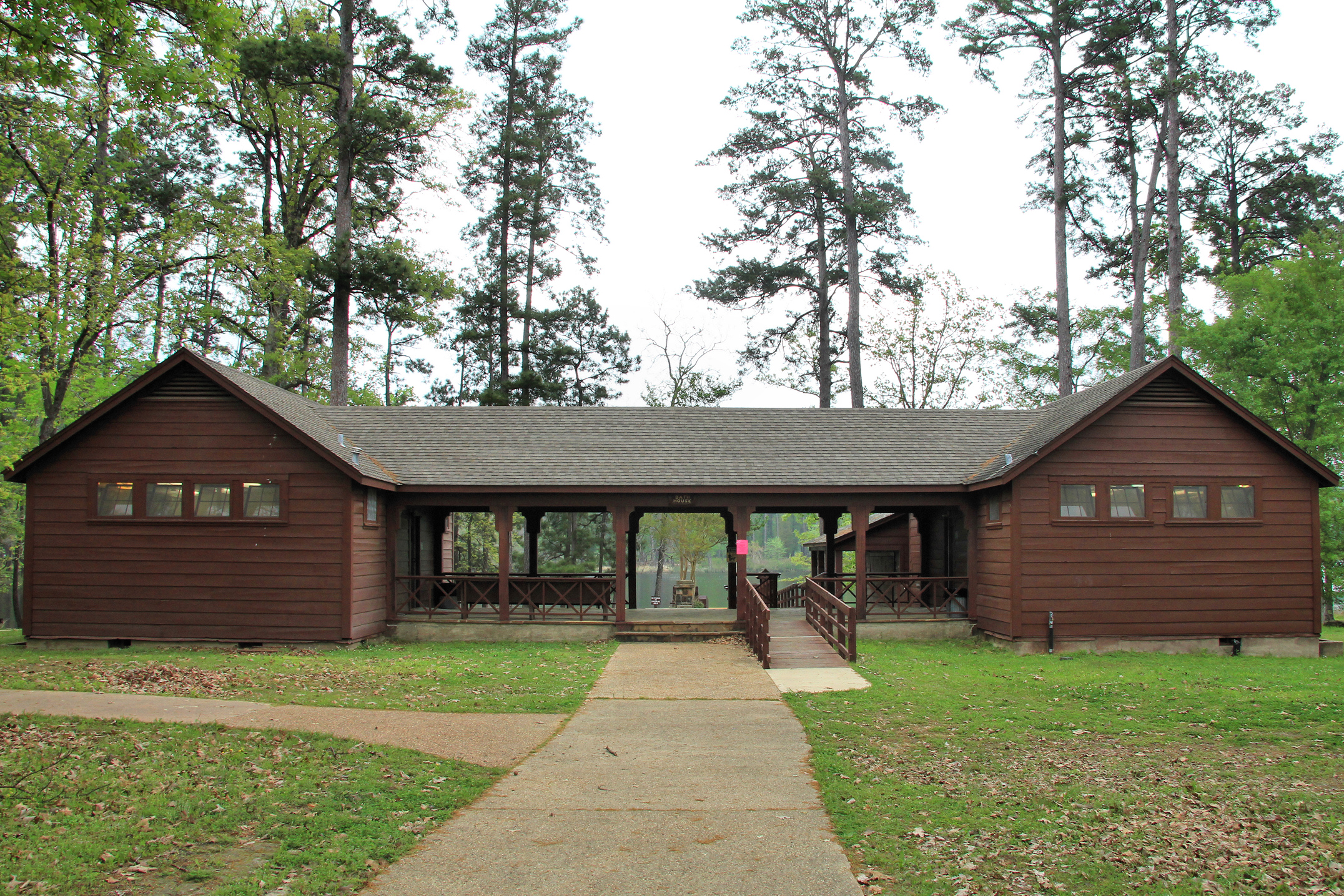
The bath house in the park built by the Civilian Conservation Corps.

In the late 19th century, pioneer settler J. H. Ratcliff operated a small sawmill in the virgin forests of East Texas. In 1899, the Central Coal and Coke Company of Kansas City, Missouri began buying land in the area along with the small sawmill. Central Coal and Coke eventually owned 120,000 acres (49,000 ha) of timberland. The company used Ratcliff's sawmill to produce materials to build the much larger "Four C Mill." By June 1902, the fourteen-acre (5.7 ha) mill complex produced 350,000 board feet (830 m^{3}) of lumber per day. By 1917, the company had cut all the larger old growth trees available. The company harvested the smaller trees between 1917 and 1920, but that could not keep the mill profitable and it ceased operation.

In October 1934, Civilian Conservation Corps Company 1803 set up camp in the area for project number F-4 to build Davy Crockett National Forest and Ratcliff Lake Recreation Area. The CCC built an earthen dam to turn the old sawmill pond into 45-acre Ratcliff Lake. They also built roads, a bath house and planted an estimated 3,000,000 trees to re-establish the forest.

Ratcliff Lake Recreation Area was closed in September 2008 due to damage from Hurricane Ike. After re-opening in 2010, damage caused by a tornado and then severe drought caused the park to close again between April 2011 and September 2012.

== Flora and fauna ==
The area is heavily forested with loblolly pine, oak and other hardwoods. A wide variety of wildlife inhabit the area, including the endangered red-cockaded woodpecker. The lake contains largemouth bass, bream, channel catfish and blue catfish
