= Martin Dies Jr. State Park =

State park in Texas, United States

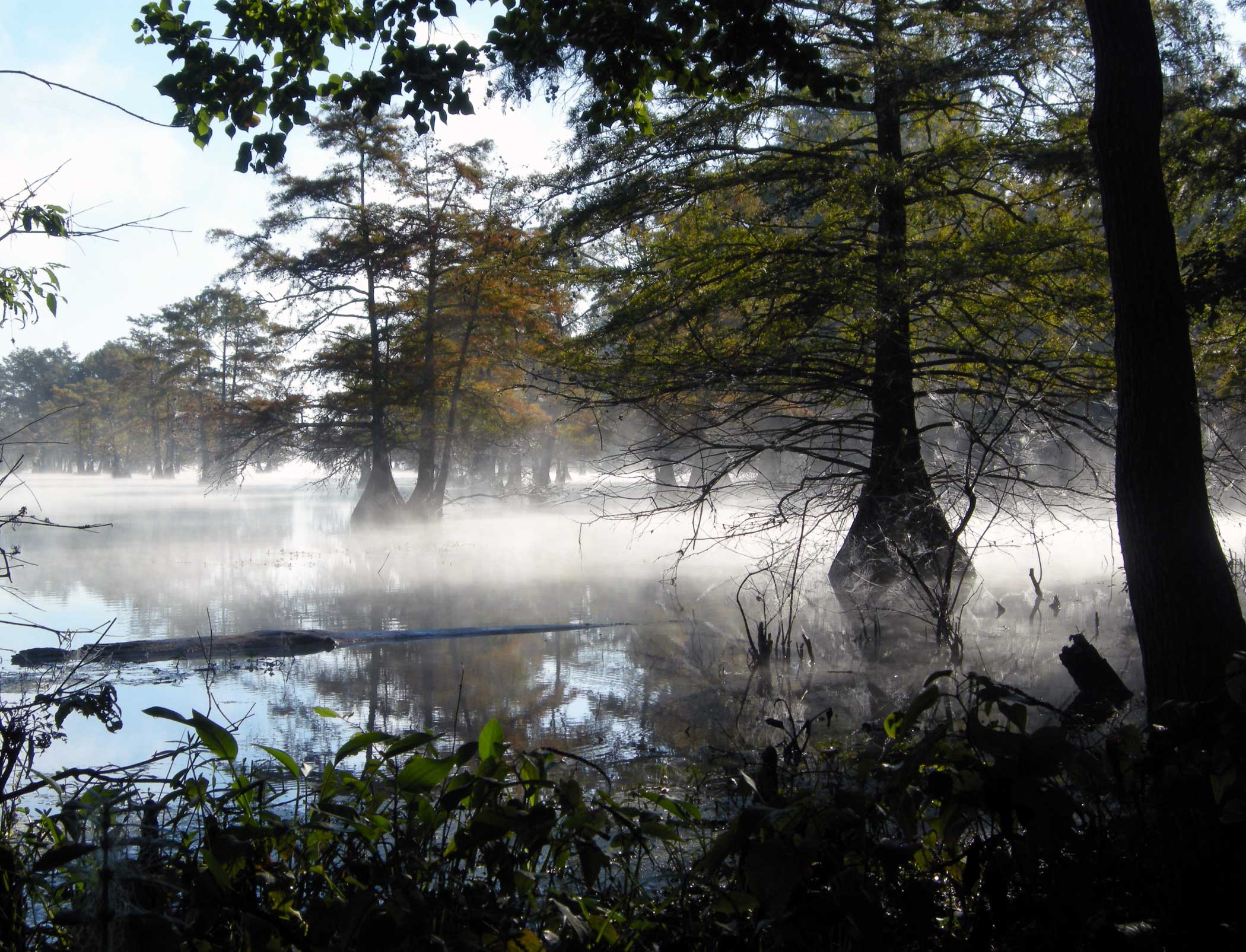
- Morning mist on Steinhagen Reservoir, Martin Dies Jr. State Park, Texas

- Location within Texas Location within the United States
- Location: Jasper County, Texas; Tyler County, Texas
- Nearest city: Jasper, Texas
- Coordinates: 30°51′08″N 94°10′15″W
- Area: 705 acres (285 ha)
- Created: 1965
- Named for: Martin Dies Jr.
- Visitors: 73,013 (in 2025)
- Governing body: Texas Parks and Wildlife Department
- Website: Official site

Martin Dies Jr. State Park is a 705 acres (285 ha) state park located along U.S. Route 190 on the banks of the Steinhagen Reservoir in Jasper and Tyler counties in Texas. The park is managed by the Texas Parks and Wildlife Department. The park consists of three units; Hen House Ridge Unit, Walnut Ridge Unit and Cherokee Unit. Cherokee Unit is a day use area only, whereas the other two units allow camping.

== History ==
The state leased the park's land from the United States Army Corps of Engineers in 1964 and officially opened it as Dam B State Park in 1965, renaming it to honor State Senator Martin Dies Jr. the same year.

== Activities ==
The park offers recreational activities such as paddling, fishing, swimming, hiking, cycling, and volleyball. The park's distance from major cities means dark skies and it offers stargazing events at times.

== Nature ==
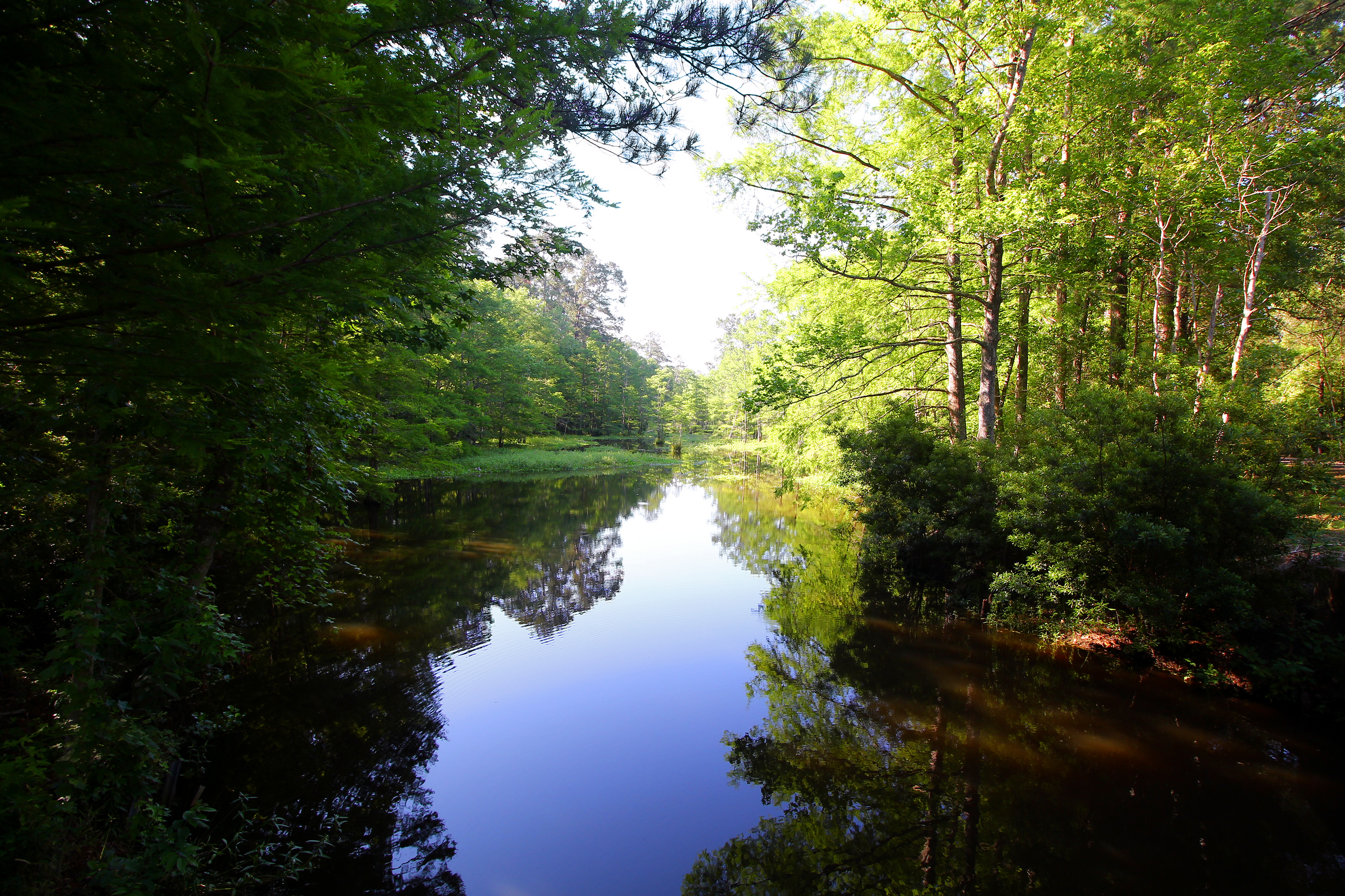
A slough in the park.

The park sits on the northern edge of the Big Thicket and south of where the Angelina River and Neches River meet. The two ecosystems contribute to the wide variety of plants and animals in the park.

=== Animals ===
Common mammals in the park include white-tailed deer, common raccoon, Virginia opossum, Mexican long-nosed armadillo, and eastern gray squirrel. Red fox, gray fox and bobcat make rare appearances. The American alligator exits in and around the waters of the lake and the park. Several venomous species of snake are found in the park such as Eastern copperhead, northern cottonmouth, timber rattlesnake and Texas coral snake. Look for snowy egret, great blue heron, yellow-crowned night heron, anhinga, swallow-tailed kite and pileated woodpecker in the park and on the lake.

=== Plants ===
The park is heavily forested. Loblolly, longleaf and shortleaf pine are abundant throughout the park. Bald cypress trees are found around the wetland areas. Water oak, southern red oak, sweet gum and southern magnolia dot the landscape. Smaller trees and shrubs such American beautyberry, wax myrtle, yaupon holly grow under the larger trees.

== See also ==
- List of Texas state parks
