= Texas Water Development Board =

The Texas Water Development Board is an agency of the government of Texas with authority over water development in the state. The Board appoints directors for regional water development agencies such as the Lower Neches Valley Authority.

In the 2007 Texas constitutional amendment election, Proposition 16 on the ballot passed with more than 60% of the vote, allowing the board to issue up to $250 million in bonds to find its operations.

== Texas Geographic Information Office ==
Texas Geographic Information Office

Division overview
- Formed: 1968; 57 years ago
- Type: Division
- Jurisdiction: Texas
- Headquarters: Austin, Texas; 30°16′46″N 97°44′22″W
- Motto: Providing the Highest Level of Geographic Data Services to the People of Texas
- Employees: 25
- Division executive: Director, Richard Wade
- Parent board: Texas Water Development Board
- Website: geographic.texas.gov

The Texas Geographic Information Office (TxGIO) is a division of the Texas Water Development Board that maintains the geographic information system (GIS) of the government of Texas. It serves as the principal archive for natural resources data in the state. The Texas Geographic Information Officer servers as the director of TxGIO and also coordinates the Texas Geographic Names Committee.

=== History ===
TxGIO was established by the Texas Legislature in 1968 as the Texas Water-Oriented Data Bank. In 1972, after four years of growth and diversification, it was renamed the Texas Natural Resources Information System (TNRIS). In 2023, the 88th Texas Legislature officially renamed TNRIS to the Texas Geographic Information Office.

=== Services ===
The mission of TxGIO is to provide a "centralized information system incorporating all Texas natural resource data, socioeconomic data related to natural resources, and indexes related to that data that are collected by state agencies or other entities." (Texas Water Code, 16.021).

TxGIO provides a central access point for Texas Natural Resources data, census data, digital and paper maps, and information about datasets collected by state agencies and other organizations. It publishes historical and current aerial photography and printed topographic maps from the United States Geological Survey as part of its public domain data warehouse. It also provides GIS educational services.

The TxGIO offices are located in the Stephen F. Austin Building, 1700 North Congress Avenue, in Austin, Texas.
