= Neches River =

River in East Texas

Neches River Río de las Neches
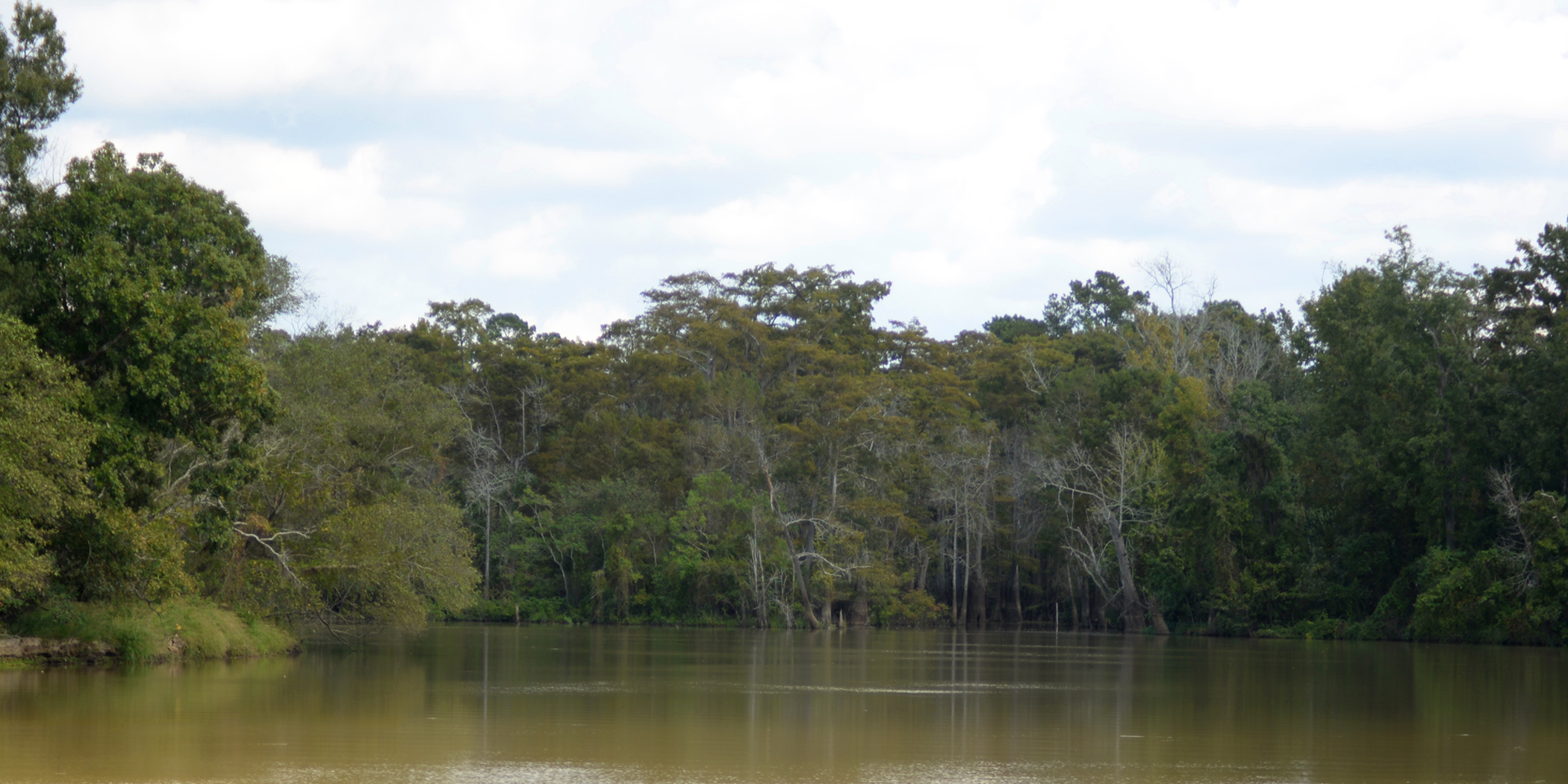
- Neches River, looking into the Big Thicket National Preserve from Orange County, Texas, USA (October 2016)

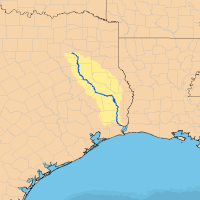
- Map of the Neches River and associated watershed
- Native name: Nachawi (Caddo)

Physical characteristics
- Source
  - location: East of Colfax, Texas
  - coordinates: 32°30′N 95°45′W
- Mouth
  - location: Sabine Lake
  - coordinates: 29°58′08″N 93°51′21″W
- Length: 416 mi (669 km)
- Basin size: 10,011 sq mi (25,930 km^{2})

Basin features
- Tributaries
  - left: Flat Creek; Village Creek; Pine Island Bayou
  - right: Bayou La Nana; Ayish Bayou; Angelina River
- Waterbodies: Rhine Lake; Lake Palestine; Steinhagen Reservoir

The Neches River (/ˈneɪtʃɪz/) begins in Van Zandt County west of Rhine Lake and flows for 416 miles (669 km) through the piney woods of east Texas, defining the boundaries of 14 counties on its way to its mouth on Sabine Lake near the Rainbow Bridge. Two major reservoirs, Lake Palestine and B. A. Steinhagen Reservoir are located on the Neches. The Angelina River (containing Sam Rayburn Reservoir) is a major tributary with its confluence at the north of Lake B. A. Steinhagen. Tributaries to the south include Village Creek and Pine Island Bayou, draining much of the Big Thicket region, both joining the Neches a few miles north of Beaumont. Towns and cities located along the river including Tyler, Lufkin, and Silsbee, although significant portions of the Neches River are undeveloped and flow through protected natural lands. In contrast, the lower 40 miles of the river are a major shipping channel, highly industrialized, with a number of cities and towns concentrated in the area including Beaumont, Vidor, Port Neches, Nederland, Groves, and Port Arthur.

== Etymology ==
It is believed that the name of the river was derived from the Caddo word "Nachawi", meaning "wood of the bow", after Spanish settlers called it Río Neches.

== Untamed river ==
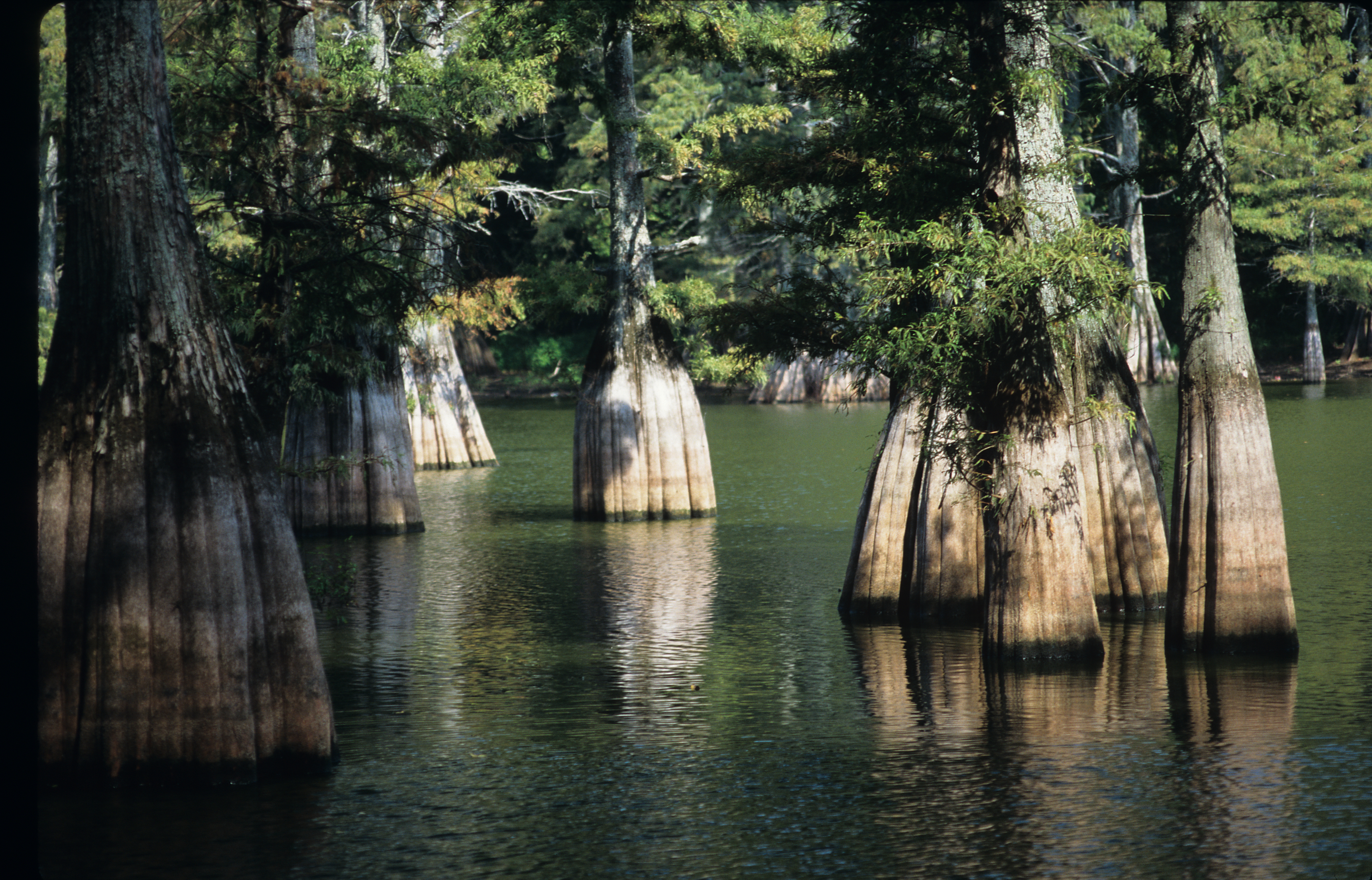
Bald cypress (Taxodium distichum), Big Thicket National Preserve

With the exception of dams and manmade lakes, much of the river is in a natural state. Approximately 11 miles of the upper Neches flows through the Neches River National Wildlife Refuge, established to protect the biologically diverse bottomland hardwood forest and habitat for migratory birds, and opened to the public as recently as 2019. Downstream, the river delineates the eastern border of Davy Crockett National Forest including more than nine miles of the Big Slough Wilderness Area of the National Forest. Further downstream the Neches defines much of the southern border of Angelina National Forest including roughly four miles of the Upland Island and Longleaf Pine Wilderness Area of Angelina National Forest. The Angelina Neches/Dam B Wildlife Management Area is situated at the confluence of the Neches and Angelina Rivers protecting 12,636 acres of the river's floodplain and bottomland, administered by the Texas Parks and Wildlife Department along with the adjacent Martin Dies Jr. State Park on the eastern side of Lake B. A. Steinhagen. South of the Lake, beginning at Town Bluff Dam and running 56 miles south to Beaumont, is the Neches River Corridor Unit of the Big Thicket National Preserve, administered by the National Park Service. The Big Thicket National Preserve is recognized as a biosphere reserve by UNESCO, preserving an area where several ecosystems converge. The Big Thicket Visitor Center is off U.S. Highway 69 several miles north of Kountze, Texas.

Beginning in 2006, the United States Fish and Wildlife Service purchased land along the Neches River for the creation of the Neches River National Wildlife Refuge. The refuge includes land on which the city of Dallas had proposed to build a reservoir to meet the water needs of the city and its surrounding suburbs. Tentatively named Lake Fastrill, this reservoir was not scheduled to be built until 2050. The city of Dallas and the Texas Water Development Board filed a lawsuit in 2007 against the U.S. Fish and Wildlife Service, claiming the wildlife refuge was established without considering the economic and environmental impacts. However, in February 2010 the United States Supreme Court ruled in favor of the U.S. Fish and Wildlife Service, paving the way for the acquisition of lands for the wildlife refuge.

The Lower Neches Valley Authority is the river authority which oversees the Neches River in Tyler, Hardin, Liberty, Chambers, and Jefferson counties of Texas.

== Industrialized river ==
The lower forty miles of the river is industrialized, from the Beaumont Interstate 10 bridge to Sabine Lake. The river is maintained as a deep water ship channel running between the Port of Beaumont to Sabine Lake. Currently 40 feet deep and 400 ft wide, the river is being deepened to 48 feet. The total estimated cost of the Sabine-Neches Waterway project is $1.1 billion.

Several petro-chemical plants are located in the river's southern section. The Sabine-Neches Navigation District, formed in 1909, has management responsibilities of the portion of the river which is part of the Sabine-Neches Waterway.

Views of the industrialized portion
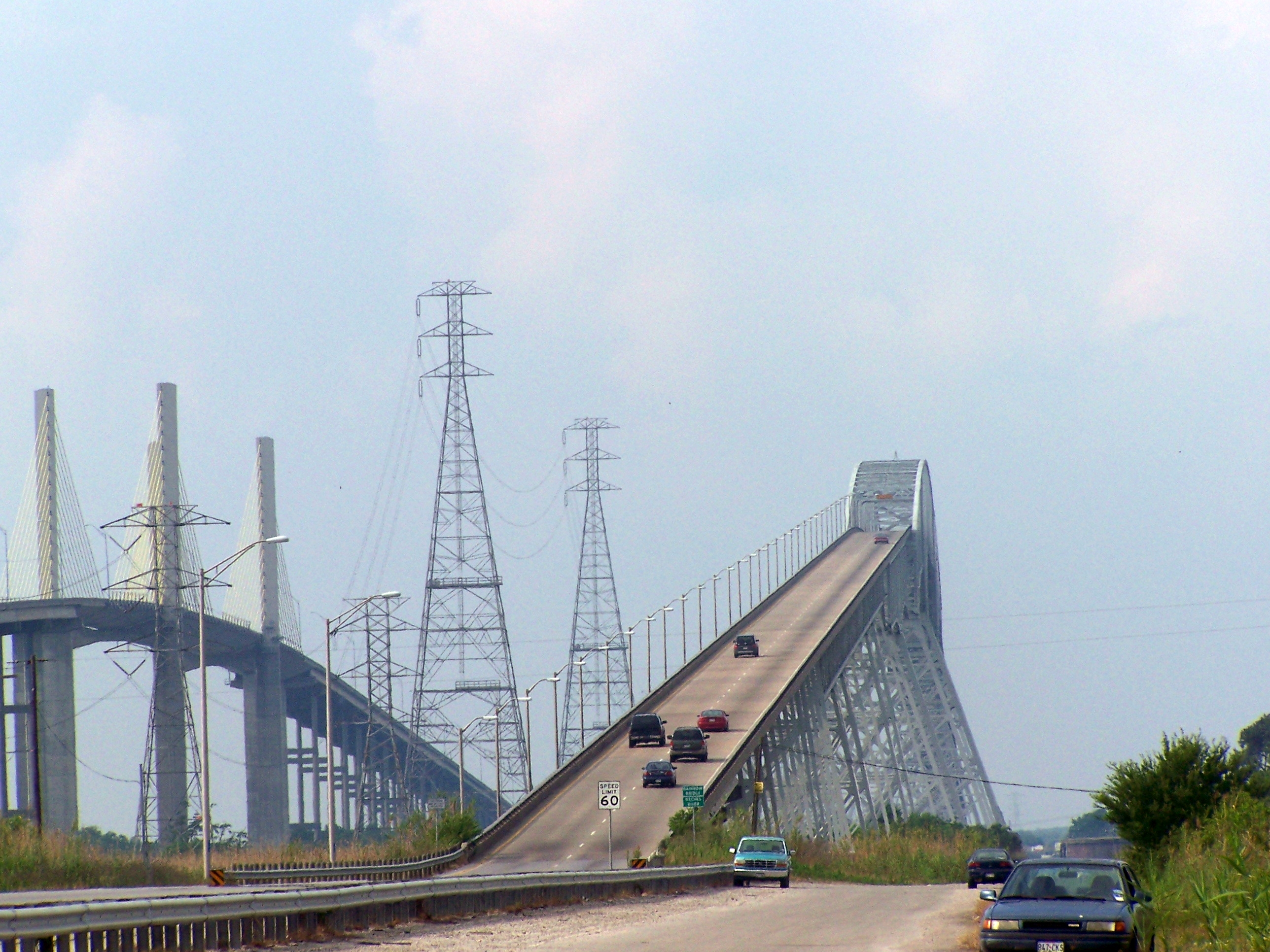
Rainbow and Veteran's Memorial bridges near river mouth

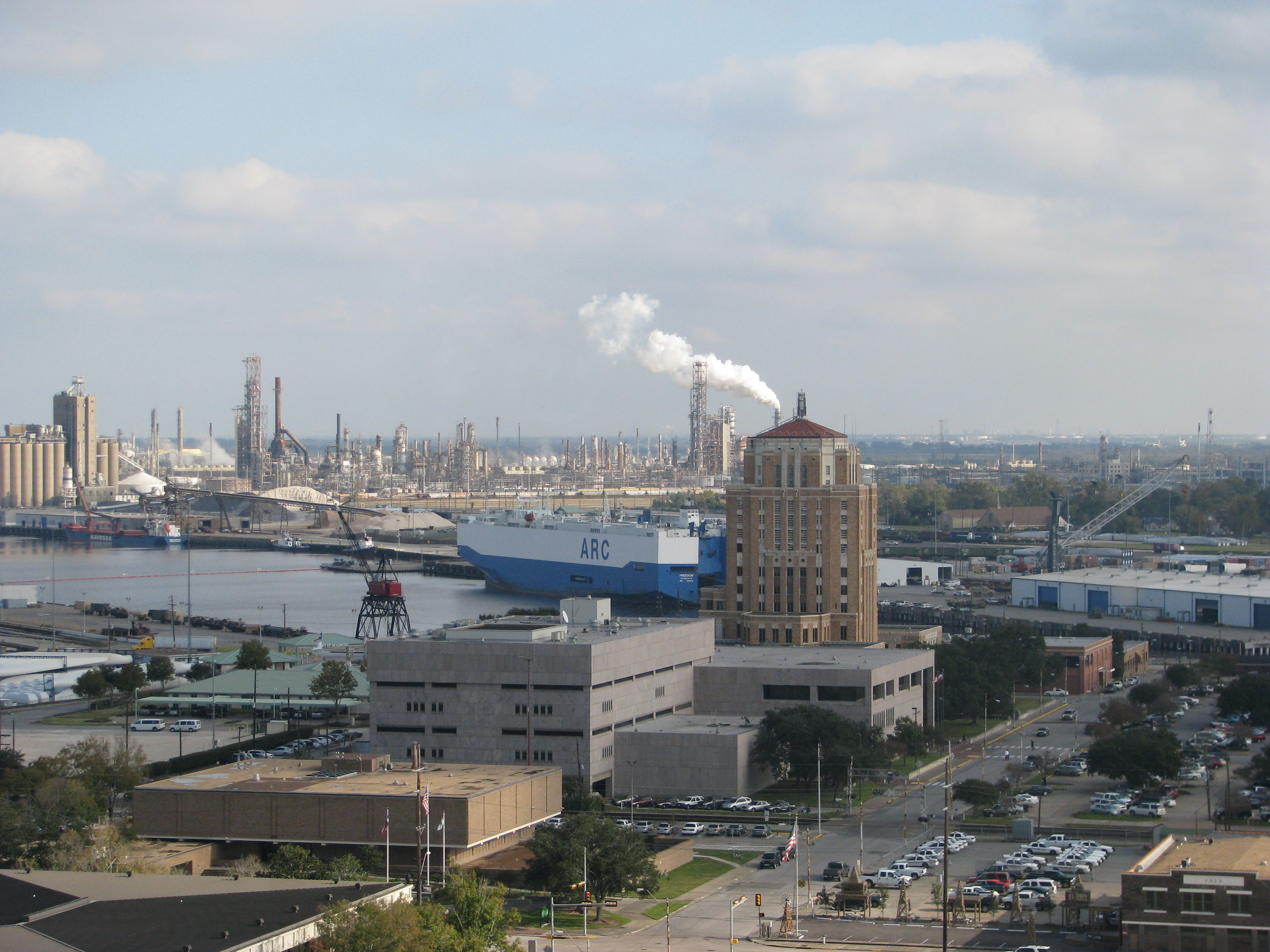
View of a portion of Port of Beaumont

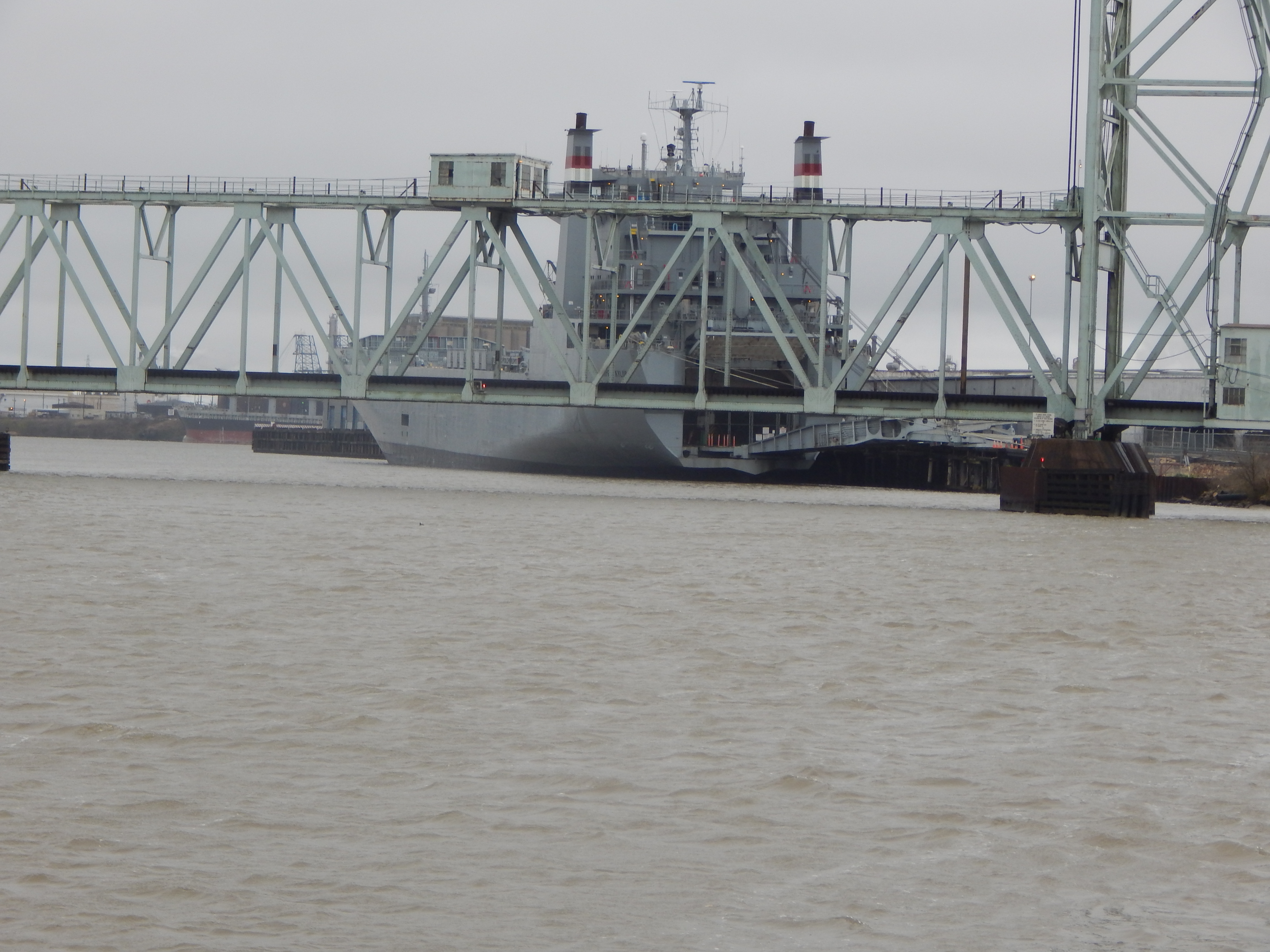
Port of Beaumont looking toward wharfs 5,6,&7

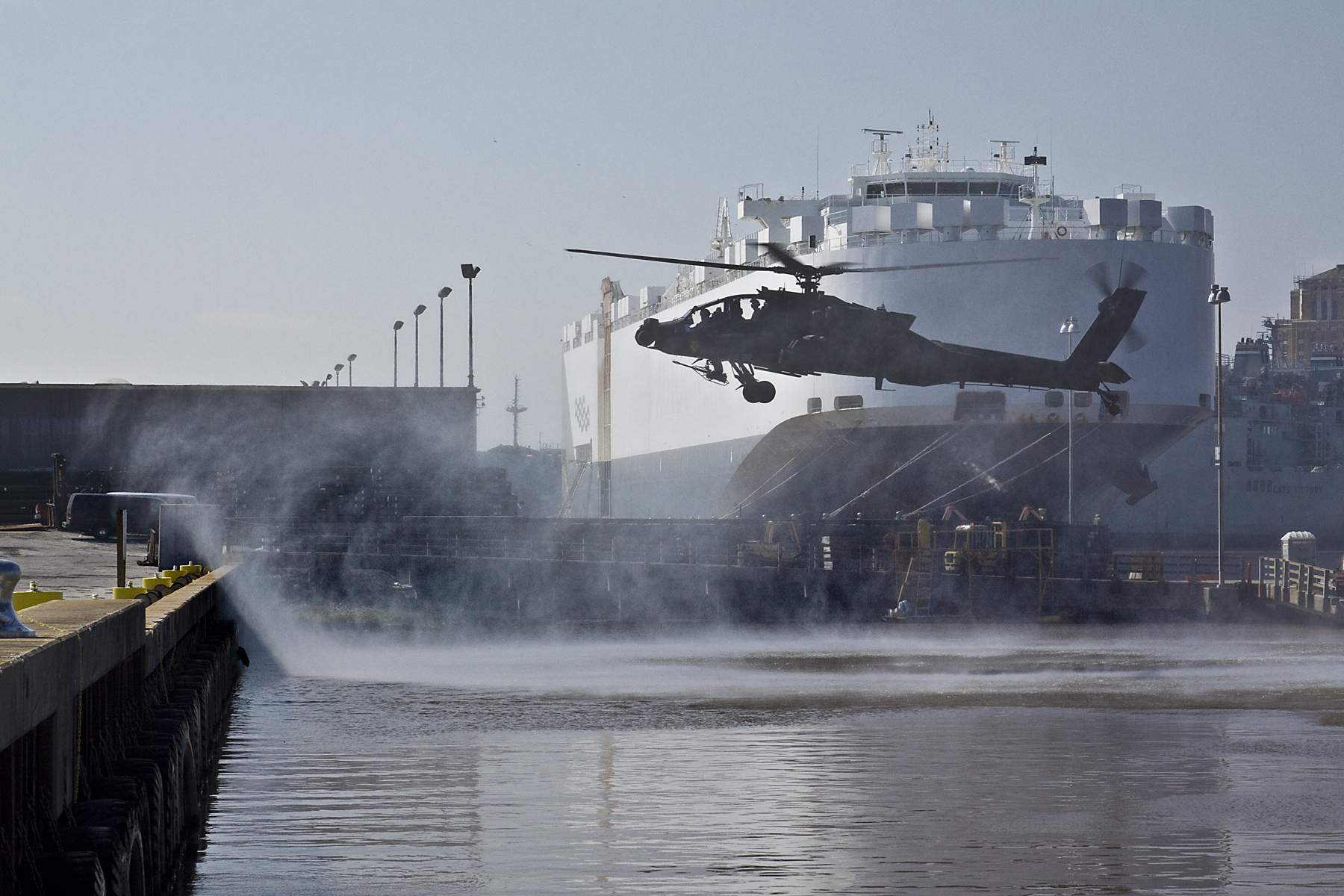
1st Air Cavalry Brigade Takes Birds to Port of Beaumont

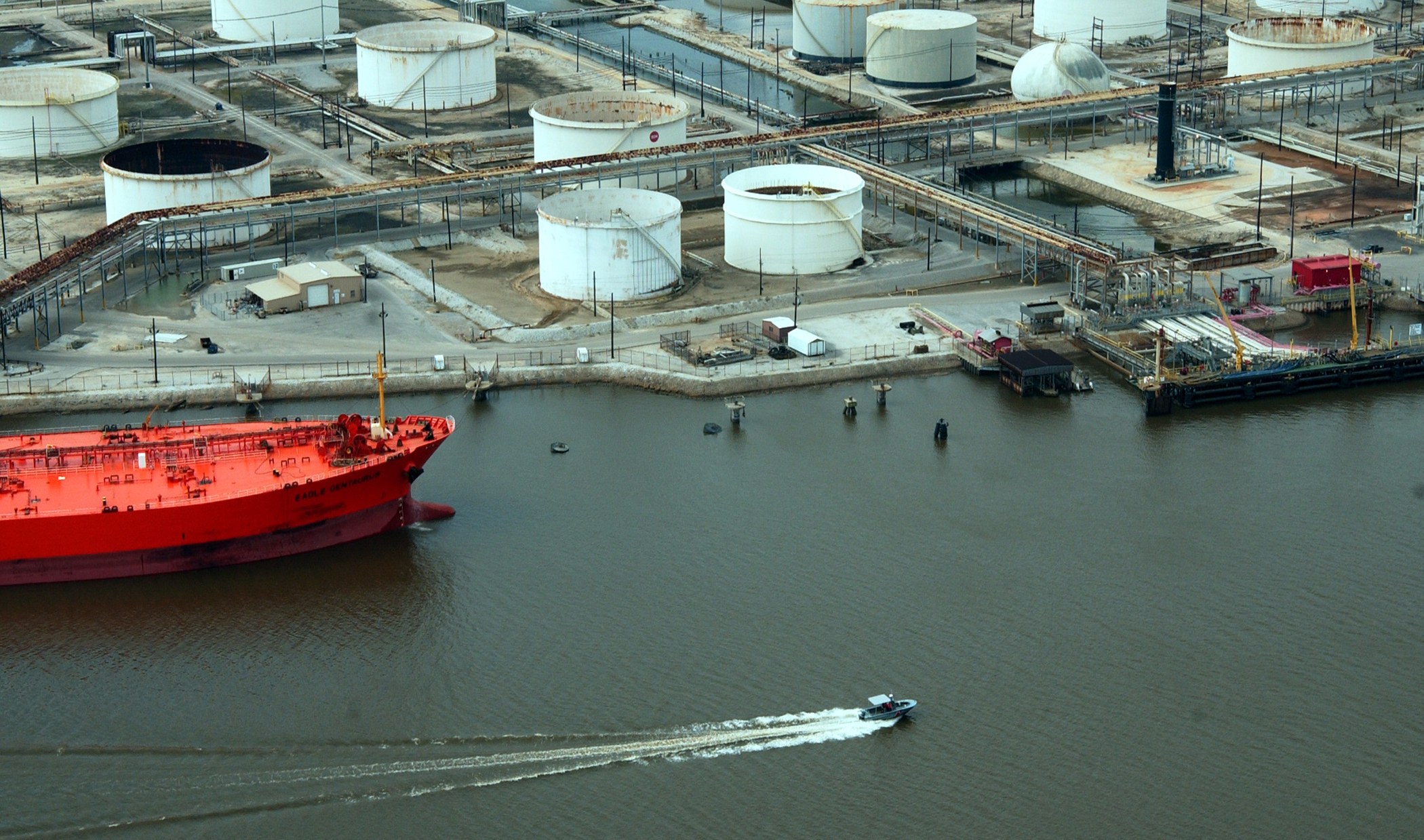
River view at one of the petro-chemical facilities

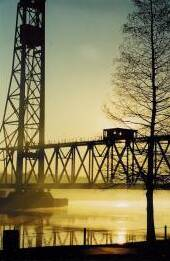
The CPKC, ex-KCS Railway bridge over the Neches River in Beaumont is a major transportation link for the region.

== Points of interest ==
- Lake Palestine
- Neches River National Wildlife Refuge
- B. A. Steinhagen Reservoir
- Big Thicket National Preserve
- The Port of Beaumont is located on the Neches River at Beaumont, Texas. It begins near the mouth of the river and the Rainbow Bridge.

== See also ==
- List of Texas rivers
- USS Neches (AO-5) — a fleet oiler built in 1920.
- Sabine-Neches Waterway
- Lower Neches Valley Authority
- Neches, Texas
- Sabine River (Texas-Louisiana)
