= Big Slough Wilderness =

Protected area in Davy Crockett National Forest

- IUCN category Ib (wilderness area)
- Location within Texas Location within the United States
- Location: Houston County, Texas, United States
- Nearest city: Lufkin, TX
- Coordinates: 31.4937905°N 95.1174384°W
- Area: 3,455 acres (1,398 ha)
- Established: 1984
- Governing body: U.S. Forest Service
- Website: www.fs.usda.gov/detail/texas/specialplaces/?cid=stelprdb5291446

The Big Slough Wilderness is a 3,455-acre (1,398 ha) protected area in Davy Crockett National Forest in Houston County, Texas, United States. The area was added to the National Wilderness Preservation System in 1984 with the passage of the Texas Wilderness Act. It is the smallest wilderness in Texas. Logging occurred in the area during the 1800s, and the regrown forest consists of 66 percent hardwoods, 26 percent shortleaf and loblolly pines, four percent a mixture of hardwoods and pines, and four percent water.
