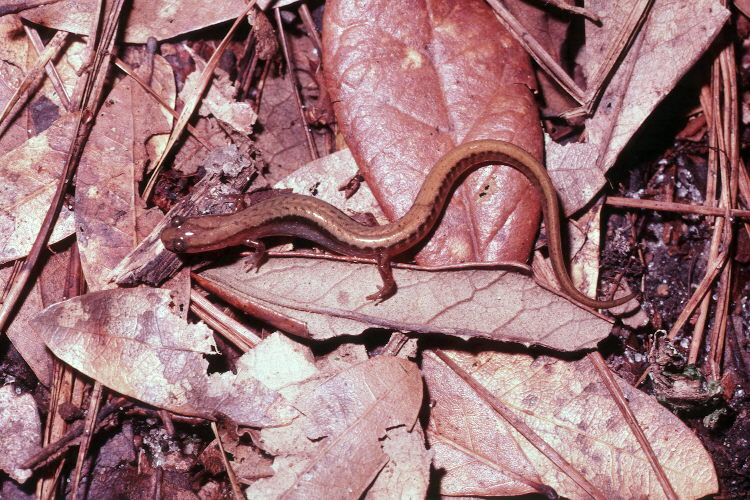

Conservation status
- Least Concern (IUCN 3.1)

- Secure (NatureServe)

Scientific classification
- Kingdom: Animalia
- Phylum: Chordata
- Class: Amphibia
- Order: Urodela
- Family: Plethodontidae
- Genus: Eurycea
- Species: E. quadridigitata

Binomial name
- Eurycea quadridigitata (Holbrook, 1842)

Synonyms
- Salamandra quadridigitata Holbrook, 1842; Batrachoseps quadridigitata Baird, 1850; Manculus quadridigitatus Cope, 1869; Manculus remifer Cope, 1871

= Southeastern dwarf salamander =

Species of amphibian

The southeastern dwarf salamander (Eurycea quadridigitata), formerly known as the dwarf salamander, is a species of salamander native to the southern United States, ranging primarily from southern North Carolina south to northern Florida, with some populations from southwestern Alabama to eastern Louisiana. Some sources refer to it as the four-fingered manculus, dwarf four-toed salamander, or the Florida dwarf salamander.

== Taxonomy ==
A review of E. quadridigitata published in 2017 identified five cryptic species within E. quadridigitata based on molecular evidence.

- Eurycea chamberlaini Harrison and Guttman, 2003: North Carolina and interior areas of South Carolina
- Eurycea sphagnicola Wray, Means, and Steppan, 2017: Southern Mississippi, Alabama, and far western Florida panhandle
- Eurycea hillisi Wray, Means, and Steppan, 2017: interior regions of Alabama and Georgia
- Eurycea paludicola (Mittleman, 1947): Louisiana, Texas and Arkansas
- Eurycea quadridigitata sensu stricto (Holbrook, 1842): North Carolina south to Florida, west to Louisiana

== Description ==
The southeastern dwarf salamander grows from 2.0 to 3.5 inches in length. It has a slender body and a long tail. It is typically yellow-brown in color with darker brown blotching and dark stripes down each side, but the pattern and coloration can vary widely. The epithet quadridigitata is to denote that each of its feet has four toes.

== Behavior ==
The southeastern dwarf salamander prefers habitats of swampy pine woods. It is nocturnal and spends most of its time under leaf litter or forest floor debris. Breeding occurs in the fall, with 12 to 48 eggs being laid singly or in small clutches attached to submerged debris in shallow, slow moving or still water.
