= Pine Island Bayou =

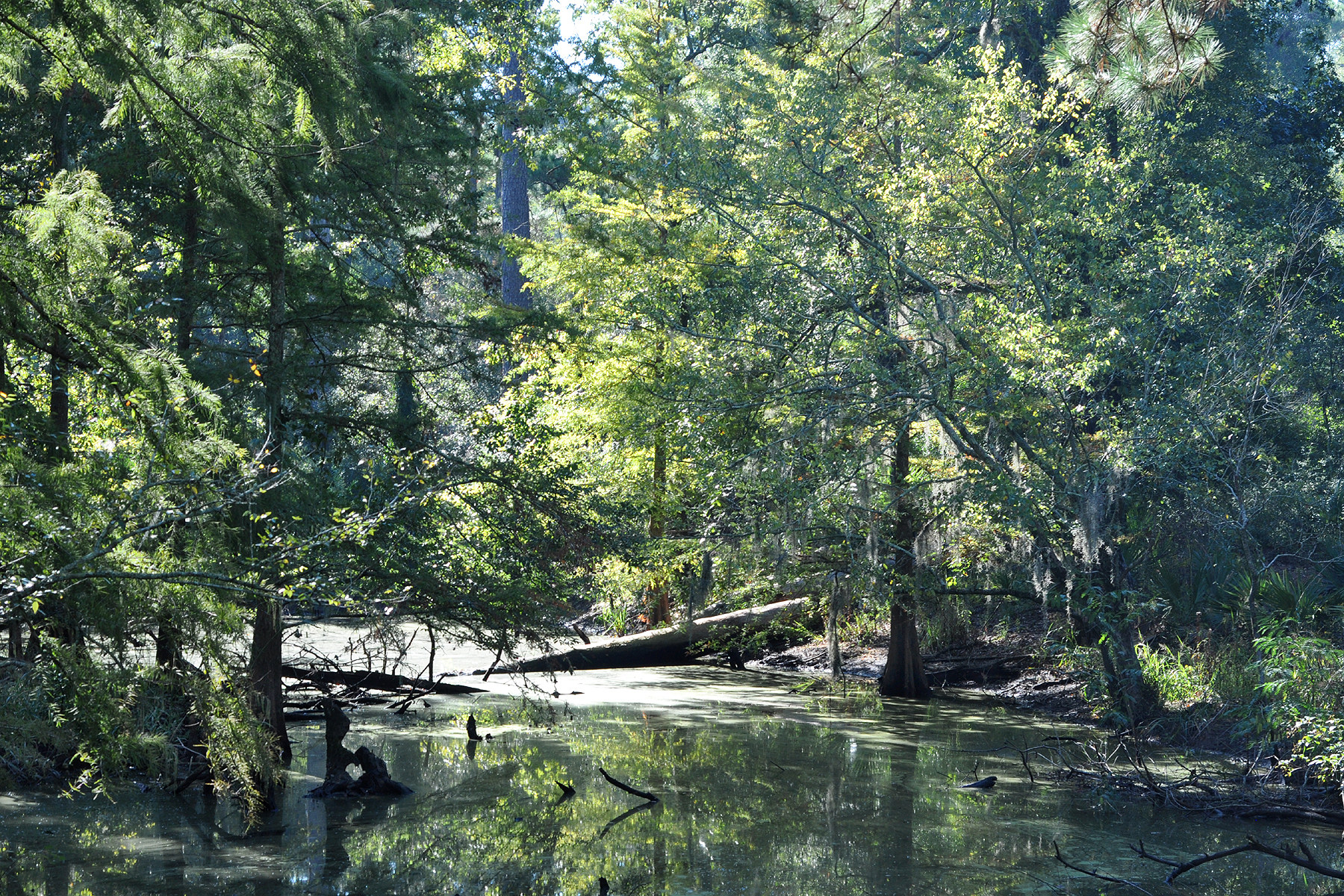
- Little Pine Island Bayou, Big Thicket National Preserve

Location
- Country: United States

Physical characteristics
- Source
  - location: circa Liberty/Hardin County line, Texas (ca. 30.4135°N, 94.6781°W)
  - elevation: ca. 35 m.
- Mouth
  - location: East end of Hardin/Jefferson county line, Texas (30.1625°N, 94.1155°W)
  - elevation: 1 m.
- Length: ca. 55 miles

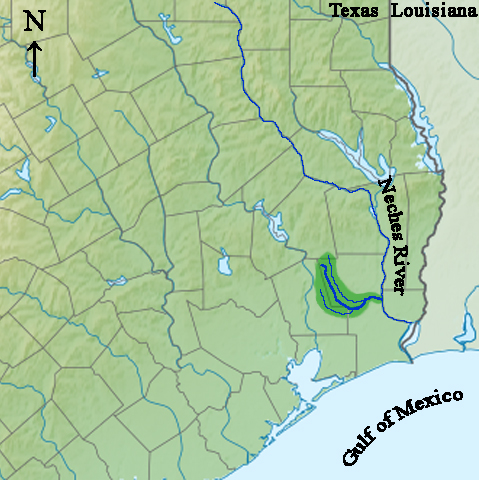
Pine Island Bayou map: drainage basin highlighted in green; Pine Island Bayou heavy blue line; Mayhaw Creek (southwest) and Little Pine Island Bayou (northeast) fine blue lines

Pine Island Bayou is a tributary of the Neches River located in southeast Texas. It runs about 55 miles from the northwest corner of Hardin County, Texas and flows in a southeastern direction through western Hardin County, turning east and defining the southern Hardin and Jefferson County boundary for about 20 miles until its confluence with the Neches River. Two significant tributaries of Pine Island Bayou are Mayhaw Creek and Little Pine Island Bayou. The lower ten miles of Pine Island Bayou and much of Little Pine Island Bayou are protected from development in the Big Thicket National Preserve. Excluding the last few miles north of Beaumont, the area is not densely populated, and some small towns include Sour Lake and Saratoga, the latter the birthplace of country singer George Jones.

== Geography and biodiversity ==
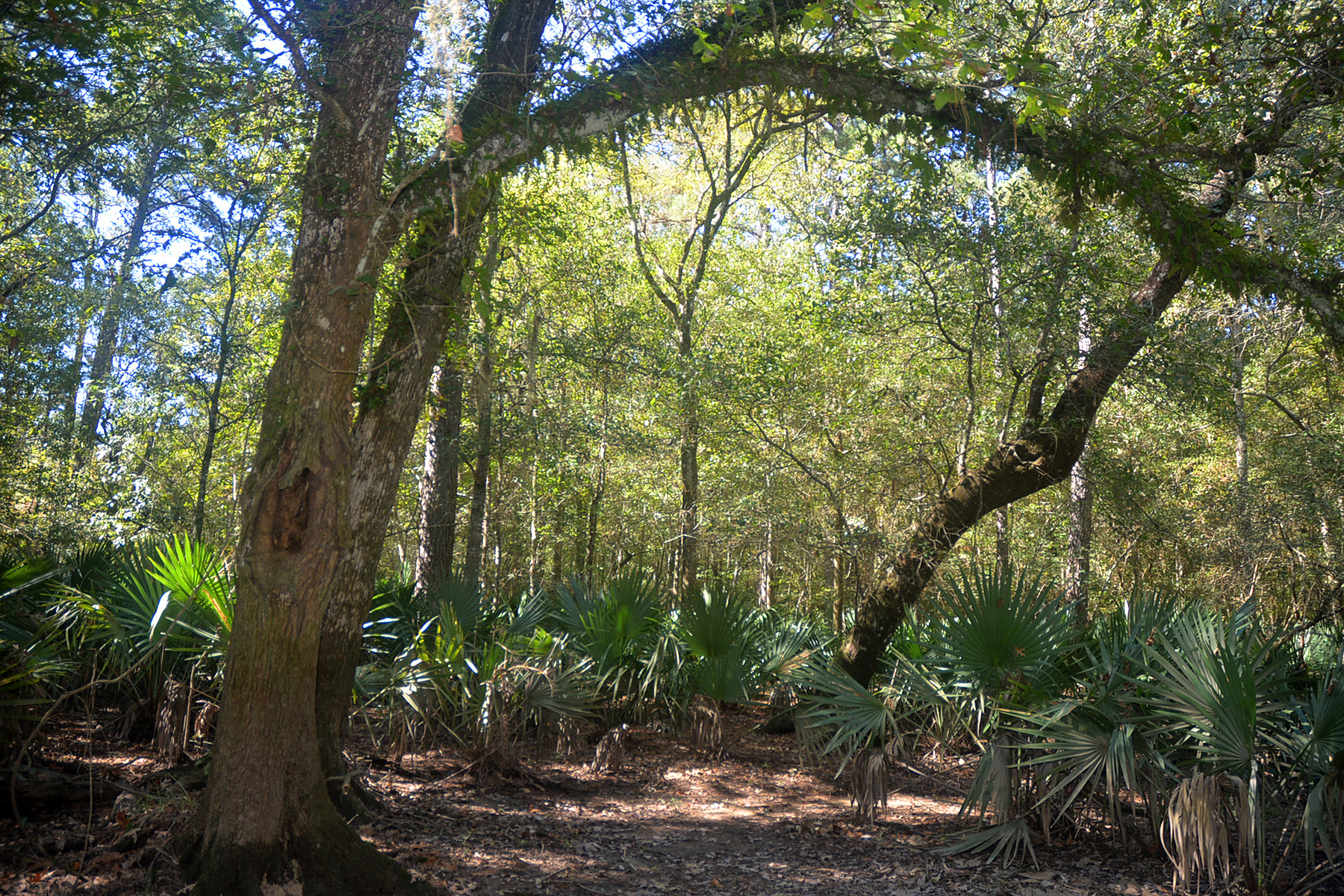
Palmetto-oak flats habitat in the Pine Island Bayou basin. Big Thicket National Preserve, Hardin Co. Texas (October 2019)

The Pine Island Bayou drainage basin is the very heart of the Big Thicket. The basin is sometimes referred to as the "Traditional Thicket" or "The Old Bear Hunters' Thicket" and it has a high diversity of flora and fauna. It is a flat, low-lying region of floodplains and bottomland, with sluggish blackwater. The areas is characterized by swamps, cypress sloughs, hardwood bottomland, palmetto-oak flats, and baygalls. Some typical flora include water tupelo (Nyssa aquatica) and bald cypress trees (Taxodium distichum) draped with Spanish moss (Tillandsia usneoides); rattan-vine (Berchemia scandens) and muscadine vine (Vitis rotundifolia) climbing through forest of black gum (Nyssa sylvatica), water hickory (Carya aquatica), sweet gum (Liquidambar styraciflua), and several species of oak trees such as overcup oak (Quercus lyrata), laurel oak (Quercus laurifolia), willow oak (Quercus phellos), and water oak (Quercus nigra). Dwarf palmetto (Sabal minor) may fill the understory in some areas.

The black bear (Ursus americanus) once common in the area were extirpated by the first few years of the 20th century. A few of the animals found in the area include northern river otter (Lontra canadensis), bobcat (Lynx rufus), American beaver (Castor canadensis), American alligator (Alligator mississippiensis), alligator snapping turtle (Macrochelys temminckii), cottonmouth (Agkistrodon piscivorus), and several species of non-venomous watersnake (Nerodia). One source stated that Pine Island Bayou had a total of 56 species of fish on record, including alligator gar (Atractosteus spatula), bowfin (Amia calva), largemouth bass (Micropterus salmoides), channel catfish (Ictalurus punctatus), yellow bullhead (Ictalurus natalis), warmouth (Lepomis gulosus), and bluegill sunfish (Lepomis macrochirus).
