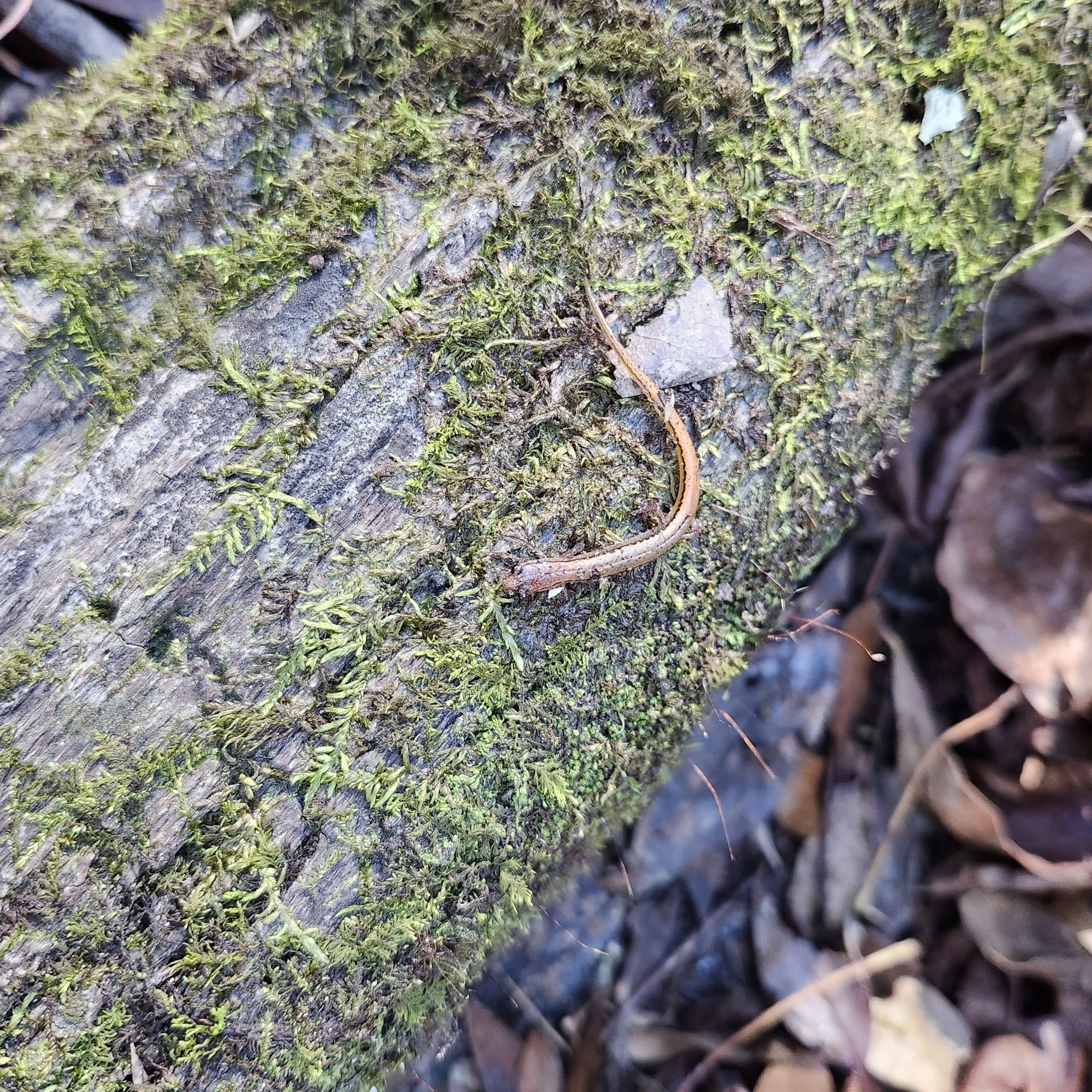

Conservation status
- Least Concern (IUCN 3.1)

- Vulnerable (NatureServe)

Scientific classification
- Kingdom: Animalia
- Phylum: Chordata
- Class: Amphibia
- Order: Urodela
- Family: Plethodontidae
- Genus: Eurycea
- Species: E. hillisi

Binomial name
- Eurycea hillisi Wray, Means, and Steppan, 2017

= Hillis's dwarf salamander =

Species of salamander

Hillis's dwarf salamander (Eurycea hillisi) is a species of salamander native to the southern region of the United States of America. First observed in 2012, E. hillisi, like most other amphibians, abides principally in wetlands and swamps, or habitats close to a water source, such as a pond or river. According to the IUCN red list, E. hillisi is a species of "least concern." After approximately one year, the species reaches maturity, and breeds during the winter months.

== Taxonomy and Species Description ==
Eurycea hillisi was first described in a 2017 study by Wray, Means, and Steppan. It was previously thought to be a population of the southeastern dwarf salamander (E. quadridigitata), but distinctively only has 4 toes on its hindlimbs. It also has more consistent coloring compared to other plethodontids across the 20 observed members, displaying a copper or orange brown exterior. While not extensively described until 2017, E. hillisi was likely first observed by Lamb and Beamer in their 2012 study of the evolution of 4 toes in members of the Eurycea genus. It is named in honor of American evolutionary biologist David Hillis.

== Conservation and IUCN status ==
The Hillis' dwarf salamander has been classified as a species of "least concern" on the IUCN red list for endangered species, meaning it is not in danger of going extinct anytime soon. However it is quite rare and extremely hard to find. The IUCN also notes that invasive species and human caused habitat loss are the key threats this species faces. Conservation efforts that help protect the swamps and marshes these animals call home is recommended.

== Distribution, Habitat, and Range ==
The Hillis' dwarf salamander ranges into the southern part of Alabama, the central part of the Florida panhandle, and mid-central Georgia. To date, it has not been found further east than the Ogeechee River basin in Georgia and the Chipola and Choctawhatchee rivers in Florida

Concerning habitat, The Eurycea Hillisi reside in Bay swamps, Upper ends of beaver ponds(and the periphery), isolated wetlands, streams, and seepage ravines. Examples include the Apalachicola National Forest, the Mobile Bay River Delta area, and the river basins mentioned above. It should also be noted that encountering an Eurycea Hillisi is best done with Sphagnum moss, as it meets all the habitat characteristics regarding moisture and protection.

== Reproductive cycle ==
A study performed in east-central Alabama was conducted on the reproductive behavior of Hillis's dwarf salamander (Eurycea hillisi). The species was found to reach maturity around the end of a year of life. The samples for the study were collected across December 1976 to February 1979. A large amount of them were collected whilst they were crossing roads in seemingly a breeding migration. This behavior seems to be associated with rains in late autumn/early winter rains. Reproductive condition of the males and females testes and ovaries were examined. Mature spermatozoa was observed in males from the middle of to late December. The marker for reproductive preparedness in females were observed most commonly from late winter to early autumn. If breeding conditions are met during a time in which a males testes had no spermatozoa they are still able to breed. They are able to do this, because even though the testes lack spermatozoa they have the ability to store an amount of it in their vasa deferentia. The vasa deferentia contains sperm October through early February. Other known behavior is the direct correlation between female mating peak and their snout-vent length. The study also found a brooding type behavior was documented in females during the month of February.
