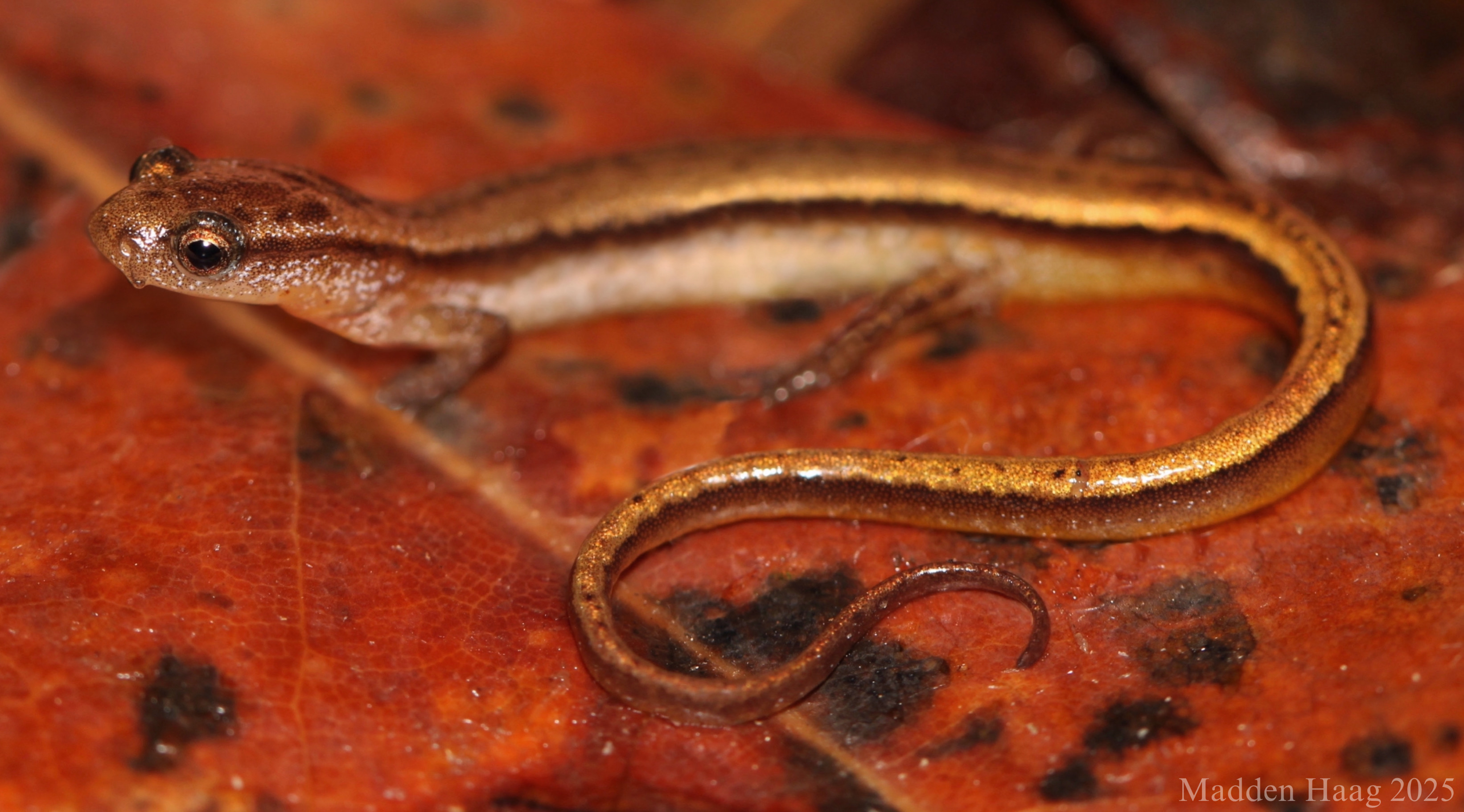

Conservation status
- Least Concern (IUCN 3.1)

- Apparently Secure (NatureServe)

Scientific classification
- Kingdom: Animalia
- Phylum: Chordata
- Class: Amphibia
- Order: Urodela
- Family: Plethodontidae
- Genus: Eurycea
- Species: E. chamberlaini

Binomial name
- Eurycea chamberlaini Harrison & Guttman, 2003

= Chamberlain's dwarf salamander =

Species of amphibian

Chamberlain's dwarf salamander (Eurycea chamberlaini) is a species of salamander in the family Plethodontidae, endemic to the United States. It is only found in the states of North Carolina and South Carolina. It was previously thought to be a color morph of the southeastern dwarf salamander (Eurycea quadridigitata), but was described in 2003 as a distinct species based on distinct morphology and behavior. A 2017 study reaffirmed it as being a distinct species. It is estimated that E. chamberlaini diverged from E. quadridigitata anywhere from 27 to 15 million years ago.

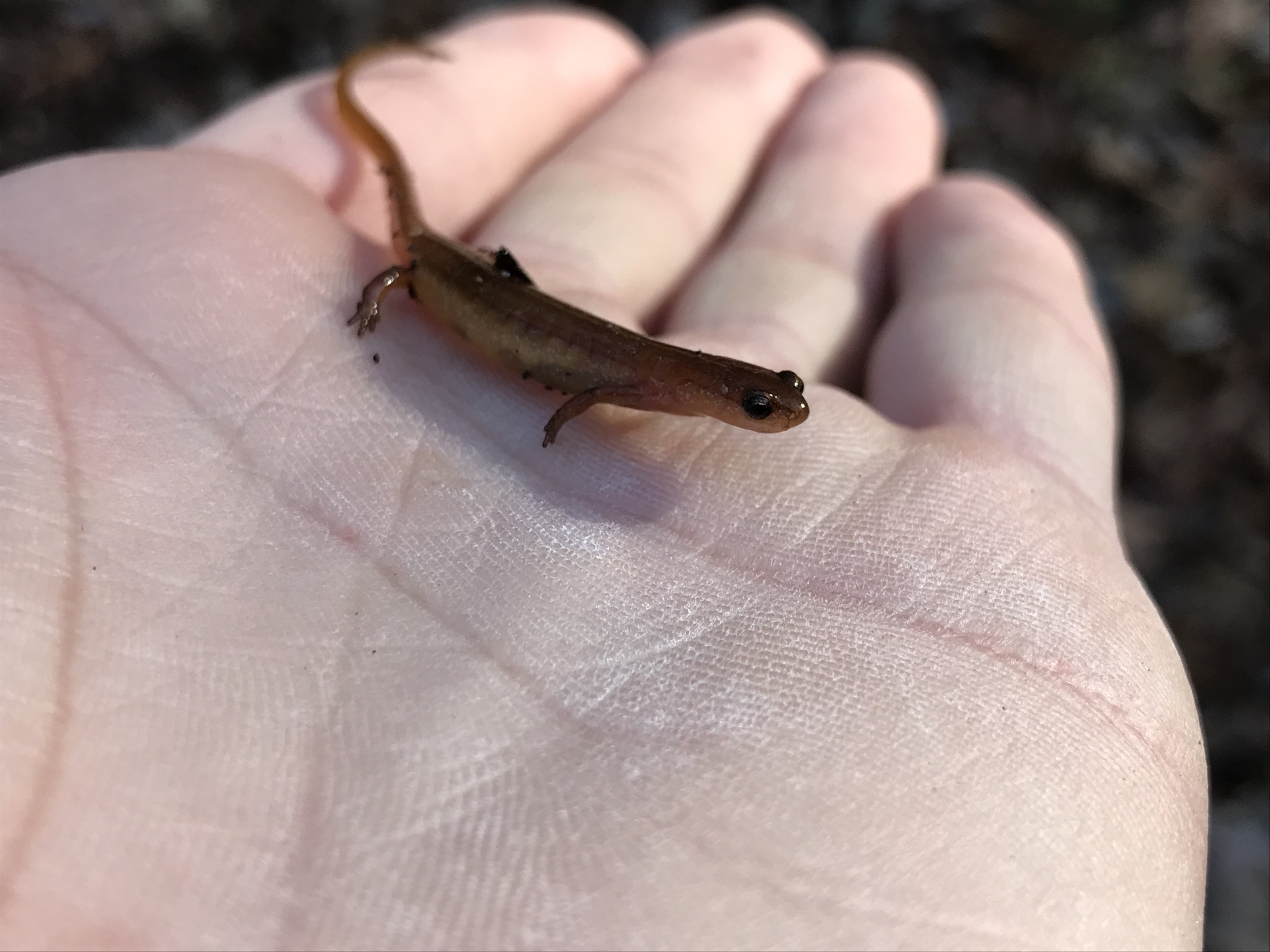
Chamberlain's dwarf salamander

The species is named for Edward Burnham Chamberlain, a former curator of the Vertebrate Zoology department at the Charleston Museum.

Eurycea chamberlaini currently is listed as a "State Species of Special Concern" in North Carolina. A 2021 IUCN study classified E. chamberlaini as a species of "least concern". Its small size and small habitat range have proved to make research on the species challenging. There is scant research available on the E. chamberlaini and other dwarf salamander species population but in recent years several studies have been conducted to further understanding of reproductive cycles and the species population.

== Description of species ==
Chamberlain's dwarf salamander is a very small species, averaging just 2.5 centimetres (1.0 in) in total length. E. chamberlaini is known to be a lighter brown color than E. quadridigitata (which it is commonly confused with) and has a yellowish underbelly with no spots. Other than E. quadridigitata, it is the only salamander of the genus Eurycea in North Carolina with four toes on each hind leg. E. chamberlaini has a yellowish brown stripe that runs down its dorsum (back) that is bordered by a black or brown stripe on either side. The tail is typically 50-60% of the adult's total length. E. chamberlaini is, on average, smaller than E. quadridigitata and can be distinguished from E. quadridigitata by looking at other features, such as its lighter coloration, yellow underside, and having only 16 coastal grooves. The females are typically larger than males. Overall, population structure of E. chamblerlaini appears similar to other coastal plain salamander species. For example, the mean snout–vent length of mature females and mature males was statistically different from one another with females tending to be larger than males.

== Habitat and ecology ==
Eurycea chamberlaini can be found in only North Carolina and South Carolina, specifically the Piedmonts of South Carolina and North Carolina, as well as the Upper Coastal Plain of South Carolina and the Central Coastal Plain of North Carolina. Its natural habitats are temperate forests, rivers, and freshwater marshes. Chamberlain's dwarf salamander can be found in lotic environments and prefers the areas around streams or seepage from springs and ponds. Some of the population can be found among lentic areas, such as floodplains, but for the most part they prefer lotic areas. E. chamberlaini and E. quadridigitata also tend to be found in separate parts of North Carolina, with E. chamberlaini frequenting the Southern part of the Coastal plains rather than the Southern plains. Records from North Carolina show E. chamberlaini being found in habitats like bottomland swamps and marshy areas, often being found among the leaf litter, within moss or under other cover objects. Considering E. chamberlaini is endemic to North Carolina, similar to other endemic species, E. chamberlaini is highly susceptible to human impacts such as habitat loss/encroachment and climate change.

== Diet ==
Chamberlain's Dwarf salamander has been recorded to eat other small invertebrates.

== Reproductive cycle ==
While still needing further research, recent studies have deepened the understanding of the reproductive cycle in E. chamberlaini. The reproductive season is October through April with the eggs being laid around winter time and hatching during spring. The males are considered "searching morphs" meaning they coerce the females using pheromones to mate with them. The males have lateral head courtship glands that are only present during the putative mating season. The lateral head courtship glands are only found in males, but both female and males have nasal glands, with the nasal glands found in the males being larger. Nasal glands are also responsible for pheromone production but it is still unclear if females also produce pheromones to attract males. During mating season males have elongated cirri and enlarged mental glands. Once eggs are laid they take around 30–40 days to hatch, with the larval period observed to be anywhere from 3–6 months. Some individuals even metamorphosed in just two months, which suggests that E. chamberlaini has an extremely short larval period. Hatchlings are a light-grayish brown with well-developed dorsal fins that stretch from the tail to the mid-body area. Larval salamanders have few spots that fade with age and are fully aquatic prior to metamorphosing.
