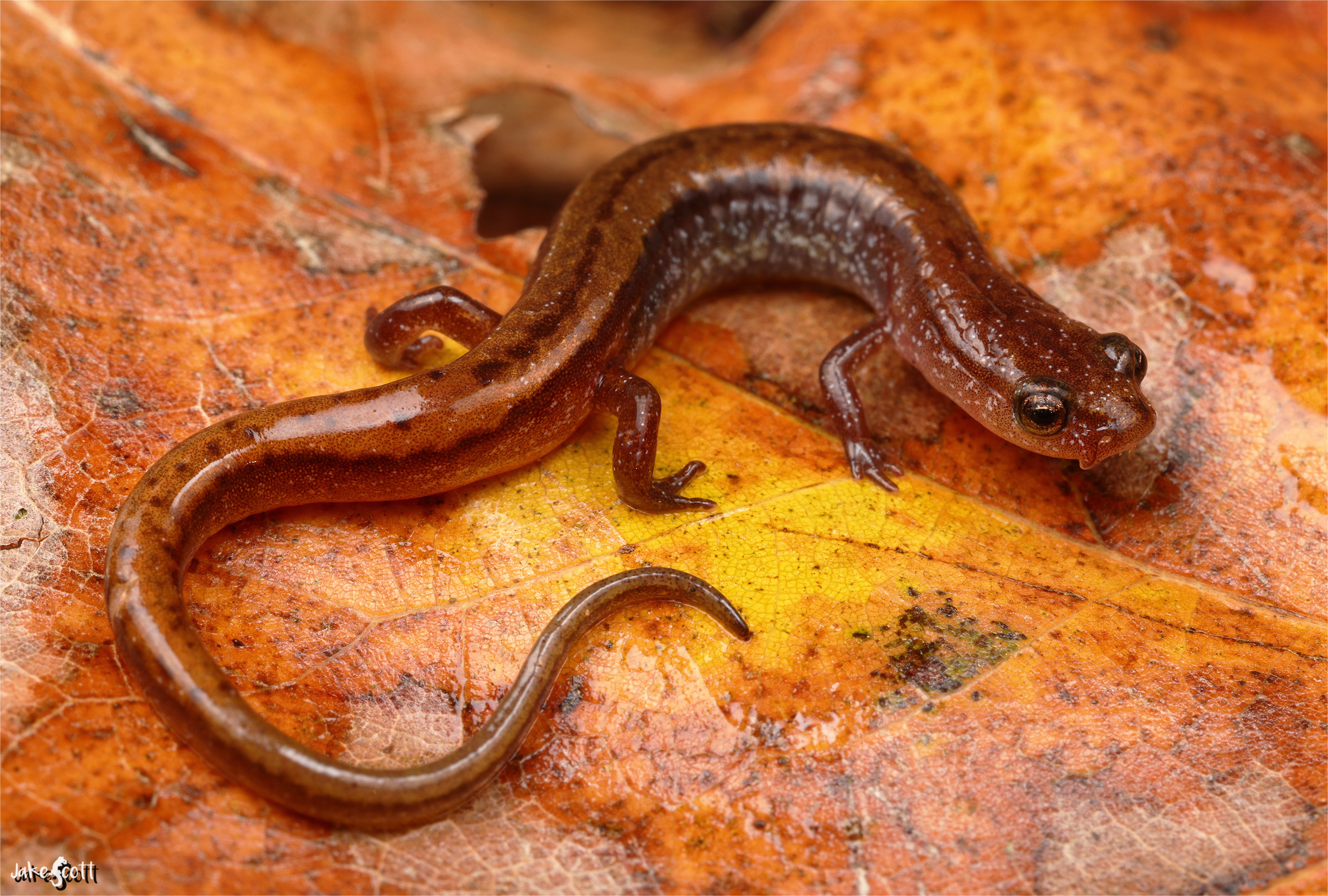

Conservation status
- Least Concern (IUCN 3.1)

- Secure (NatureServe)

Scientific classification
- Kingdom: Animalia
- Phylum: Chordata
- Class: Amphibia
- Order: Urodela
- Family: Plethodontidae
- Genus: Eurycea
- Species: E. paludicola

Binomial name
- Eurycea paludicola (Mittleman, 1947)

= Western dwarf salamander =

Species of amphibian

The western dwarf salamander (Eurycea paludicola) is species of salamander native to the southern United States.

== Taxonomy ==
It was described in 1947 but later synonymized with the southeastern dwarf salamander (Eurycea quadridigitata). However, a 2017 study used . In addition, genetic studies indicate that it may be more closely related to the radiation of neotenic Eurycea of the Edwards Plateau in Texas than to the rest of the E. quadridigitata complex.

== Distribution ==
It ranges from southern Mississippi east through Louisiana to eastern Texas.
