= List of Louisiana Wildlife Management Areas =

Wildlife Management Areas, Widlife Refuges, and Conservation Areas in Louisiana

Louisiana Wildlife Management Areas are protected conservation areas within the state of Louisiana. The goal is protecting, conserving, and replenishing wildlife, including all aquatic life. Wildlife Management Areas may be owned or managed by the Louisiana Department of Wildlife and Fisheries. The Enforcement Division ensures compliance of laws and rules and regulations regarding the management, conservation, protection of natural wildlife and fisheries resources, and providing public safety.

== Ecoregions ==
Louisiana is divided into areas called ecoregions, West Gulf Coast Plain (WGCP) with 370,861 acres, East Gulf Coast Plain (EGCP) with 198,377 acres, Mississippi Alluvial Valley - North (MAVN) with 128,736 acres, and the Mississippi Alluvial Valley - South (MAVS) with 257,999 acres.

== Wildlife Management Areas ==
Louisiana Wildlife Management Areas:

Name	Parish or Parishes	Acres	Owner
Acadiana Conservation Corridor Wildlife Management Area	Avoyelles, Evangeline, Rapides, St. Landry	2,285	Louisiana Department of Wildlife and Fisheries
Alexander State Forest	Rapides	8,158	State of Louisiana
Atchafalaya Delta Wildlife Management Area	St. Mary	137,695	U.S. Fish and Wildlife Service (USFWS), LDWF, and the U.S. Army Corps of Engineers (USACOE)
Attakapas Wildlife Management Area	Iberia Parish, St. Martin, St. Mary	27,962	State of Louisiana, United States Army Corps of Engineers
Bayou Macon Wildlife Management Area	East Carroll	6,919	Louisiana Department of Wildlife and Fisheries
Bayou Pierre Wildlife Management Area	DeSoto, Red River	2,799	Louisiana Department of Wildlife and Fisheries
Ben Lilly Conservation Area	Morehouse	247	State of Louisiana; managed by the Louisiana Department of Wildlife and Fisheries (LDWF)
Big Colewa Bayou Wildlife Management Area	West Carroll	1,798	Louisiana Department of Wildlife and Fisheries
Big Lake Wildlife Management Area	Franklin, Madison, Tensas	19,231	Louisiana Department of Wildlife and Fisheries
Biloxi Wildlife Management Area	St. Bernard	35,644	Biloxi Marsh Land Corporation
Bodcau Wildlife Management Area	Bossier and Webster	33,766	U. S. Army Corps of Engineers and a private corporate landowner
Boeuf Wildlife Management Area	Caldwell, Catahoula	51,110	Louisiana Department of Wildlife and Fisheries
Buckhorn Wildlife Management Area	Tensas Parish	11,121	Louisiana Department of Wildlife and Fisheries
Catahoula Lake Wildlife Management Area	La Salle	29440	State of Louisiana
Bussey Brake Wildlife Management Area	Morehouse	2,600	Louisiana Department of Wildlife and Fisheries
Clear Creek Wildlife Management Area (former Boise-Vernon WMA)	Vernon	52,559	Boise Cascade sold to Forest Capital Partners, LLC., then sold to Molpus Woodlands Group and The Hancock Timber Resource Group
Dewey W. Wills Wildlife Management Area (former Saline WMA)	Catahoula, LaSalle, Rapides	63,984	Louisiana Department of Wildlife and Fisheries, LaSalle Parish School Board, and the U.S. Army Corps of Engineers
Elbow Slough Wildlife Management Area	Rapides	160	Louisiana Department of Wildlife and Fisheries
Elm Hall Wildlife Management Area	Assumption	2,839	Louisiana Department of Wildlife and Fisheries
Esler Field Wildlife Management Area	Rapides, Grant	12,500	Louisiana National Guard
Floy Ward McElroy Wildlife Management Area	Richland	681	Louisiana Department of Wildlife and Fisheries
Fort Johnson North Wildlife Management Area (formerly Peason Ridge WMA)	Sabine and Natchitoches	74,309	U.S. Army
Fort Johnson-Vernon Wildlife Management Area	Vernon Parish	105,545	U.S. Army and U.S. Forest Service
Grassy Lake Wildlife Management Area	Avoyelles Parish	12,983	Louisiana Department of Wildlife and Fisheries
Hutchinson Creek Wildlife Management Area	St. Helena	129	Louisiana Department of Wildlife and Fisheries
J. C. "Sonny" Gilbert Wildlife Management Area (former Sicily Island Hills WMA)	Catahoula Parish	7,524	Louisiana Department of Wildlife and Fisheries:
John Franks Wildlife Management Area	Caddo	3,664	U.S. Army Corps of Engineers
Joyce Wildlife Management Area	Tangipahoa	42,292	Louisiana Department of Wildlife and Fisheries, Joyce Foundation (851 acres), and Tangipahoa School Board (484 acres)
Lake Boeuf Wildlife Management Area	Lafourche	800	Department of Wildlife and Fisheries
Lake Ramsay Savannah Wildlife Management Area	St. Tammany	796	Louisiana Department of Wildlife and Fisheries
Little River Wildlife Management Area	Grant, LaSalle, and Rapides	6,045	Resource Management Service, LLC and LDWF (4,164), LDWF and U.S. Army Corps of Engineers (5951)
Loggy Bayou Wildlife Management Area	Bossier	6,558	Louisiana Department of Wildlife & Fisheries, U.S. Army Corps of Engineers
Manchac Wildlife Management Area	St. John the Baptist	8,328	Louisiana Department of Wildlife and Fisheries
Marsh Bayou Wildlife Management Area	Evangeline	655	Louisiana Department of Wildlife and Fisheries
Maurepas Swamp Wildlife Management Area	Ascension, Livingston, St. John the Baptist, St. James and Tangipahoa	112,615	Louisiana Department of Wildlife and Fisheries
Pass a Loutre Wildlife Management Area	Plaquemines	115,000	Louisiana Department of Wildlife and Fisheries
Pearl River Wildlife Management Area	St. Tammany	35,619	Louisiana Department of Wildlife and Fisheries
Peason Ridge Wildlife Management Area	See: Fort Johnson North Wildlife Management		
Pointe-aux-Chenes Wildlife Management Area	Terrebonne and Lafourche	33,488	Louisiana Department of Wildlife and Fisheries
Pomme de Terre Wildlife Management Area	Avoyelles	6,434	Louisiana Department of Wildlife and Fisheries
Richard K. Yancey Wildlife Management Area (former Red River/Three Rivers WMA)	Concordia	70,872	Louisiana Department of Wildlife & Fisheries, U.S. Army Corps of Engineers
Russell Sage Wildlife Management Area	Morehouse, Ouachita and Richland	38,213	Louisiana Department of Wildlife & Fisheries
Sabine Island Wildlife Management Area	Calcasieu	8,343	State of Louisiana and Calcasieu Parish Schools
Sabine Wildlife Management Area	Sabine	7,571	Forest Capital Partners, LLC, et al
Salvador\/Timken Wildlife Management Area	St. Charles	34,520	Louisiana Department of Wildlife and Fisheries (Salvador); City Park Commission of New Orleans (Timken)
Sandy Hollow Wildlife Management Area	Tangipahoa Parish	4,655	Department of Wildlife and Fisheries (3,514 acres) and Tangipahoa Parish School Board (181 acres)
Sherburne Complex Wildlife Management Area	Pointe Coupee, St. Martin, and Iberville	43,637	LDWF, USFWS, and USACOE
Soda Lake Wildlife Management Area	Caddo	2,500	Caddo Levee District, USACOE
Spring Bayou Wildlife Management Area	Avoyelles	12,506	Louisiana Department of Wildlife and Fisheries
Tangipahoa Parish School Board Wildlife Management Area	Tangipahoa	1,643	Louisiana Department of Wildlife and Fisheries (Free Lease)
Thistlethwaite Wildlife Management Area	St. Landry	11,100	Thistlethwaite Heirs
Tunica Hills Wildlife Management Area	West Feliciana	6,503	Louisiana Department of Wildlife and Fisheries
Walnut Hill Wildlife Management Area	Vernon	595	Louisiana Department of Wildlife and Fisheries
West Bay Wildlife Management Area	Allen	59,189	Hancock Timber, Roy O. Martin, Forest Investment
White Lake Wetlands Conservation Area	Vermilion	71,905	Louisiana Department of Wildlife and Fisheries

== Former WMA ==
The LDWF free-lease on the more than 25,000-acre Jackson - Bienville Wildlife Management Area (a WMA since 1961) was not renewed as of July 1, 2016, as an agreement with the Weyerhaeuser Company could not be reached. Nesting areas of the Red-cockaded woodpeckers are still subject to protection by the State of Louisiana and the LDWF under current laws and rules and regulations.

Ben's Creek Wildlife Management Area in Washington Parish, with 13,044-acres (since 1987), was removed as a free-lease so the public can no longer use the property.

=== Georgia Pacific WMA ===
A 25,480-acre tract of land, bordered on the west by the Upper Ouachita National Wildlife Refuge, managed by the LDWF under a twenty-five year lease with tax exemptions that started in 1994, was removed as a WMA in 2003. The property, previously known as Terzia Game Preserve, under cooperative agreements with the state of Louisiana since 1935, was renamed Georgia Pacific WMA in 1966. Georgia Pacific Corporation transferred the property to a subsidy, The Timber Company, and the property was acquired by Plum Creek Timber Company during a 2001 merger. A local attorney brought a lawsuit in 2002 challenging the legality of a 1987 Legislative act (LSA-R.S. 56:24), that exempted local and state property taxes on corporate forest lands leased to the State for hunting by the public, that allegedly conflicts with Section 21 of Article 7 of the Louisiana Constitution. The lawsuit will likely have far reaching implications on land made available to the public that includes over 400,000 acres in Louisiana. With the potential loss of tax exemptions more property owners will likely not renew leases and many will opt to self-manage property pursuing other uses like leasing to hunting clubs, that have become a lucrative deal.

== Conservation areas ==
White Lake Wetlands Conservation Area in Vermilion Parish

== Wildlife refuges ==
Name	Parish or Parishes	Acres	Owner
Elmer's Island Refuge	Jefferson Parish	1,145	State of Louisiana: Managed by the LDWF
Isle Dernieres Barrier Islands Refuge	Terrebonne Parish: Wine, Trinity/East, Whiskey, and Raccoon Islands	1,900	State of Louisiana
Marsh Island Wildlife Refuge	Iberia Parish	76,664 (now 71,000)	LDWF
Queen Bess Island Wildlife Refuge	Jefferson	37	Louisiana Department of Wildlife and Fisheries
Rockefeller Wildlife Refuge	Cameron Parish, Vermilion Parish	71,000	State of Louisiana
St. Tammany Wildlife Refuge	St. Tammany Parish	1,310	Owned by LDWF; cooperatively managed by LDWF and the U.S. Fish and Wildlife Service
State Wildlife Refuge	Vermilion	13,000	LDWF
Waddill Wildlife Refuge and Outdoor Education Center	East Baton Rouge Parish	250	LDWF
