= Buckhorn Wildlife Management Area =

Protected area in Tensas Parish, Louisiana

- Interactive map of Buckhorn Wildlife Management Area
- Nearest city: Avondale, Louisiana
- Coordinates: 32°03′N 91°24′W
- Area: 4,500.5 ha (17.377 sq mi)
- Owner: Louisiana Department of Wildlife and Fisheries

Buckhorn Wildlife Management Area (WMA), an 11,121 acres (4,501 ha) tract of protected area located in Tensas Parish, in the state of Louisiana. The WMA is owned by the Louisiana Department of Wildlife and Fisheries (LDWF).

== Location ==
The WMA is approximately 14 miles (23 km) northwest of the parish seat of St. Joseph, north of the junction of Louisiana Highway 128 (LA 128) and Louisiana Highway 573 (LA 573), and south of Louisiana Highway 4, in the unincorporated community of Newellton, Louisiana. The unincorporated communities of Ashland, Mayflower, and Maryland are south of the WMA.

== Waterways ==
There are six small lakes and six bayous in the WMA with approximately 13 miles (21 km) of waterways. Lake Marydale gives access to the Tensas River through Turkey Lake, Hopaka Lake, and Bieler Bayou. There is access to the oxbow Lake Bruin via Routh Bayou, Clark Bayou, and Routh Ditch. Tensas River National Wildlife Refuge and Big Lake State Wildlife Management Area are to the north.

== Flora ==
The overstory includes willows, Nuttall oak tree (Quercus texana), overcup oak tree (Quercus lyrata), water oak (Quercus nigra), sweet gum, green ash (Fraxinus pennsylvanica), persimmon, sugarberry (Celtis laevigata), honey locust (Gleditsia triacanthos), sweet pecan (Carya illinoinensis), bitter pecan, elm, cypress, and tupelo gum (Nyssa aquatica). The understory includes palmetto, river cane, buttonbush, and swamp dogwood. Herbaceous plants include poison ivy, deciduous holly, Smilax, and Baccharis.

== Fauna ==
Black bears (Ursus americanus) are present in the WMA. Among the species of birds are the eastern phoebe, white-throated sparrow, northern flicker, black-and-white warbler, orange-crowned warbler, palm warbler, yellow-rumped warbler, yellow-bellied sapsucker, northern flicker, swamp sparrow, and the song sparrow. The prothonotary warblers, Swainson's warbler, and American redstart are considered nesting warblers. There are also waterfowl, wading birds, and shorebirds. Pectoral sandpiper, great blue heron, little blue heron, green heron, great egrets, snowy egrets, cattle egret, white ibis, belted kingfisher. Northern rough-winged swallows, tree swallows, barn swallows, and cliff swallows can be seen.

== See also ==
List of Louisiana Wildlife Management Areas
