= Spring Bayou Wildlife Management Area =

American wildlife preserve

- IUCN category IV (habitat/species management area)
- Location within Louisiana
- Location: Avoyelles Parish, Louisiana
- Nearest city: Marksville, Louisiana
- Coordinates: 31°7′12″N 92°1′42″W
- Area: 12,506 acres (5,061 ha)
- Governing body: Louisiana Department of Wildlife and Fisheries, U.S. Fish and Wildlife Service, U.S. Army Corps of Engineers
- Website: Sherburne Complex Wildlife Management Area

Spring Bayou Wildlife Management Area, also referred to as Spring Bayou WMA or Spring Bayou State Wildlife Management Area, is a 12,506 acres (5,061 ha) protected area in Avoyelles Parish, Louisiana.

The WMA is part of the more than 13,000 acres (5,300 ha) Spring Bayou Complex. Over the years the waterways have become silted in and overrun with invasive water plants. Ultimately a restoration project was implemented that involved the city of Marksville, concerned citizens, the Louisiana Legislature, the United States Army Corps of Engineers, Spring Bayou, as part of the Atchafalaya National Heritage Area runs through the WMA.

== Spring Bayou WMA ==
Spring Bayou WMA includes Grand Lake, Grand Coulee, Coulee Noir, Lac aux Siene (), Lac a Deux Boute, Lac Tete de Bouef, Lake Francois, Lake Gabriel, Petite Bay, Old River, Bayou de la Bay, Central Slough and some of Cocodrie Bayou. The Atchafalaya National Heritage Trail runs through the WMA.

== Ecosystem condition ==
The aquatic invasive species of Giant salvinia, Cuban bulrush and hydrilla had long taken over a vast majority of the backwater areas. Aggradation caused the watershed to become impounded requiring ecological restoration. The LDWF was preparing to implement a drawdown as a means of vegetation control. Local citizens did not think this a total viable solution since most of the area required Go-Devil (Gator-Tail, other mud boats, or airboats) to gain access.

The Avoyelles Parish Police jury began a petition and collected names to bring attention to and solve problems. This led to the creation of the Spring Bayou master plan being adopted.

The beginning of the restoration started on 24 March 1998 (Docket 3549), when a study was authorized by resolution adopted by the Committee on Transportation and Infrastructure of the House of Representatives. The study, "Spring Bayou, Louisiana Ecosystem Restoration Project Feasibility Report and Environmental Impact Statement" laid in motion an extensive restoration by the United States Army Corps of Engineers. In 2007 the Spring Bayou Restoration Team was formed. Among other things 62,000 triploid (sterile) grass carp were introduced in November 2013, and the war on hydrilla began. In 2016 victory was proclaimed.

== Spring Bayou Complex ==
The WMA is located within the nearly 13,000 acres (5,300 ha) Spring Bayou Complex that is an ecological system that extends from the Marksville area to Bordelonville, Louisiana. Forty percent of the land is covered in bayous, sloughs, ox-bows, lakes, and swamps. Waterways outside the Spring Bayou WMA are Little River, Lake Grand Bayou, Bae Sec, and Cocodrie. Land owners include private individuals, farmers, timber companies and the state of Louisiana, that owns the WMA.

The Marksville State Historic Site includes the Indian mounds, near Old River, of the defunct Avoyel, or Avoyelles Tribe. The site is in a Louisiana state park but is in a state of deterioration. The mounds are included in the National Register of Historic Places. Spring Bayou, as part of the Atchafalaya National Heritage Area, runs through the complex and WMA.

== Wildlife ==
Spring Bayou is home to several rare and endangered species including the Louisiana pine snake, Red-cockaded woodpecker, Northern long-eared bat (possible, not sighted), Pallid sturgeon, and Alligator Snapping Turtles

=== Fauna ===
There are Louisiana black bear, deer, ducks, alligators, largemouth bass, and catfish.

==== Birds ====
There are a large number of birds including the Common gallinule, Black-necked stilt, Anhinga, Double-crested cormorants (Nannopterum auritum), and Neotropic cormorants. Yellow-bellied Sapsucker (Sphyrapicus varius), Northern Flicker (Colaptes auratus), Swamp Sparrow (Melospiza georgiana), White-faced Ibis (Plegadis chihi), Common Yellowthroat (Geothlypis trichas), Ring-necked Duck (Aythya collaris), Eastern Phoebe (Sayornis phoebe), Hermit Thrush (Catharus guttatus), White-throated Sparrow (Zonotrichia albicollis), Orange-crowned Warbler (Leiothlypis celata), Tree Swallow (Tachycineta bicolor), Golden-crowned Kinglet (Regulus satrapa), Eastern Kingbird (Tyrannus tyrannus), Common Gallinule (Gallinula galeata), Yellow-billed Cuckoo (Coccyzus americanus), Black-necked Stilt (Himantopus mexicanus), Neotropic Cormorant (Nannopterum brasilianum) Tricolored Heron (Egretta tricolor), Red-shouldered Hawk (Buteo lineatus), Acadian Flycatcher (Empidonax virescens), Yellow-throated Vireo (Vireo flavifrons), Cliff Swallow (Petrochelidon pyrrhonota), Brown Thrasher (Toxostoma rufum), Orchard Oriole (Icterus spurius), Summer Tanager (Piranga rubra), Painted Bunting (Passerina ciris), Blue-headed Vireo (Vireo solitarius), American Robin (Turdus migratorius), White Ibis (Eudocimus albus), Dark-eyed Junco (Junco hyemalis), and around 56 more.

=== Flora ===
The forests are bottomland hardwood that includes nuttall oak and overcup oak with bitter pecan on the ridges. From lower elevations into the waters are overcup oak, bitter pecan, swamp privet, and buttonbush. Lake edges are fringed with cypress, Willow, and Buttonbush. The understory consists of deciduous holly, Green hawthorn, dogwood, and seedlings of the overstory. Other plants include rattan, greenbrier, peppervine, trumpet creeper, dewberry, smartweed, verbena, wild lettuce, vetch, sedges, and grasses. Aquatic species include water hyacinth, alligator weed, delta duck potato, Water primrose, Lotus, and duckweed.

== Other management areas ==
Other management areas in the parish include Lake Ophelia NWR, Grand Cote NWR, Grassy Lake WMA and Pomme de Terre WMA areas.

== See also ==
- List of Louisiana Wildlife Management Areas
- Tonetta Lake
- Marksville, Louisiana
