= Grassy Lake Wildlife Management Area =

Protected area in Louisiana, United States

- Grassy Lake WMA
- IUCN category V (protected landscape/seascape)
- Location within Louisiana
- Location: Avoyelles and Parish, Louisiana
- Nearest city: Bordelonville, Louisiana
- Coordinates: 31°8′0″N 91°45′45″W.
- Area: 12,983 acres (52.54 km^{2})
- Governing body: Louisiana Department of Wildlife and Fisheries

Grassy Lake WMA

Grassy Lake Wildlife Management Area, also referred to as Grassy Lake WMA, is a 12,983 acres (5,254 ha) protected area located in northern Avoyelles Parish, Louisiana, with limited land access and water access from the Red River.

== Location ==
Grassy Lake WMA is located east of Bordelonville, Louisiana. Lake Ophelia National Wildlife Refuge is to the northwest, and the Red River borders the east side with the Richard K. Yancey Wildlife Management Area (Red River/Three Rivers WMA) on the west bank of the river.

The only main road access is from LA 451, that crosses LA 1 at Moreauville, circles Pomme de Terre Wildlife Management Area (that is west of the southern portion of Grassy Lake WMA), and re-enters LA 1 at a junction with LA-114 west of Hamburg. The main road access from LA 451 crosses the levee at the Bayou des Glaises flood control structure (floodgate crossing), following Bayou Natchitoches road across the northern portion of the WMA, and ends at Smith Bay on the east side at the Red River. Access can also be made from LA 451, at the Monroe Fabre Crossing, and following Bayou Des Sot road. This road intersects Highline road that follows the banks of the Red River north to Smith Bay and connects to the Bayou Natchitoches road.

== Description ==
Grassy Lake WMA is flat and poorly drained area of land situated in the Red River alluvial floodplain of the Red River Valley. The area is at the bottom of the Red River Alluvial Aquifer and Upland Terrace Aquifer, where it meets the Mississippi River Alluvial Aquifer at the southern end of the Mississippi Alluvial Plain around the junction with the northern point of the Mississippi River Delta. The ground water is hard to very hard requiring treatment for potability.

== Flora ==
The WMA has four main water bodies, Smith Bay, Grassy Lake, Lake Chenier, and Red River Bay. Bayou Natchitoches traverses the area that supports an over-cover of bottomland hardwood such as willow, cypress, bitter pecan, swampprivet, water elm, overcup oak, cottonwood, sycamore, honey locust, and hackberry. The understory vegetation is typical of the poorly drained land and includes buttonbush, deciduous holly, smilax, dewberry, rattan, peppervine, as well as annual grasses and sedges.

== Fauna ==
Grassy Lake WMA has swamp rabbits, deer, squirrels, wild turkey, woodcock, waterfowl, largemouth bass, crappie, bream, and alligators

== 2018 flood ==
The WMA was closed during the March 2018 flooding that included the closing of fourteen roads in the Richard K. Yancey Wildlife Management Area in Concordia Parish, and reopened in March.

== See also ==
- List of Louisiana Wildlife Management Areas
