= Boeuf Wildlife Management Area =

Protected area in northeast Louisiana, US

- Boeuf WMA
- Location within Louisiana
- Location: Caldwell and Catahoula Parishes, Louisiana
- Nearest city: Winnsboro, Louisiana
- Coordinates: 32°03′01″N 91°56′30″W
- Area: 51,110 acres (206.8 km^{2})
- Governing body: Louisiana Department of Wildlife and Fisheries
- Website: www.wlf.louisiana.gov/page/boeuf

Boeuf WMA

The Boeuf Wildlife Management Area is 51,110-acre (20,680 ha) parcel of bottomland hardwoods, cypress-tupelo swamp (cypress dome), and other wetland habitats in northeast Louisiana. It is owned by the Louisiana Department of Wildlife and Fisheries. Boeuf Wildlife Management Area is located in Caldwell and Catahoula Parishes, near the city of Columbia, Louisiana.

The forest overstory is a relatively closed stand of mixed bottomland hardwoods. On higher elevations the predominant tree species are willow oak, water oak, Nuttall’s oak, rock elm, sweetgum, and persimmon.

Important species in the lower elevations are overcup oak, bitter pecan, and honey locust, with cypress and tupelo gum being found in sloughs and old lakes. Understory species commonly found on Boeuf WMA include deciduous holly, hawthorn, swamp privet, rattan, greenbriar and grape. Boeuf has a greentree reservoir and several moist soil impoundments available for waterfowl and other wetland species.

== Birding opportunities ==
Boeuf WMA is under consideration for the America's Wetland Foundation Red River Birding Trail and Mississippi River Birding Trail.

== See also ==
List of Louisiana Wildlife Management Areas
