= Attakapas Wildlife Management Area =

Protected area in Louisiana, US

- Attakapas Island Wildlife Management Area
- IUCN category V (protected landscape/seascape)
- Location within Louisiana
- Location: St. Mary, St. Martin, and Iberia Parishes, Louisiana
- Coordinates: 29°56′34″N 91°27′46″W
- Area: 27,962 acres (113.16 km^{2})
- Established: 1976
- Governing body: State of Louisiana through the Louisiana Department of Wildlife and Fisheries

Attakapas Island WMA

Attakapas Wildlife Management Area, also known as Attakapas Island Wildlife Management Area, is a 27,962-acre tract of protected area located in St. Mary, St. Martin, and Iberia Parishes, Louisiana. The property was acquired in 1976 by the state of Louisiana.

The WMA is only accessible by water, usually by boat or kayak. There is primitive camping with three picnic tables. The fauna includes Louisiana black bear, alligators, deer, and smaller animals.

== Fauna ==
Fishing has been considered excellent for the Largemouth bass, Crappie, Catfish, Bream, Bluegill, Gar, Bowfin (Choupique), Freshwater drum, and recreational crawfishing. There is hunting for deer, and with the proper licenses, the Louisiana black bear and alligators. Although not in the top five of duck yields, 1,510 ducks were harvested, with 2.5 ducks per hunter effort. Hurricane Francine did not cause much damage to the WMA.

== Description ==
The WMA is located NNE of Jeanerette and Charenton, east of the west Atchafalaya Basin Spillway levee. The Atchafalaya River runs almost through the middle. The WMA is actually located on several islands, with Bayou Chene on the west and West Grand Lake and East Grand Lake on the east. The northern boundary is the Texaco pipeline, and the southern boundary is a three-prong point with West Grand Lake on the west side, Thibodaux Chute in the center (above Cypress Island), and an area south of Blue Point (and Blue Point Chute) east of Tiger Island known as Willow Cove. The 27,962 acres (11,316 ha) tract is owned by the state of Louisiana and is under the authority of the Louisiana Department of Wildlife and Fisheries (LDWF), totaling 25,730 acres (10,410 ha), and 2,232 acres (903 ha) is owned by the US Army Corps of Engineers.

Destination points of hunters and fishermen on the west side of the Atchafalaya are Mud Cove (Iberia Parish), Rogers Cove, Miller Chute, Crew Boat Chute, Raymonds Cove, Goat Island, Louisiana, Myette Pointe, and San Diego Cut, in St. Mary Parish, along with part of Grassy Lake, which is on the east side of the river. There is a tract of land east of the Atchafalaya opposite Mud Cove in Iberia Parish, and south of that is Schwing Cove, Schwing Chute, and an Exxon pipeline runs diagonally east to west through the area that is in St. Martin Parish. Union Oil #1 and #2 are both located south of Grassy Lake.

== Restoration ==
In 1999, Hunt Oil installed a water control structure with some minor levee repairs when extending the Crew Boat Chute. The improvements will increase moist-soil production with favorable water levels for early migratory waterfowl as well as wintering waterfowl.

== Dredging ==
In October 2012, a month-long job was implemented to restore the sediment trap at Dog Leg Canal to working condition and improve freshwater inflow into the WMA. The work was approved by the Atchafalaya Basin Technical Advisory Group and funded by the Louisiana Department of Natural Resources.

== See also ==
- List of Louisiana Wildlife Management Areas
