= Richard K. Yancey Wildlife Management Area =

Protected area in Louisiana, United States

- Red River/Three Rivers Wildlife Management Area
- IUCN category V (protected landscape/seascape)
- Location within Louisiana
- Location: Concordia Parish, Louisiana
- Coordinates: 31°7′32″N 91°41′3″W
- Area: 70,872 acres (286.81 km^{2})
- Governing body: Louisiana Department of Wildlife and Fisheries and U.S. Army Corps of Engineers
- Website: www.wlf.louisiana.gov/page/richard-k-yancey

Richard K. Yancey WMA

The Richard K. Yancey Wildlife Management Area, formerly the Red River/Three Rivers Wildlife Management Area, is a 70,872-acre (28,681 ha) tract of protected area in lower Concordia Parish, Louisiana. The area is owned by the Louisiana Department of Wildlife and Fisheries and the U.S. Army Corps of Engineers (USACOE). The WMA is located off LA 15 approximately 35 miles (56 km) south of Ferriday between the Red River and the Mississippi River.

== Description ==
The WMA consists of a mixture of bottomland hardwood trees that includes bitter pecan, overcup oak, nuttall oak, bald cypress, sweet pecan tree, honey locust, hackberry, sycamore, green ash, cottonwood tree (Populus heterophylla or possibly Populus heterophylla), and willow trees. The land is flat and poorly drained, including swampland, with many lakes and bayous. Wildlife includes deer, turkey, squirrel, rabbit, waterfowl, woodcock, dove, and snipe. Furbearers are the raccoon, mink, nutria, beaver, bobcat, fox, otter, and coyote. There is an annual public alligator lottery and fishing includes bass, bluegill, crappie, and catfish. Commercial fishing offers buffalo (considered a rough fish to anglers), carp (also a rough fish), drum (fish), gar, bowfin, and catfish.

== History ==
Three Rivers Wildlife Management Area consisted of 26,295 acres owned by the LDWF and 1,085 acres owned by the USACOE totaling 27,380 acres before the merge.

=== Merge and name change ===
Richard K. Yancey (1925–2013) worked for the Louisiana Department of Wildlife and Fisheries from 1948 to 1979. After being promoted to assistant secretary of the Office of Wildlife he was active in creating the Tensas River National Wildlife Refuge and Big Lake Wildlife Management Area. "Dick" Yancey was referred to as the "great duck man" and made a video sponsored by Ducks Unlimited supporting the Louisiana duck hunting season for 1965–1966 as well as the September teal season. The Bureau of Sport Fisheries and Wildlife was against extending the 1965–66 Teal season that Yancey pushed for, but it became a reality.

The LDWF commission unanimously passed a resolution to change the name of the consolidated WMA's to the current name.

== Current ==
After the consolidation, the WMA was increased to 57,004 acres owned by the LDWF and 12,802 acres owned by the USCOE for a total of 69,806 acres as of 2016. The 2016–2017 September Teal season (Blue-winged, Green-winged, and Cinnamon only) ran from September 10 to the 25th.

== See also ==
- List of Louisiana Wildlife Management Areas
