= West Bay Wildlife Management Area =

Protected area in Louisiana, United States

- West Bay WMA
- IUCN category V (protected landscape/seascape)
- Location within Louisiana
- Location: Allen Parish, Louisiana
- Coordinates: 30°47′48″N 92°47′52″W
- Area: 59,189 acres (239.53 km^{2})
- Established: 1948 (original)
- Governing body: Louisiana Department of Wildlife and Fisheries

West Bay WMA

West Bay Wildlife Management Area, also known as West Bay WMA, is a 59,189-acre tract of protected area near Elizabeth in Allen Parish, Louisiana. The WMA is managed by the Louisiana Department of Wildlife and Fisheries (LDWF) from land owned by Boise Paper Solutions, Roy O. Martin Lumber Company, Forest Investments Associates, and Weyerhaeuser.

== WMA land acquisition ==
The WMA is a partnership between Boise Paper Solutions (35,000 acres), Roy O. Martin Lumber Company (15,000 acres) signed on in March 2004, Forest Investments Associates (8,000 acres) and Weyerhaeuser (1,189 acres), and operates lease free to the LDWF.

== Location ==
West Bay is located predominantly south of Elizabeth with an area extending northeast, above town and north of LA 10, that borders the WMA to the east side. South River Road borders the east side south to Pine Chapel Road. From this point the boundary is irregular across the southern portion to an intersection and short boundary with LA 26 to the west side. With small deviations around the central west border and extreme northwest border Turner Road is the western boundary.

== Description ==
Approximately one-third of the 59,189 acres (23,953 ha) of the WMA is baygall habitat. Mill Creek runs through the WMA joined by Mab branch, Alligator Creek, Black Creek, and Little Mill Creek before exiting the WMA and the confluence with the Calcasieu River.

== Habitat ==
West Bay has a diverse habitat of animal and plant life.

=== Fauna ===
Game species include squirrel, rabbit, deer, dove, woodcock, and turkey.

=== Flora ===
Common hardwood species are water, white, red, willow, and cow oak along with blackgum, beech; and hickory trees. Overstory species include flowering dogwood, redbay, sweetleaf, and sweetgum. In the baygall areas, the understory species are yaupon, rattan, arrowwood, smilax, and deciduous holly. The understory in the pine plantations is primarily blackberry, dewberry, huckleberry, smilax.

== See also ==
- List of Louisiana Wildlife Management Areas
