= Manchac Wildlife Management Area =

Protected area in Louisiana, United States

- Manchac WMA
- IUCN category V (protected landscape/seascape)
- Interactive map of Manchac Wildlife Management Area
- Location: St. John the Baptist Parish, Louisiana
- Nearest city: Manchac (Akers)
- Coordinates: 30°15′54″N 90°21′48″W
- Area: 8,328 acres (33.70 km^{2})
- Established: 1975
- Governing body: Louisiana Department of Wildlife and Fisheries
- Website: www.wlf.louisiana.gov/page/Manchac

Manchac Wildlife Management Area, also referred to as Manchac WMA, is an 8,328-acre (3,370 ha) swampland and protected area in St. John the Baptist Parish, Louisiana. The WMA is managed by the Louisiana Department of Wildlife and Fisheries.

== Location ==
8,328 acres (over 11.48 square miles) was purchased from E.G. Schlieder in 1975. The WMA, swamp and marsh areas, lie south of Jones Island, Pass Manchac, and east of Interstate 55. The 42,292 acres (17,115 ha) Joyce Wildlife Management Area, to the north of North Pass and Pass Manchac, which is south of Ponchatoula, the 112,615 acres (45,574 ha) Maurepas Swamp Wildlife Management Area, south of the WMA, as well as Lake Borgne, Lake Pontchartrain, Lake Maurepas, and the WMA fall within the 1,700,000 acres (690,000 ha) Pontchartrain Basin.

== Description ==
The WMA is flat, low marshland mainly accessible by watercraft, and motorized craft are limited to certain areas. Bald cypress has been largely logged out of the area. The Prairie is a 500-acre shallow, freshwater pond near the shoreline of Lake Pontchartrain.

== Recreation ==
Recreation in the area includes canoeing, kayaking, bird watching, and fishing.

== Biodiversity ==
Wildlife in the WMA includes the spotted gar, bully mullet, American alligator, American gizzard shad, Gulf menhaden, channel catfish, black-bellied whistling duck, pied-billed grebe, great egret, and the common pondhawk. Other game are the scaup, mallard, teal, gadwall, widgeon, shoveler, coot, rail, and snipe. Bald eagles and ospreys have been observed on the WMA.

Plants in the area Spanish moss, bull tongue (the Acadian French name for pickerel weed is "langue du boeuf"), smartweed, alligator weed, and spartina. Submerged aquatic vegetation includes naiads, pondweeds, fanwort, and coontail. Cypress and tupelo lie along the Lake Pontchartrain boundary. The understory consists of black willow, maple, palmetto (dwarf palmetto), baccharis, and other grasses. Southeastern Louisiana University’s Turtle Cove Environmental Research Station is located on the WMA. There is also Roseau Cane, Switch Cane, cat-o'-nine-tails, daisy, dewberry, giant blue iris, Maidencane, and marsh mallow.

== See also ==
- Battle of Ponchatoula
