= Fort Johnson North Wildlife Management Area =

Protected area in Louisiana

- Fort Johnson North WMA
- IUCN category V (protected landscape/seascape)
- Location within Louisiana
- Location: Natchitoches, Sabine, and Vernon Parishes, Louisiana
- Nearest city: Hornbeck (town), Chopin (town), Natchitoches (small city)
- Coordinates: 31°22′35″N 93°15′05″W
- Area: 74,309 acres (300.72 km^{2})
- Governing body: Fort Johnson Department of Defense, U.S. Forest Service, managed by the Louisiana Department of Wildlife and Fisheries (LDWF)

Fort Johnson North Wildlife Management Area, known locally as Peason Ridge WMA, is a 74,309-acre tract of protected area located in the Parishes of Natchitoches, Sabine, and Vernon, in the state of Louisiana. The WMA is managed by the Louisiana Department of Wildlife and Fisheries (LDWF).

Part of Peason Ridge is also part of Kisatchie National Forest.

== Location ==
Fort Johnson North WMA is located 14 miles north of Leesville, that includes the communities of Bellwood, Gorum, and Mink, as well as the Longleaf Vista Recreational Area. LA 117 runs south to north through the WMA and LA 118 and LA 478 are also located within the WMA.

== Land ownership ==
According to a Louisiana Wildlife and Fisheries press release, "About half of Fort Polk and Peason Ridge is owned by the Department of Defense. The other half is owned by the U.S. Forest Service, which leases that half to the U.S. Army for training. LDWF leases both areas from the U.S. Army for both Peason Ridge and Fort Polk WMAs.".

=== WMA expansion ===
The Louisiana Wildlife and Fisheries Commission voted to add 23,300 acres to the WMA in 2016.

== Hunting and fishing ==
The WMA allows hunting with schedules set out by the LDWF. Cancellations can be announced without much notice, according to Fort Polk maneuvers scheduling, which can now be checked online. Violators of any hunting or fishing laws can be subject to state or federal charges.

== Habitat ==
=== Fauna ===
Game wildlife in the WMA include squirrel, rabbit, deer, quail, woodcock, dove, and turkey. Trapping is allowed for mink, fox, bobcat, raccoon, coyote, skunk, and opossum.

==== Red-cockaded woodpecker ====
The Red-cockaded woodpecker is the only endangered species in the WMA. A 2009 JRTC/Fort Polk draft listed 25,157 acres of current and potential Red-cockaded woodpecker habitat at Peason Ridge. A "Management intensity and population trends study" from 1998 to 2002 shows the population on Peason Ridge to be "stable" but considering the resources expended this was a cause of concern.

=== Flora ===
Trees and other flora include ridge trees of longleaf, loblolly, and shortleaf pine along with sand jack oak, also known as Bluejack Oak, Cinnamon Oak, or Upland Willow Oak in the other ten indigenous states where it is found. There is also red, blackjack, and post oak. Upland understory includes. myrtle, yaupon, sweetgum, dogwood, huckleberry, and sumac. Creek bottom overstory includes water oak, beech, magnolia, sweetgum, red maple, and ash trees. Understory species are dogwood, buttonbush, French mulberry, wild azalea, hazel alder, hawthorn, red and white bay, black gum, viburnum.

== See also ==
- List of Louisiana Wildlife Management Areas
