= Sabine Wildlife Management Area =

Protected area in Louisiana, US

- Sabine WMA
- IUCN category V (protected landscape/seascape)
- Location within Louisiana
- Location: Sabine Parish, Louisiana
- Nearest city: Zwolle
- Coordinates: 31°33′40″N 93°35′11″W:
- Area: 7,554 acres (30.57 km^{2})
- Governing body: Louisiana Department of Wildlife and Fisheries (lease), primary owner: Forest Capital Partners, LLC

Sabine Wildlife Management Area (WMA) is a protected area in Sabine Parish, Louisiana, covering 7,554 acres (3,057 ha). The WMA is located 5 miles (8.0 km) south of Zwolle, with access from Louisiana Highway 6 and US Highway 171. The WMA provides habitat for many species of animal and plant life, with primitive camping, hunting, fishing, photography, and birding. Wildlife management areas, except the Maurepas Swamp Wildlife Management Area are closed due to the government shutdown until further notice.

== Description ==
There are 7,554 acres with gentle rolling hills and creek bottoms. The majority of the land is owned by Forest Capital Partners, LLC, with small tracts owned by other timber companies and some private individuals.

=== Flora and fauna ===
The upland overstory consists of loblolly pine, red, post, and white oak, hickory, and sweetgum. The understory includes yaupon, French mulberry, hawthorn, sassafras, black cherry, wax myrtle, huckleberry, and dogwood. Along the creek bottoms, the overstory consists of beech, willow oak, water oak, and southern red oak; red maple; black and sweetgum; and magnolia, and an understory of ironwood, dogwood, wild azalea, and deciduous holly.

=== Hunting ===
Hunting is allowed for deer, squirrels, rabbits, waterfowl, quail, doves, and woodcock. Turkey may be hunted by lottery only. Trapping for mink, raccoon, opossum, skunk, fox, beaver, and coyote is allowed.
