= Pomme de Terre Wildlife Management Area =

Protected area in Louisiana, United States

- Pomme de Terre WMA
- IUCN category V (protected landscape/seascape)
- Location within Louisiana
- Location: Avoyelles Parish, Louisiana
- Nearest city: Bordelonville, Louisiana
- Coordinates: 31°3′20″N 91°50′40″W.
- Area: 6,434 acres (26.04 km^{2})
- Governing body: Louisiana Department of Wildlife and Fisheries (LDWF)

Pomme de Terre WMA

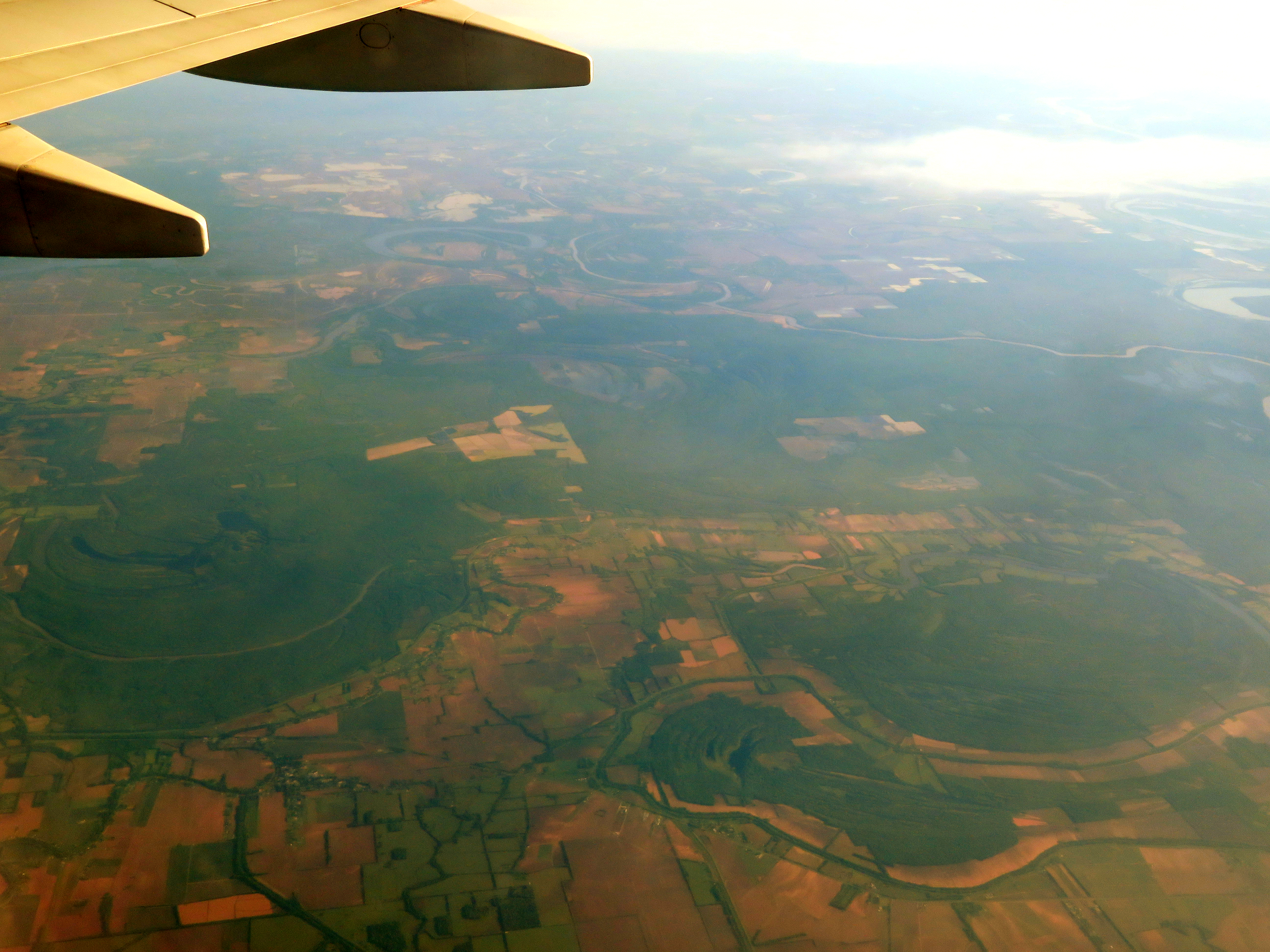
Pomme De Terre State Wildlife Management Area and Spring Bayou State Wildlife Management Area, Louisiana

Pomme de Terre Wildlife Management Area, also referred to as Pomme de Terre WMA, is a 6,434 acres (2,604 ha) protected area located in Avoyelles Parish, Louisiana, owned and managed by the Louisiana Department of Wildlife and Fisheries (LDWF).

== Location ==
Pomme de Terre WMA is located north of LA 1, Simmesport, and the communities of Red Fish and Yellow Bayou (site of the Battle of Yellow Bayou, with access from LA 451 through Hamburg. La 451 makes a semi-circle around the south, east, and north sides of the WMA with Pete Laborde road running north to south on the west side.

== Description ==
Pomme de Terre WMA comprises 6,434 acres (2,604 ha), of which around 60% are open water and marsh areas (Pomme de Terre swamp) containing water hyacinth, duckweed, lotus (the nuts are edible and the Cajuns call them "graine à voler"), cutgrass, and buttonbush. The ridges have bald cypress and the overstory consists of scattered Nuttall's oak and overcup oak. There are also hackberry, locust, elm, ash, maple, and sweetgum. Willow is primary in the low lying areas. Box elder and sycamore are also common. The understory consists of haws, deciduous holly, dogwood, elderberry, and seedlings of the overstory. Other understory plants include poison ivy, peppervine, greenbrier, and blackberry.

== Restoration ==
In 1989 the LDWF implemented a restoration project in cooperation with Ducks Unlimited, Inc. The result was two units, that can be operated independently and impacting 1,200 acres (490 ha), utilizing concrete spillways and gated culverts to control water flow and improve hydrology in forested wetlands.

== See also ==
- List of Louisiana Wildlife Management Areas
