= Bodcau Wildlife Management Area =

Protected area in Louisiana, United States

- Bodcau WMA
- Location within Louisiana
- Location: Bossier and Webster Parish, Louisiana
- Nearest city: Bossier City
- Coordinates: 32°49′05″N 93°27′34″W
- Area: 33,766 acres (136.65 km^{2})
- Governing body: Louisiana Department of Wildlife and Fisheries

Bodcau WMA

Bodcau Wildlife Management Area also referred to as Bodcau WMA, is a 33,766-acre (13,665 ha) tract of protected land located in Bossier and Webster Parish, Louisiana. The land is owned by the U.S. Army Corps of Engineers and managed under long-term lease by the Louisiana Department of Wildlife and Fisheries (LDWF).

== Description ==
The land within the WMA is predominantly bottomland hardwoods with two dams and lakes. The WMA narrowly follows Bodcau Creek (Bodcau Bayou), averaging 1.5 miles (2.4 km) in width, from the Arkansas line 30 miles (48 km) to just downstream of the Bayou Bodcau Dam and Reservoir located 17 miles (27 km) northeast of Bossier City.

== Wildlife ==
=== Deer ===
Whitetail deer are in abundance as Bossier and Webster Parish are in the top 20 list of forested acres per deer. The Louisiana estimated deer population of 500,000 increased because of the wet rainy season and flooding around the state.

==== Concerns ====
There are concerns of the possibility of chronic wasting disease in Louisiana deer populations so there are import restrictions to battle this possibility. Local biologists are asking hunters to donate fifteen deer head from each of Caddo, Bossier and DeSoto parishes. 360 deer were tested during the 2015–16 hunting season with no positive results.

=== Fish ===
The LDWF host the Family Fish Fest in May of every year at Ivan Lake.

=== Dove ===
Bodcau has two dove hunting fields and as with other Louisiana WMA's non-toxic shot no larger than #6 must be used.

== Bayou Bodcau Dam and Reservoir ==
Construction of Bayou Bodcau Dam and Reservoir began in May 1947 and was completed in December 1949 pursuant to Louisiana Congressional approval in 1938 and 1939. Initially built for flood control, the dam and reservoir subsequent legislation authorized multi-purpose functions such as natural resource management, environmental stewardship, and public recreation, as well as flood damage reduction. E.C. Long owned a log cabin as early as 1843 and operated a ferry on Bayou Bodcau. Newsome Andrew and Elizabeth Rebecca Young Durden purchased the land and cabin. The cabin was destroyed by fire, rebuilt in 1925, and serves as an environmental education center for northwest Louisiana.

== Ivan Lake ==
Ivan Lake is also within the WMA and was formed after the completion of a 1,300 ft Ogee spillway across Caney Creek in 1958. The impoundment created a 520 acres (210 ha) lake providing 55 square miles of area (35,200 acres) watershed. The dam required repairs and the lake suffered from hydrilla infestation and eutrophication so was drained in 2004. The lake was refilled in 2012 and restocked.

== Amenities ==
The WMA operates the Bodcau Wildlife Management Area Shooting Range. The celebration of the National Hunting and Fishing Day is observed with activities directed at younger citizens. Louisiana has celebrated every year since President Richard Nixon signed proclamation 4128 designating the Fourth Saturday in September as "National Hunting and Fishing Day".

== See also ==
- List of Louisiana Wildlife Management Areas
