= Biloxi Wildlife Management Area =

Protected area in Louisiana, United States

- Biloxi WMA
- IUCN category V (protected landscape/seascape)
- Location within Louisiana
- Location: St. Bernard Parish, Louisiana
- Coordinates: 30°01′34″N 89°29′45″W
- Area: 35,644 acres (144.25 km^{2})
- Established: 1957 (initial)
- Governing body: Louisiana Department of Wildlife and Fisheries

Biloxi WMA

Biloxi Wildlife Management Area also referred to as Biloxi WMA, is a 35,644-acre (14,425 ha) privately owned tract of protected marsh land located in St. Bernard Parish, Louisiana, managed by the Louisiana Department of Wildlife and Fisheries (LDWF). The land is owned by Biloxi Marsh Lands Corporation, owning approximately 90,000 acres (36,000 ha) of land in St. Bernard Parish, that started leasing land to the LDWF as early as 1957. Access is limited to boats as there are no roads in the WMA. The nearest road access is LA 46 to Shell Beach or LA 624 to Hopedale.

== WMA land acquisition ==
The land is owned by Biloxi Marsh Lands Corporation that first entered into leasing arrangements with the LDWF in 1957. The company retains the exclusive right to conduct mineral exploration as well as other business interests on the property. The LDWF now manages 35,644 acres (14,425 ha).

== Location ==
The WMA is located approximately 40 miles (64 km) east of New Orleans, north of the Mississippi River–Gulf Outlet Canal (MRGO), that was closed to commercial shipping traffic after surge amplification during Hurricane Katrina, on the east shore of Lake Borgne, in northeastern Saint Bernard Parish. The land is considered brackish to saline marsh.

The Biloxi Wildlife Management Area lies in a region that is vulnerable to coastal erosion, and the marsh offers valuable ecosystem services such as storm-surge mitigation for settlements such as New Orleans, and high-tide shelter for small mammals. In July 2023, the Coastal Protection and Restoration Authority completed a project nearby, titled Biloxi Marsh Living Shoreline, consisting of concrete units designed to attenuate wave energy and to foster commercially viable oyster reefs along 11 miles (18 km) of shoreline.

== See also ==
- List of Louisiana Wildlife Management Areas
- Coastal erosion in Louisiana
