= Clear Creek Wildlife Management Area =

Protected area in western Louisiana, US

- Clear Creek Wildlife Management Area
- Location within Louisiana
- Location: Vernon Parish, Louisiana
- Nearest city: Leesville, Louisiana
- Coordinates: 31°0′38.8944″N 93°26′23″W
- Area: 52,559 acres (212.70 km^{2})
- Governing body: State of Louisiana through the Louisiana Department of Wildlife and Fisheries

Clear Creek WMA

Clear Creek Wildlife Management Area is a 52,559-acre (21,270 ha) tract of protected area located in Vernon Parish, Louisiana. The Louisiana Department of Wildlife and Fisheries (LDWF) leases the land from Hancock Timber.

== History ==
The land formally belonged to Forest Capital Partners, LLC, and was purchased, by Molpus Woodlands Group and The Hancock Timber Resource Group (Hancock Timber) in a 1.88 million acre land deal.

== Location ==
The property is bordered on the north by LA 8 (west of Anacoco Lake) and LA 111, that runs from Burr Ferry, through Evans towards Merryville, forms the western border, with the WMA crossing the highway in three areas in the southern half. The eastern and southern border is Bayou Anacoco that drains into the Sabine River (Texas–Louisiana). LA 464 runs diagonally northeast to southwest through the WMA.

== Description ==
The WMA is planted predominantly with company timber land, criss-crossed by several parish roads, oil field roads, and other gravel roads, with a sand pit and logging pond on the property. There is what is now called a cultural lookout tower known locally as the Evans lookout tower, also referred to as the Evans fire tower.

== Like named areas ==
- Clear Creek Conservation Area in Vernon County, Missouri.
- Clear Creek State Park in Pennsylvania
- Clear Creek (Atlanta)
- Clear Creek State Forest in Pennsylvania
- Clear Creek Trail in Grand Canyon National Park
- Clear Creek (Colorado)
- Clear Creek Campground in Grant Parish, Louisiana.
- Clear Creek Campground, Pollock, Louisiana, in Kisatchie National Forest east of US 165, and northwest of Louisiana National Guard Training Center Pineville and the Esler Field Wildlife Management Area.

== See also ==
- Clear Creek (disambiguation)
