= Esler Field Wildlife Management Area =

Protected area in the US state of Louisiana

- Esler Field WMA
- Location within Louisiana
- Location: Rapides Parish and Grant Parish, Louisiana
- Nearest city: Alexandria
- Coordinates: 31°26′15″N 92°17′24″W
- Area: 12,500 acres (51 km^{2})
- Governing body: Louisiana Army National Guard through the Louisiana Department of Wildlife and Fisheries

Esler Field Wildlife Management Area (WMA) is a protected area of 12,500 acres (5,100 ha) in Rapides and Grant parishes in the state of Louisiana.

== Name ==
The Louisiana Army National Guard (LANG) announced in March 2023 that Camp Beauregard would be renamed the Louisiana National Guard Training Center-Pineville. The WMA was renamed Esler Field Wildlife Management Area.

== Location ==
The WMA is located approximately 8 miles (13 km) northeast of Alexandria with access from LA 116 and US-165.

== Wildlife management ==
The primary use is for the National Guard training facility. There are many areas marked with DO NOT ENTER signs, as either the area may be an impact area (when Compartment I & J are closed) or "off limits" at all times marked with "Danger: Unexploded Ordinance (sic) Area".

The Louisiana Army National Guard signed a Management Agreement with the Nature Conservancy in 1996 covering 2,672 acres (1,081 ha) as part of the Lower West Gulf Coastal Plain ecoregion.

=== Permits ===
WMA Access Permits are required on any lands administered by the Louisiana Department of Wildlife and Fisheries. This includes not only wildlife management areas but wildlife refuges, wildlife conservation areas (WCAs), and LDWF shooting ranges and education facilities.

Any person using LDWF administered lands must use a Self-Clearing Permit, either from a self-clearing Permit Station or by checking in and out electronically through the LDWF Self-Clearing Permit app or on an internet Web portal.

== Flora ==
The upland overstory is primarily a pine plantation. In the creek bottoms, the overstory is predominantly water oak, post oak, hickory, red oak and sweetgum. Approximately 800 acres (320 ha) of the Flagon Creek bottom flood. The primary overstory in this area is cypress, overcup oak and bitter pecan.

When the understory is good, it consists of French mulberry, blackberry, greenbrier, yaupon, trumpet creeper, and rattan. In the creek bottom, the common understory is swamp privet, water elm, mayhaw, and swamp snowbell.

== See also ==
- List of Louisiana Wildlife Management Areas
