= State Wildlife Refuge =

Protected area in Louisiana, United States

- IUCN category V (protected landscape/seascape)
- Location within Louisiana
- Location: Vermilion Parish, Louisiana
- Coordinates: 29°37′20″N 92°8′7″W
- Area: 13,000 acres (53 km^{2})
- Established: 1911
- Governing body: Louisiana Department of Wildlife and Fisheries

State Wildlife Refuge is a 13,000-acre (5,300 ha) wildlife sanctuary managed by the Louisiana Department of Wildlife and Fisheries (LDWF), in Vermilion Parish, Louisiana. The land was donated to the state in 1911 by conservationist Edward McIlhenny and Charles Ward.

== Conservation ==
With the State Wildlife Refuge's 13,000 acres, the Audubon's 26,000 acres (11,000 ha) Paul J. Rainey Wildlife Sanctuary to the west and the 76,664 acres (31,025 ha) Marsh Island Wildlife Refuge to the east, as well as the 71,905 acres (29,099 ha) White Lake Wetlands Conservation Area there is around 187,569 acres (75,906 ha) of sanctuary in the parish.

Wildlife includes Snow goose, Canada goose, Mourning dove, Common gallinule, American coot, Ring-billed gull, Caspian tern, Royal tern, Double-crested cormorant, Roseate spoonbill, Little blue heron, Snowy egret, Western cattle egret, Great egret, Great blue heron, Black vulture, Turkey vulture, Osprey, Red-tailed hawk, Belted kingfisher, American crow, European starling, Northern mockingbird, American robin, Red-winged blackbird, Common grackle, and Boat-tailed grackle. Other wildlife include alligators, shrimp, blue crabs, red drum, spotted seatrout, and mammals such as raccoons, muskrats, nutria, mink, and white-tailed deer.

== Location ==
The refuge is located around 6 miles (9.7 km) south of Intracoastal City and east of Pecan Island. The majority of the northern and eastern side of the refuge borders the southwestern shore of Vermilion Bay.
