= Ben Lilly Conservation Area =

Protected area in Morehouse Parish, Louisiana

- IUCN category V (protected landscape/seascape)
- Location within Louisiana
- Location: Morehouse Parish
- Coordinates: 32°53′49″N 91°50′16″W
- Area: 247 acres (100 ha)
- Established: 2013
- Governing body: Louisiana Department of Wildlife and Fisheries

Ben Lilly Conservation Area

Ben Lilly Conservation Area is a 247-acre (100 ha) tract of protected area located in Morehouse Parish, Louisiana, USA. The Louisiana Department of Wildlife and Fisheries (LDWF) became the new owner in 2013.

== Name ==
The conservation area received its name from notorious big game hunter Ben Lilly, who was a guide for Theodore Roosevelt, when he hunted bear in the Tensas River swamp in 1907.

== Description ==
The 247-acre (100 ha) conservation area is bordered by the 503-acre (204 ha) Chemin-A-Haut State Park to the north and Bayou Bartholomew makes a horseshoe boundary around the east, south and west sides. The conservation area is accessible through the state park from US 425, north of Bastrop, Louisiana, or by boat and a boat ramp is planned.

== Shared name ==
The conservation area shares the name with the Ben Lilly campground located in the Gila National Forest.
