= Fort Polk-Vernon Wildlife Management Area =

Protected area in Louisiana

Fort Johnson-Vernon Wildlife Management Area
- Location within Louisiana Location within the United States
- Location: Vernon Parish, Louisiana
- Coordinates: 31°7′15″N 93°10′4″W
- Area: 105,545 acres (427.13 km^{2})
- Governing body: U.S. Army and U.S. Forest Service

Fort Johnson-Vernon WMA

Fort Polk-Vernon Wildlife Management Area is a 105,545-acre tract (42,713 ha) of protected area in Louisiana within the United States Army military reservation of Fort Polk. The WMA is located approximately ten miles southeast of Leesville, in Vernon Parish, east of U.S. Highway 171, one mile south of Louisiana Highway 28 and one mile north of Louisiana Highway 10.

The new name was the result of the renaming of Fort Polk and the WMA on June 13, 2023. The new name was reverted when Fort Johnson was renamed back to Fort Polk in 2025.

== 2025 government shutdown ==
The WMA closed at the beginning of the U.S. government shutdown and will remain closed until further notice. There may be areas inside the post open for deer archery hunting, and would require contacting the base.

== See also ==
List of Louisiana Wildlife Management Areas
