= White Lake Wetlands Conservation Area =

Protected area in Louisiana, United States

- Location within Louisiana
- Location: Vermilion Parish, Louisiana, United States
- Coordinates: 29°52′51″N 92°31′11″W
- Area: 71,905 acres (290.99 km^{2})
- Named for: White Lake
- Governing body: Louisiana Department of Wildlife and Fisheries

White Lake Wetlands Conservation Area (WLWCA), officially the White Lake Property, is a 71,905-acre tract of protected area located 7.4 miles (11.9 km) south of Gueydan at the south end of Louisiana Highway 91 in Vermilion Parish, Louisiana.

== Description ==
The conservation area borders the entire north shore area of White Lake, with a diverse habitat, is self-sustaining, and managed by the Louisiana Department of Wildlife and Fisheries (LDWF). There are approximately 53,249 acres of freshwater marsh and 18,656 acres of leased property that includes croplands, wetlands, wooded areas, and campsites. Fee based hunting is allowed in certain areas. There are many canals (including the Intracoastal Waterway in the northern part. There are names like "Blackfish Pirogue Trail, Stanolind Canal, Florence Canal, Lake Le Bleu, and a part of Blackfish lake, along with many other lakes, ponds, and waterways.

== History ==
On July 8, 2002, BP donated the area to the State of Louisiana, managed by White Lake Preservation Inc., and on January 1, 2005, by Act 613 of the 2004 Regular Legislative Session (Senate Bill 118), the LDWF took control. Previous owners were Stanolind Oil and Gas Company, that became Amoco before becoming BP, Wright Morrow (1935), Yount-Lee Oil Company from P. L. Lawrence, et. ux (1931), included a portion purchased by M. F. Yount from Elizabeth M. Watkins (1929), and BP managed the property before transferring it to the state.

In 1950 a single Whooping crane was captured and transported to the Aransas National Wildlife Refuge in Texas joining twenty-six others as the last of the wild flock of whooping cranes in the world. The Louisiana bird died but the rest multiplied into a flock of three hundred. The main reason for starting new colonies are concerns that a single hurricane or disease outbreak could end in the extinction of the Whooping crane.

== Flora ==
Flora is abundant in White Lake Conservation Area and includes Maidencane, Bull Tongue, Cattail, Jamaican Sawgrass (Cladium jamaicense), Roseau Cane, Spikerush, Walter's Millet (Echinochloa walteri), and Buttonbush.

== Fauna ==
There is an abundance of wildlife including deer, alligator, dove, and squirrel. Waterfowl include the Black-crowned night heron, ducks, and Whooping cranes among others.

=== Whooping crane ===
The Whooping crane, once abundant in Louisiana, was extirpated by the 1950s. In 2011 a joint effort between the U.S. Fish and Wildlife Service, Canadian Wildlife Service, the U.S. Geological Survey, and the International Crane Foundation, in cooperation with the LDWF and the Louisiana Cooperative Fish and Wildlife Research Unit, to reintroduce non-migratory Whooping cranes to Louisiana. Until there is a sustainable population future cranes will come from one of the existing captive breeding flocks in Patuxent Wildlife Research Center in Maryland, the International Crane Foundation in Wisconsin, and the Calgary Zoo in Alberta, Canada. WLWCA and Rockefeller Wildlife Refuge were chosen for the release.

With the release of 14 cranes in 2014, from the facilities in Maryland and Wisconsin, this brought the total population in Louisiana to 40. on April 11 and April 13, 2016, two new chicks hatched on private property in Jefferson Davis Parish.

=== Bird watching ===
There is a two-mile bird watching and nature trail, running along the north side with an elevated observation deck, allowing nature photography, birdwatching, and educational field trips to see the approximately 300 species of birds, of which 174 have been documented

== See also ==
List of Louisiana Wildlife Management Areas
