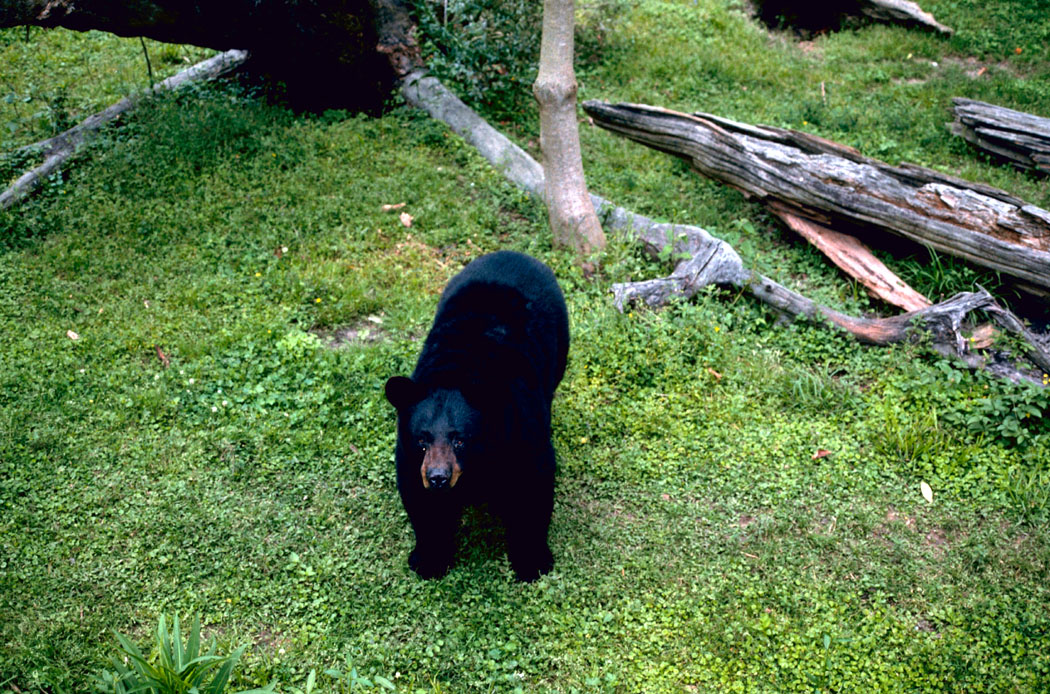

Conservation status
- Imperiled (NatureServe)

- Delisted (ESA)

Scientific classification
- Kingdom: Animalia
- Phylum: Chordata
- Class: Mammalia
- Order: Carnivora
- Family: Ursidae
- Genus: Ursus
- Species: U. americanus
- Subspecies: U. a. luteolus

Trinomial name
- Ursus americanus luteolus Griffith, 1821

= Louisiana black bear =

Subspecies of carnivore

The Louisiana black bear (Ursus americanus luteolus), one of 16 subspecies of the American black bear, is found in parts of Louisiana, mainly along the Mississippi River Valley and the Atchafalaya River Basin. It was classified as 'threatened' under the U.S. Endangered Species Act from 1992–2016. The validity of this subspecies has been repeatedly debated.

== Description ==
The subspecies does not have a substantially different external appearance than the nominate U. americanus americanus, but the skull is relatively long, narrow and flat and the molars are proportionately large. The fur color is usually black, but a cinnamon phase is known to exist.

== Distribution and habitat ==
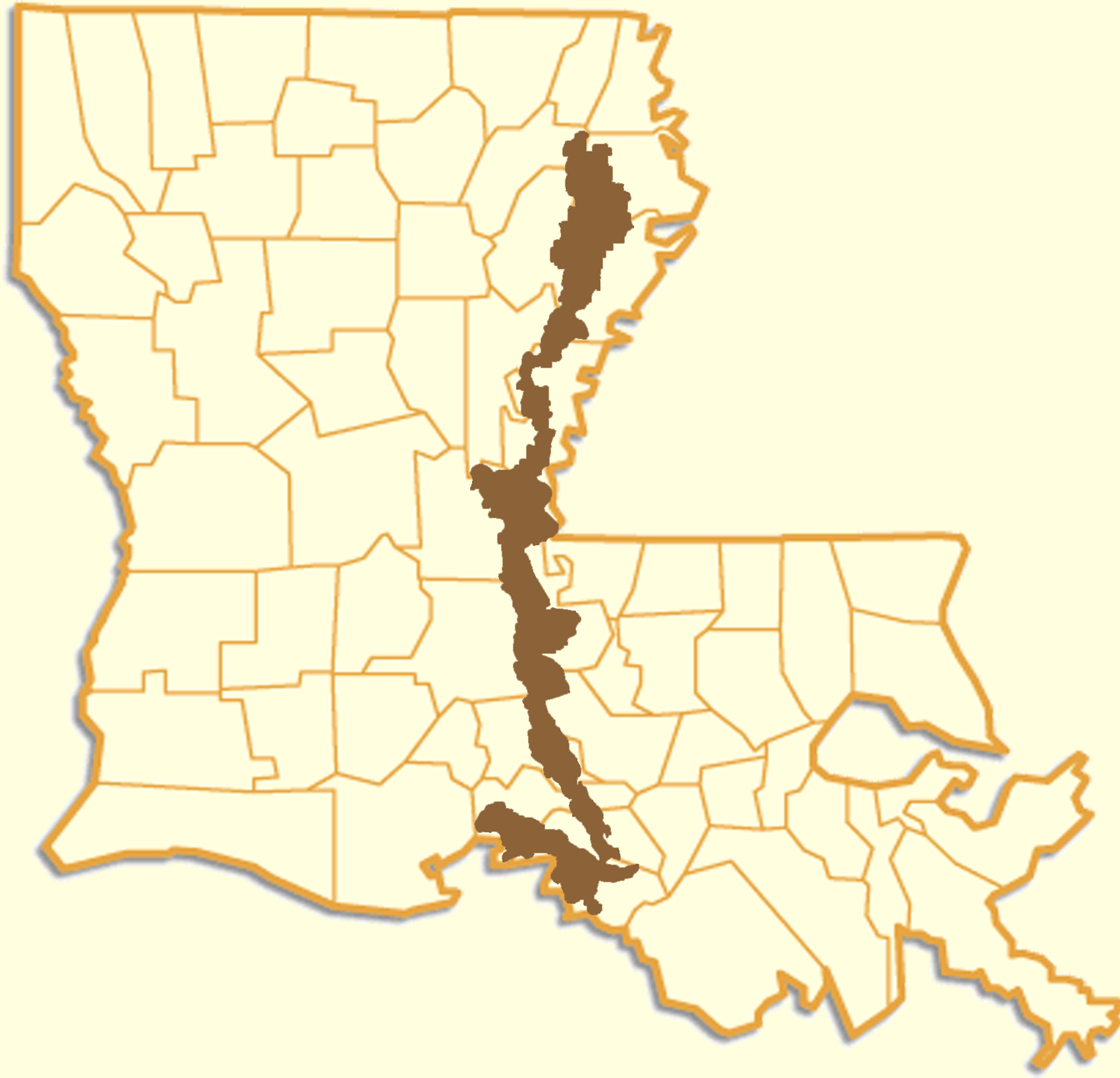
Louisiana Black Bear Habitat

The Louisiana black bear historically occurred in Louisiana, Mississippi, East Texas and Arkansas.

Four areas are currently known to have populations of the black bear:

- St. Mary Parish and Iberia Parish in south Louisiana,
- Pointe Coupee Parish in central Louisiana,
- the Richard K. Yancey Wildlife Management Area in Concordia and Avoyelles Parishes, in east-central Louisiana
- Tensas, Madison, and West Carroll Parishes in northeast Louisiana.

The Louisiana black bear can travel for long distances and has been sighted in many areas of Louisiana not normally considered bear habitat. Occurrences are reported from East Texas and subpopulations have expanded into Mississippi. Black bears have been sighted in Kisatchie National Forest, Allen Parish, Natchitoches Parish, East Baton Rouge, and Bossier City.

== Conservation ==
While the IUCN classifies the conservation situation of the black bear as a species as Least Concern, the Louisiana black bear as a subspecies was listed as 'threatened' under the U.S. Endangered Species Act in 1992. Under this ruling, all bears within the historic range of the Louisiana black bear, from eastern Texas to southern Mississippi, have been protected. On April 11, 2016, this protection of the Louisiana black bear was eliminated as were the related Similarity-of-Appearance Protections for the American black bear.

Loss of habitat was the primary reason the bear was placed on the federal endangered species list. Programs and initiatives have resulted in the conservation and restoration of over 600,000 acres (240,000 ha) of forestland in the Mississippi River floodplain of Louisiana. The Louisiana Department of Wildlife and Fisheries and the U.S. Fish and Wildlife Service have acquired land for Wildlife Management Areas and National Wildlife Refuges. Reforestation on private property has been accomplished through U.S.D.A. programs such as the Wetlands Reserve Program and Conservation Reserve Program, the American Forest Foundation, as well as through programs of private conservation organizations such as the Black Bear Conservation Coalition (BBCC), The Nature Conservancy and Ducks Unlimited.

=== Hunting ===
With the federal delisting, the Louisiana Department of Wildlife and Fisheries is solely responsible for black bear conservation and protection. The 2024 hunting season allowed for the issuance of limited permits, resulting in the harvest of 10 bears and 16 for the 2025 season. Organizations that oppose Louisiana black bear hunting are The Humane Society of Louisiana, and Atchafalaya Basinkeeper (ABK)

The Florida black bear was also hunted by permit in 2025, with 52 being taken out of 172 permits. The bear population of Florida is estimated to contain over 4,000 animals. The state joins 30 others that allow regulated hunting of black bears. Opponents in Florida include The Sierra Club, Bear Warriors, which led an unsuccessful attempt with a court order against the FWC, and Bear Defenders. The FWC has constitutional authority (Article IV, Section 9) to regulate and manage fish and wildlife resources.
