= Sabine Island Wildlife Management Area =

Protected area in Louisiana, United States

- Sabine Island Wildlife Game Management Area/ Sabine Island WMA
- IUCN category V (protected landscape/seascape)
- Location within Louisiana
- Location: Calcasieu Parish, Louisiana
- Nearest city: Vinton, Louisiana
- Coordinates: 30°12′44″N 93°41′34″W
- Area: 8,343 acres (33.76 km^{2})
- Established: 1990
- Governing body: Louisiana Office of State Lands, Calcasieu Parish School Board (owners), and Louisiana Department of Wildlife and Fisheries.

Sabine Island Wildlife Management Area also referred to as Sabine Island Wildlife Game Management Area, shortened to Sabine Island WMA, is a 8,343 acres (3,376 ha) tract of protected area located in Calcasieu Parish, Louisiana. The WMA is managed by the Louisiana Department of Wildlife and Fisheries (LDWF).

== History ==
Sabine Island was in a contested boundary area between the United States and Spain, which took control of the territory from France, with the Treaty of Fontainebleau of 1762. In 1801, the secret Third Treaty of San Ildefonso was signed, which resulted in the Treaty of Aranjuez in 1801. This treaty officially transferred the Louisiana territory back to France. In 1803, the United States acquired the territory through the Louisiana Purchase. During the back-and-forth transfer and resulting purchase by the United States, the western boundary was ill-defined but controversially considered to be the Arroyo Hondo, now called the Calcasieu River. To avoid war, an agreement was made in 1806 to create a buffer zone through the Neutral Ground Agreement, from the Arroyo Hondo to the Sabine River. This created what became known as the Sabine Free State. The Adams–Onís Treaty of 1819, ratified in 1821, finally settled the dispute, and the boundary was set to the western side of the Sabine River. The Louisiana State Land Office incrementally purchased the land from the US government beginning on March 2, 1858.

== Description ==
The Sabine Island is surrounded by water. The Sabine River flows to the south and west, with Old River and Big Bayou to the east and north. The northern boundary is a point south of Wembly Island and Cutoff Bayou. The southern boundary is at the confluence of the Sabine and Old River north of Horseshoe Lake. Turner Island is to the south. The WMA has several bayous: Cross Bayou, Cooper Bayou, Brenam Bayou, and Watson Bayou. Lakes are Cross Bayou Lake and Lost Lake. The Louisiana State Land Office incrementally purchased the land from the US government beginning on March 2, 1858.

The flora is predominantly cypress (Taxodium distichum) and tupelo. There is also white and willow oak, sweetgum, as well as loblolly pine. The understory includes smilax, rattan, Southern Arrowwood, Japanese honeysuckle, blackberries, and dewberries. The fauna on the six mile by four mile island includes alligators, slider turtles, anhingas, woodpeckers, Kingfishers, and large mouth bass, catfish, and alligator gar.
