= Russell Sage Wildlife Management Area =

Protected area in Louisiana, United States

- IUCN category V (protected landscape/seascape)
- Location within Louisiana
- Location: Caldwell, Morehouse, Ouachita, and Richland Parishes, Louisiana
- Coordinates: 32°27′56″N 91°57′32″W
- Area: 38,213 acres (154.64 km^{2})
- Established: 1960 (original 15,000 acres)
- Governing body: Louisiana Department of Wildlife and Fisheries
- Website: www.wlf.louisiana.gov/page/russell-sage

Russell Sage WMA

Russell Sage Wildlife Management Area, also referred to as Russell Sage WMA, is a 38,213-acre (15,464 ha) protected area in Caldwell, Morehouse, Ouachita, and Richland Parishes, Louisiana. It was the first WMA owned by the Louisiana Department of Wildlife and Fisheries upon purchasing 15,000 acres of property in 1960. The WMA is located about seven miles east of Monroe and 10 miles west of Rayville. The 2,767-acre Kennedy Tract was purchased in 2015. There are 2,955 acres owned by the U.S. Army Corps of Engineers, 1,240 acres owned by the Ouachita Parish School Board, and 13,332 acre Ouachita WMA that was consolidated in 2015.

== See also ==
- List of Louisiana Wildlife Management Areas
