= Buttonwood =

Buttonwood or Buttonwoods may refer to:

- "Buttonwood", a finance column in The Economist
- Buttonwood Agreement, 1792 effort to organize securities trading that created the predecessor of the New York Stock Exchange

== Plants ==
Buttonwood or button wood might refer to:

- Conocarpus, a genus of flowering plants native to tropical regions of the world, particularly:
  - Conocarpus erectus, native to tropical and subtropical regions around the world
- Platanus, a genus of tree species native to the Northern Hemisphere, particularly:
  - Platanus occidentalis, native to North America
- Glochidion, a genus of flowering plants distributed from Madagascar to the Pacific Islands, particularly:
  - Glochidion ferdinandi, native to eastern Australia

== Places ==
- Buttonwood, Pennsylvania, a village along Pennsylvania Route 284
- Buttonwood Corners, New Jersey, an unincorporated community
- Buttonwood Covered Bridge, a covered bridge in the US state of Pennsylvania

== Institutions ==
- Buttonwood Park Historic District, a historic district in New Bedford, Massachusetts
- Buttonwood Park Zoo, a zoo in New Bedford, Massachusetts
- Buttonwoods Beach Historic District, a historic district in Warwick, Rhode Island
- Buttonwoods Museum, a museum in Haverhill, Massachusetts

== See also ==
- Buttonbush, plants
