= Maurepas Swamp Wildlife Management Area =

Protected area in Louisiana, United States

- IUCN category V (protected landscape/seascape)
- Location within Louisiana
- Location: Ascension, Livingston, St. John the Baptist, St. James and Tangipahoa Parishes., Louisiana
- Coordinates: 30°8′47″N 90°30′59″W
- Area: 112,615 acres (455.74 km^{2})
- Governing body: Louisiana Department of Wildlife and Fisheries

Maurepas Swamp WMA

Maurepas Swamp Wildlife Management Area is a 112,615-acre (45,574 ha) tract of protected area located in parts of Ascension, Livingston, St. John the Baptist, St. James and Tangipahoa Parishes, Louisiana, encircling three sides of Lake Maurepas.

== History ==
In 2001 the Richard King Mellon Foundation donated 61,633 acres to the Louisiana Department of Wildlife & Fisheries (LDWF). Between 2002 and 2012 another 12,000 acres was added to the WMA. In 2011 the Land Trust for Louisiana and the National Audubon Society partnered to permanently protect 675 acres of critical migratory bird habitat near the town of Maurepas. In 2012 the LDWF, along with the Entergy Charitable Foundation and the National Fish and Wildlife Foundation added 400 acres to the WMA. M.C. Davis sold 29,630 to the Conservation Fund in 2012. The Coastal Protection and Restoration Authority's (CPRA) Coastal Protection and Restoration Initiative provided $4.5 million and the Louisiana Wildlife and Fisheries Foundation (LWFF) provided $2 million to purchase the land, known as the "MC Davis tract", that joined the existing east and west WMA together. A result of the BP Deepwater Horizon oil spill was a partial settlement between MOEX and the United States Justice Department, that resulted in the state receiving $6.75 million in Clean Water Act penalty money. This was used to purchase 11,145 acres of forested wetlands located on the north side of the lake.

== Flora ==
The WMA has bull tongue, cattail, submerged aquatics, red maple, American elm, sugarberry, Nutall oak, water oak, obtusa oak, tupelo gum (Nyssa sylvatica), and bald cypress (Taxodium distichum). Invasive species of fern-leaved beggarticks (Bidens ferulifolia), alligator weed (Alternanthera philoxeroides), water hyacinth (Eichhornia crassipes), and common salvinia (Salvinia minima) have overgrown parts of the WMA, requiring controlling action.

== See also ==
- List of Louisiana Wildlife Management Areas
