= Thistlethwaite Wildlife Management Area =

Protected area in the US state of Louisiana

- Location within Louisiana
- Location: St. Landry Parish, Louisiana
- Nearest city: Washington
- Coordinates: 30°39′29″N 91°59′48″W
- Area: 11,100 acres (45 km^{2})
- Governing body: Louisiana Department of Wildlife and Fisheries (LDWF)

Thistlethwaite Wildlife Management Area is a 17-square mile tract with over 11,000 acres of protected area under the Louisiana Department of Wildlife and Fisheries.

== Description ==
The 11,100-acre (4,500 ha) WMA has been leased from the Thistlethwaite family and in 2020 the agreement was renewed.

== Location ==
The WMA has several allaweather roads: Plant Road, Plant Spur 1 Road, North Road, North Spur 1 Right Road, North Spur 1 Left Road, North Spur 2 Road, North Spur 3 Road, North Spur 4 Road, North Spur 4 Road, North Spur 6 Road, Signo Road, Peck Ham Road, Ricefield Road, Babin Road, and East Road. Some of the roads in the WMA can be closed due to oilfield operations

== Geography ==
Bayou Wauksha the headwaters at the confluence of Clair Bayou and Turner Canal, also referred to as Bayau Wauxshie, Bayou Big Ouaksha, and Bayou Waksha, borders almost the entirety of the north-central to northeast, east, southeastern, and south-central boundaries of the WMA. Little Wauksha Bayou meanders through the WMA before emptying into Wauksha Bayou. LA 103 and LA 359 follow the bayou. Bayou Courtableau forms the southwestern boundary. The Bayou runs from the headwaters (about five miles north of Washington), at the confluence of Bayou Boeuf and Bayou Cocodrie, through Washington and under I-49, that forms the eastern boundary of the WMA. The bayou turns south a short piece after sharing a boundary with the WMA. Bayou Courtableau, watershed includes Bayou Carron, Bayou Wauksha (and Little Bayou Wauksha in the WMA), Grand Gully, Little Bayou Darbonne, Big Bayou Darbonne, 3 Diversion Canals, and all unnamed tributaries, are a subsegment of the Vermilion-Teche River Basin. Where Bayou Courtableau meets the West Atchafalaya Basin Protection Levee there is the Bayou Courtableau Control Structure that was completed in 1956. These are five reinforced concrete box culverts, each measuring 10 by 15 by 234 feet (3.0 by 4.6 by 71.3 m). The purpose is not only to allow water from Atchafalaya River into Bayou Courtableau but also is used for flood control.

Bayou Courtableau and the tributaries flood during moderate rains. Extensive rains cause severe flooding over the entire plain. A Chief of Engineers report in 1909, referred to an earlier report in 1891, that at the time there was no commerce, save log floating from timber cuts during high water, or commercial value in making improvements, as there was no great cultivation. The letter explained that only if there was opened a route from Plaquemine to New Orleans, and only if Bayou Courtableau was improved, that upstream improvements be made.

In 2021 an Engineering and Modeling program was funded to explore building a Bayou Courtableau to Bayou Amy Floodgate for secondary flood water management, besides the Bayou Courtableau West Atchafalaya Floodway West Guide Levee, that would benefit, by improving the water quality by additional freshwater, both upstream and downstream including Bayou Amy, Catahoula Lake, and Lake Dauterive and Lake Fausse Point. It is still in the planning stages. These improvements would improve the poor dissolved oxygen levels in the entire watershed.

Non-moving or very slow moving water can become stagnant over time and have depleted oxygen. The difference in the water, usually Black Water, Brown Water, Green Water can affect the type of aquatic wildlife.

== Wildlife ==
There is abundant wildlife in the WMA including deer, squirrel, rabbit, wood duck, and woodcock. Trapping for beaver, raccoon, mink, bobcat, otter, and opossum.

=== Birds ===
Thistlethwaite Wildlife Management Area is part of the America's Wetland Red River Birding Trail. There are Black-bellied whistling-duck Great Blue Herons, Little Blue Herons, Green Herons, Great Egret, Snowy Egret, Cattle Egrets, Yellow-crowned Night-Herons, and White Ibis and White-faced Ibis are frequently seen along with hawks, owls, woodpeckers, and neotropical migrant songbirds. The raptors are Red-shouldered Hawk, Mississippi Kite and Broad-winged Hawk.

=== Fish ===
Largemouth bass, white crappie and black crappie, also known as Sac-a-Lait and both are officially declared Louisiana’s state freshwater fish, various sunfish (often broadly labeled as "bream") with 10 species in Louisiana not counting the hybrids.

There are Bluegill, Green Sunfish (Lepomis cyanellus), Redear sunfish (Lepomis microlophus) also called Chinquapin, Shellcracker, Bream, Rouge Ear Sunfish, or Sun Perch,Longear sunfish (Lepomis megalotis), Warmouth (Lepomis gulosus) also called molly, redeye, goggle-eye, red-eyed bream, and strawberry perch, paddlefish, and Three species of largemouth catfish, the Blue catfish (Ictalurus furcatus with forked tail), Flathead catfish (non-forked tail), and Channel catfish (Ictalurus furcatus) along with the Brown Bullhead catfish.
