= Deciduous holly =

Deciduous holly is a common name for several plants in the Ilex genus and may refer to:

- Ilex decidua
- Ilex verticillata
