= Big Lake Wildlife Management Area =

Protected area in Louisiana, United States

- Big Lake State WMA
- Location within Louisiana
- Location: Franklin, Tensas, and Madison Parish, Louisiana
- Coordinates: 32°12′02″N 91°24′41″W
- Area: 19,231 acres (77.83 km^{2})
- Established: 1983 (initial)
- Governing body: Louisiana Department of Wildlife and Fisheries

Big Lake WMA

Big Lake Wildlife Management Area, (WMA) also referred to as Big Lake State WMA, is a 19,231 acres (7,783 ha) tract of protected land located in Franklin, Tensas, and Madison Parish, Louisiana, owned and managed by the Louisiana Department of Wildlife and Fisheries (LDWF).

== WMA land acquisition ==
The land for the WMA was purchased through the Rockefeller Fund between 1983 and 1985. The first was 9,833 acres (3,979 ha) purchased in 1983, The second was 4,888 acres (1,978 ha) purchased in 1984, and the last component was the purchase of 4,510 acres (1,830 ha) in 1985.

== Location ==
The location of the WMA is south of the Tensas River National Wildlife Refuge. The Tensas River snakes through portions of the WMA as well as providing the eastern border at several locations. Winnsboro, Crowville, and Swampers are to the west, with Swamper being the closest.

== See also ==
- List of Louisiana Wildlife Management Areas
