= Joyce Wildlife Management Area =

Protected area in Louisiana, United States

- Joyce WMA
- IUCN category V (protected landscape/seascape)
- Location within Louisiana
- Location: Tangipahoa, Parish, Louisiana
- Nearest city: Ponchatoula, Louisiana
- Coordinates: 30°22′07″N 90°22′57″W:
- Area: 34,520 acres (139.7 km^{2})
- Governing body: Louisiana Department of Wildlife and Fisheries, Joyce Foundation (851 acres), and Tangipahoa School Board (484 acres)
- Website: www.wlf.louisiana.gov/page/joyce

Joyce WMA

Joyce Wildlife Management Area is a 42,292-acre (17,115 ha) protected area in Tangipahoa Parish, Louisiana, owned by the Louisiana Department of Wildlife and Fisheries. It is located 10 miles (16 km) south of Hammond and features a boardwalk leading into the swamps on the northwest corner.

== Location ==
Joyce Wildlife Management Area is located to the east of I-55/US highway 51, that is the western boundary, and old highway 51 which is the feeder road. It sits to the northeast of Lake Maurepas and west of the northern tip of Lake Pontchartrain just south of Ponchatoula. The Tangipahoa River borders it on its northeast, runs through the east side, and the North pass and Pass Manchac are to the south.

== Description ==
The Joyce Foundation donated 12,809 acres (5,184 ha) in 1982 for the Joyce Wildlife Management Area. 2,250 acres (910 ha) was donated in 1994 by the Guste Heirs to the Louisiana Department of Wildlife and Fisheries. In 2008 The Conservation Fund helped add more than 7,200 acres (2,900 ha) to Joyce Wildlife Management Area. The purchase was land known as the Octavia Tract, previously leased by the Department of Wildlife and Fisheries, and included 100 acres (40 ha) of ancient Ponchatoula cypress, saved from lumber companies clear-cutting cypress harvest by then-mayor John Jacob Dahmer (1952–1960). Approximately 1,160 acres (470 ha) were added by the Salmen tract together referred to as the Salmen/Octavia Tract. 2,729 acres (1,104 ha) were added when the Dendinger Tract was added in 2010. 851 acres (344 ha) are leased from the Joyce Foundation and 484 acres (196 ha) are leased from Tangipahoa Parish School Board. There are 500 acres (200 ha) of freshwater marsh in the Wildlife Management Area.

Funding for the Octavia Tract was a joint public, private, and nonprofit partnership that included a National Oceanic and Atmospheric Administration grant ($1.67 million), a North American Wetland Conservation Act grant ($392,000) and $100,000 from the Department of Wildlife and Fisheries Trust Fund. The Conservation Fund was able to reduce the state's purchase price with $450,000 provided by a National Fish and Wildlife Foundation Grant through its partnership with Shell Oil ($250,000) and private funds donated through The Conservation Fund by Ameriprise Financial ($200,000).

=== Habitat ===
There are many species of animal, bird, and plant life with hunting, fishing, nature hiking, and bird watching as activities. Boating is limited to smaller craft such as Pirogues or canoes. Waterfowl, including wood duck, mottled duck, hooded merganser, and black-bellied whistling duck, are found in the area year-round. There is also white-tailed deer, other waterfowl, rabbit and squirrel. Fish including largemouth bass, chinquapin perch, and catfish. Alligators and other amphibians and reptiles are also common. The state listed endangered Bald eagles and osprey nests can be found in the Wildlife Management Area and its surrounding areas.

== Swamp Walk ==
A unique feature of the Joyce Wildlife Management Area is the Swamp Walk, a boardwalk built in 1990, that runs into the swamp from the northwest corner. The walk was severely damaged by Hurricane Isaac and closed pending reconstruction which was completed by January 21, 2015. In 2016 the Swamp Walk was closed for a period due to flooding.

== Issues ==
In 2006 the city of Hammond began discharging secondarily-treated municipal effluent into a portion of Joyce Wildlife Management Area known as "Four Mile Swamp". The intention of adding freshwater to the swamp, which had been cut off from natural water flow for over fifty years effectively killing the swamp, was revitalization. The discharge is monitored according to effluent guidelines and the Clean Water Act. The result was herbaceous vegetation growth but by late 2007 the emerging marsh began declining and converting into open water or mudflats. Of the several hypotheses of marsh loss one primary contributing factor was a marked increase of nutria (Myocastor coypus) and 2000 were eliminated in 2008. By 2010 there was a substantial recovery.
