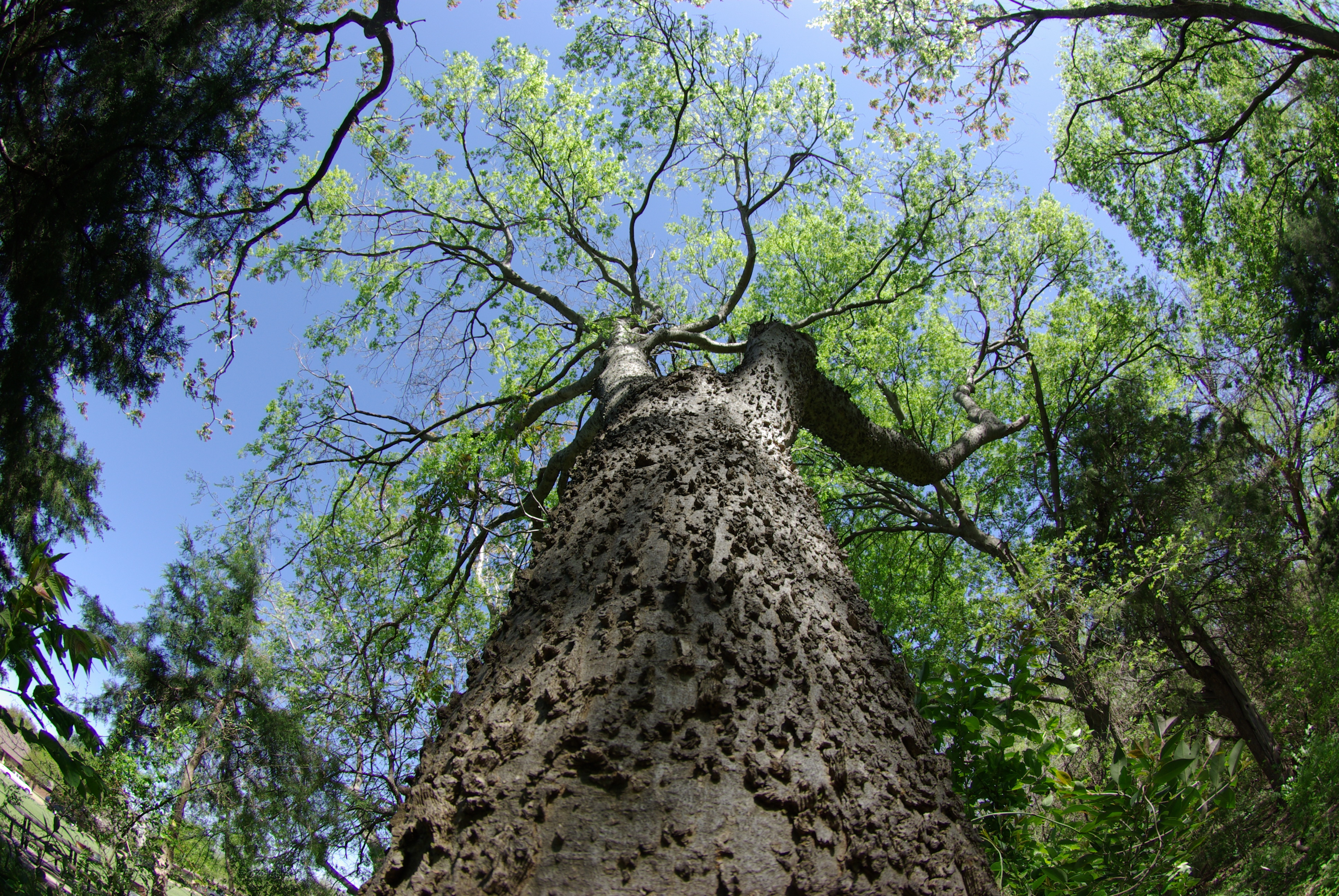

Conservation status
- Least Concern (IUCN 3.1)

Scientific classification
- Kingdom: Plantae
- Clade: Tracheophytes
- Clade: Angiosperms
- Clade: Eudicots
- Clade: Rosids
- Order: Rosales
- Family: Cannabaceae
- Genus: Celtis
- Species: C. laevigata

Binomial name
- Celtis laevigata Willdenow
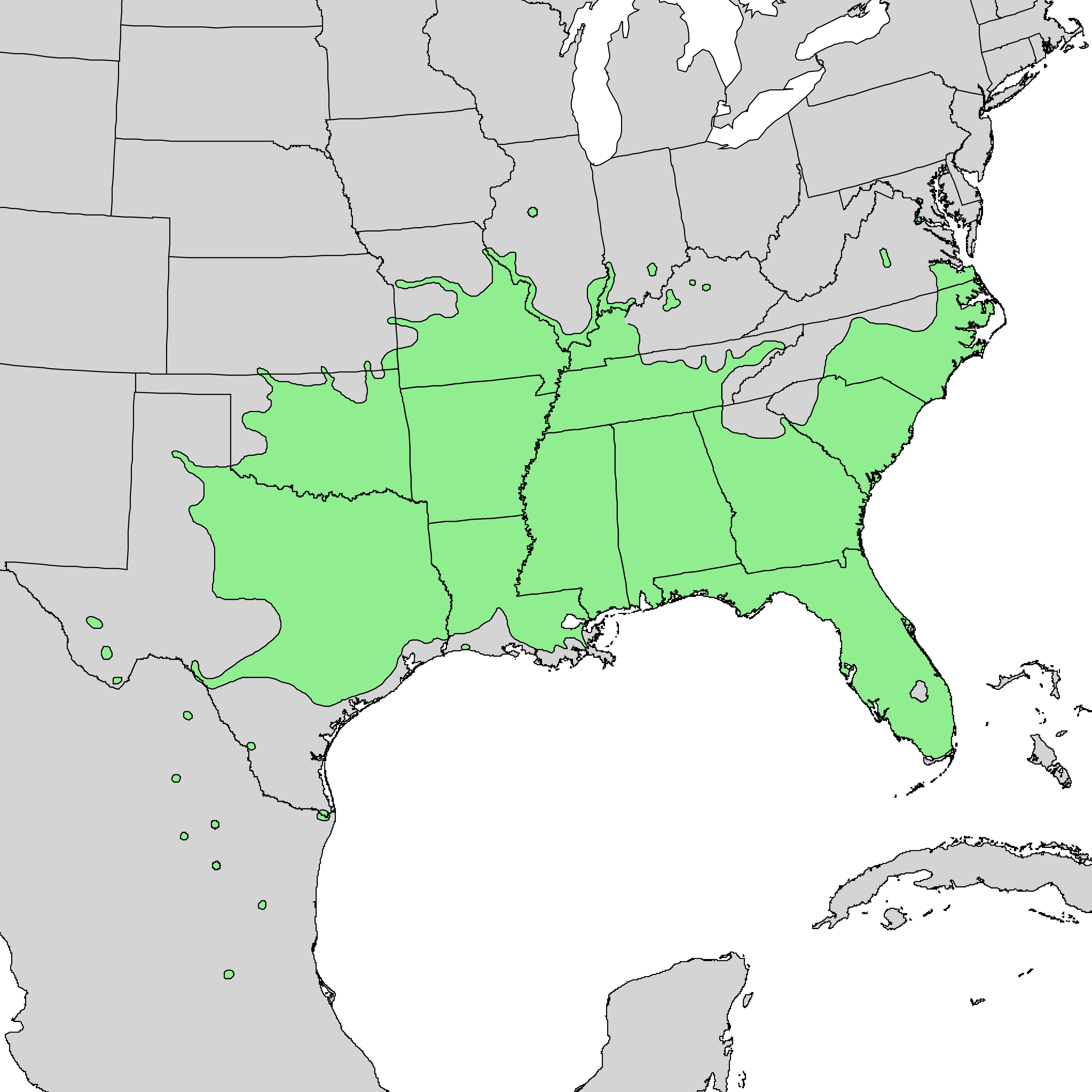
- Natural range of Celtis laevigata

= Celtis laevigata =

Species of tree

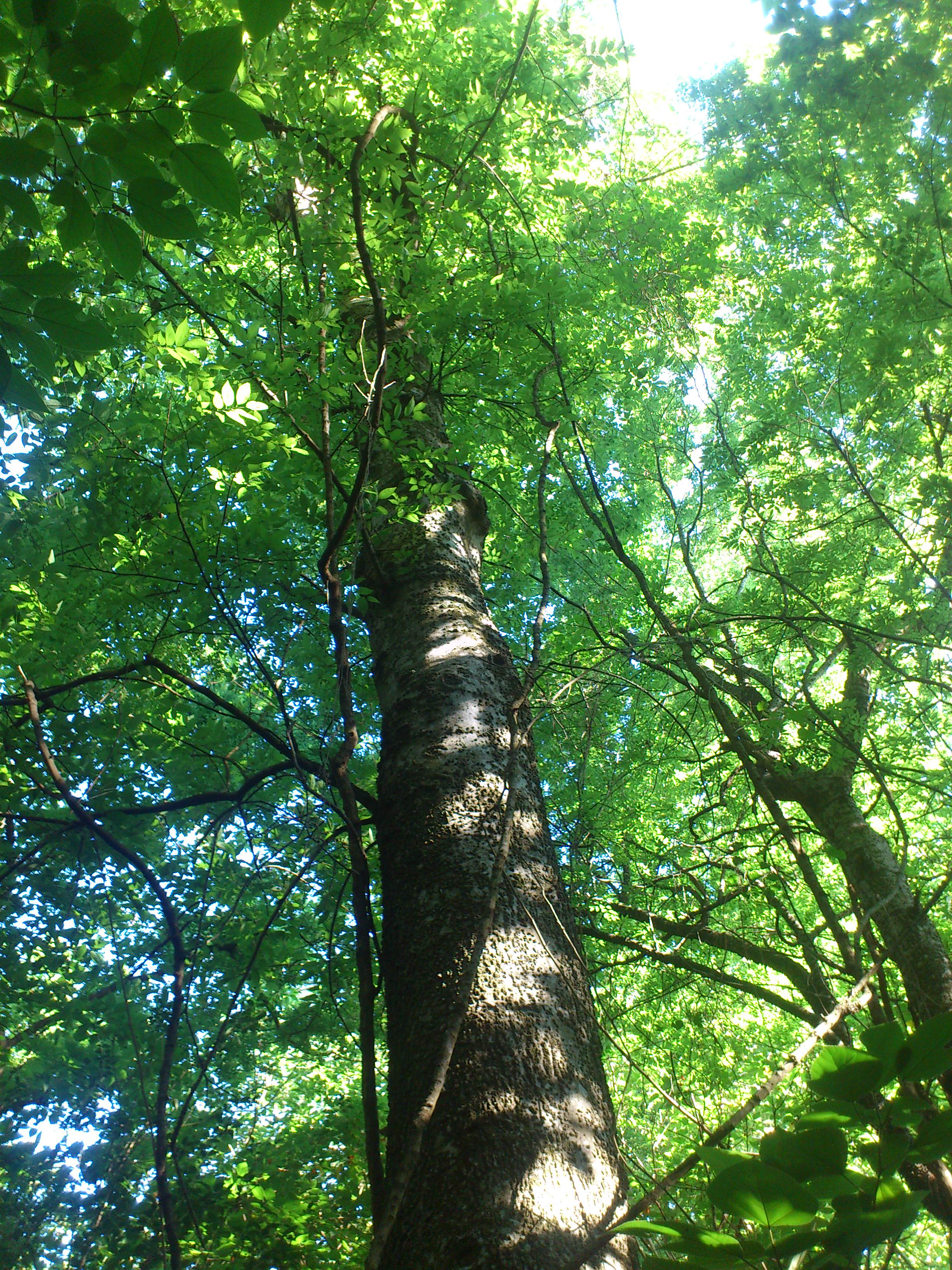
Celtis laevigata, Southeastern Louisiana.

Celtis laevigata is a medium-sized tree native to North America. Common names include sugarberry, southern hackberry, or in the southern U.S. sugar hackberry or just hackberry.

Sugarberry is easily confused with common hackberry (C. occidentalis) where the range overlaps. Sugarberry has narrower leaves with mostly smooth margins, the berries are juicier and sweeter, while the bark is less corky. The species can also be distinguished by habitat: where the ranges overlap, common hackberry occurs primarily in upland areas, whereas sugarberry occurs mainly in bottomland areas.

Sugarberry's range extends from the Southeastern United States west to Texas and south to northeastern Mexico. It is also found on the island of Bermuda.

== Ecology ==
Sugarberry occurs primarily along streams and in moist soils on floodplains. Its sweetish fruit is eaten by birds and rodents, helping to disperse the seeds. The leaves are eaten by a number of insects, for example caterpillars of the Io moth (Automeris io).

Sugarberry's leaf litter contains allelopathic chemicals that inhibit seed germination and growth in many other plant species.

== Cultivation and uses ==
Sugarberry mixed with hackberry supplies the lumber known as hackberry. Small amounts are used for dimension stock, veneer, and containers, but the main use of sugarberry wood is for furniture. The light-colored wood can be given a light- to medium-brown finish that in other woods must be achieved by bleaching. The wood is also used to produce sporting goods and plywood.

Sugarberry is frequently planted as a shade-tree within its range. It is well-adapted to urban areas; its elm-like shape and warty bark make it an attractive landscape tree.

== Gallery ==
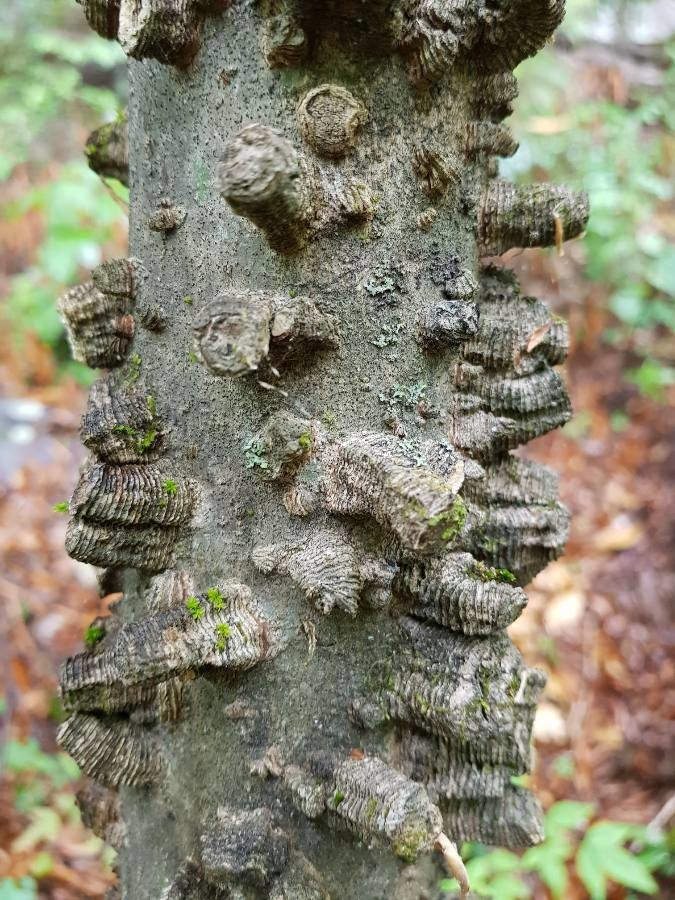
Bark

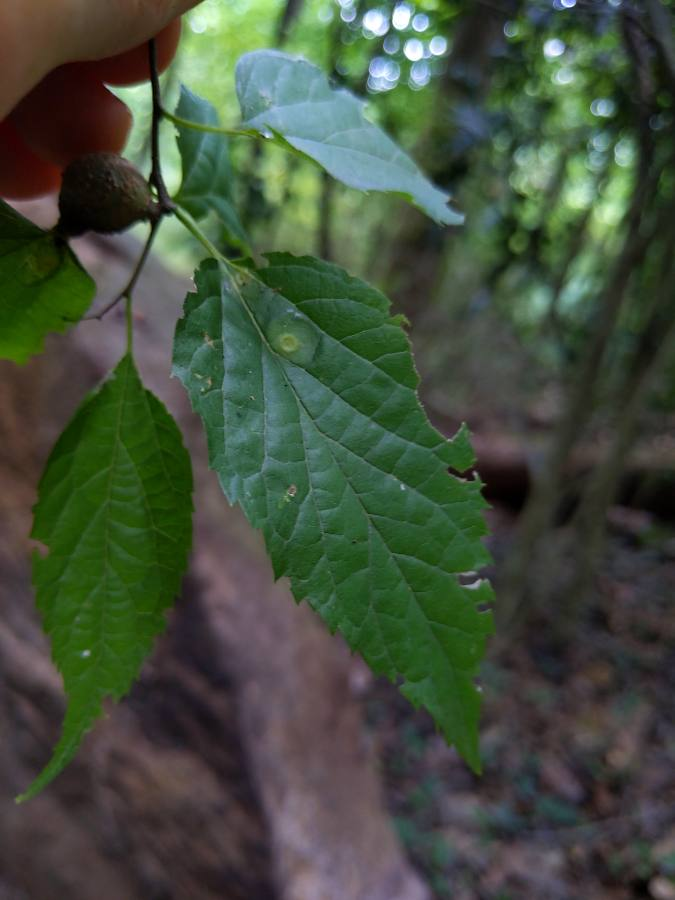
Leaf

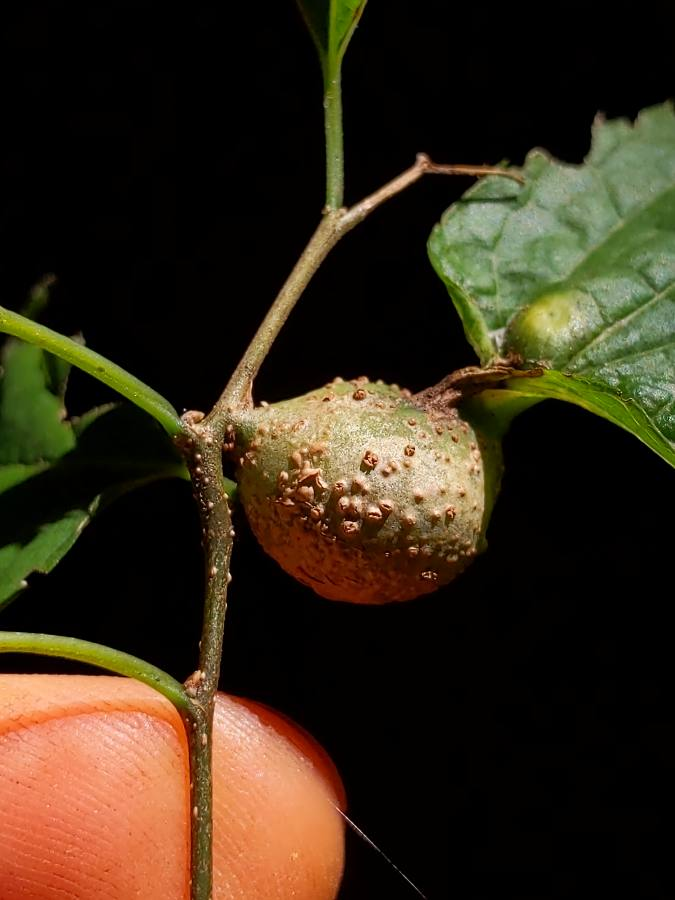
Gall
