= Buttonbush =

Buttonbush is a common name for several plants and may refer to:

- Cephalanthus, a genus of shrubs or small trees in the madder family, Rubiaceae, especially:
  - Cephalanthus occidentalis, the common Cephalanthus species in eastern North America
  - Cephalanthus salicifolius, Mexican buttonbush, in western North America
- Conocarpus, a genus of two species of dense multiple-trunked shrubs or small to medium-sized trees in the family Combretaceae, native to tropical regions

== See also ==
- Ledaea perditalis, the buttonbush owlet moth
- Buttonwood, disambiguation page
