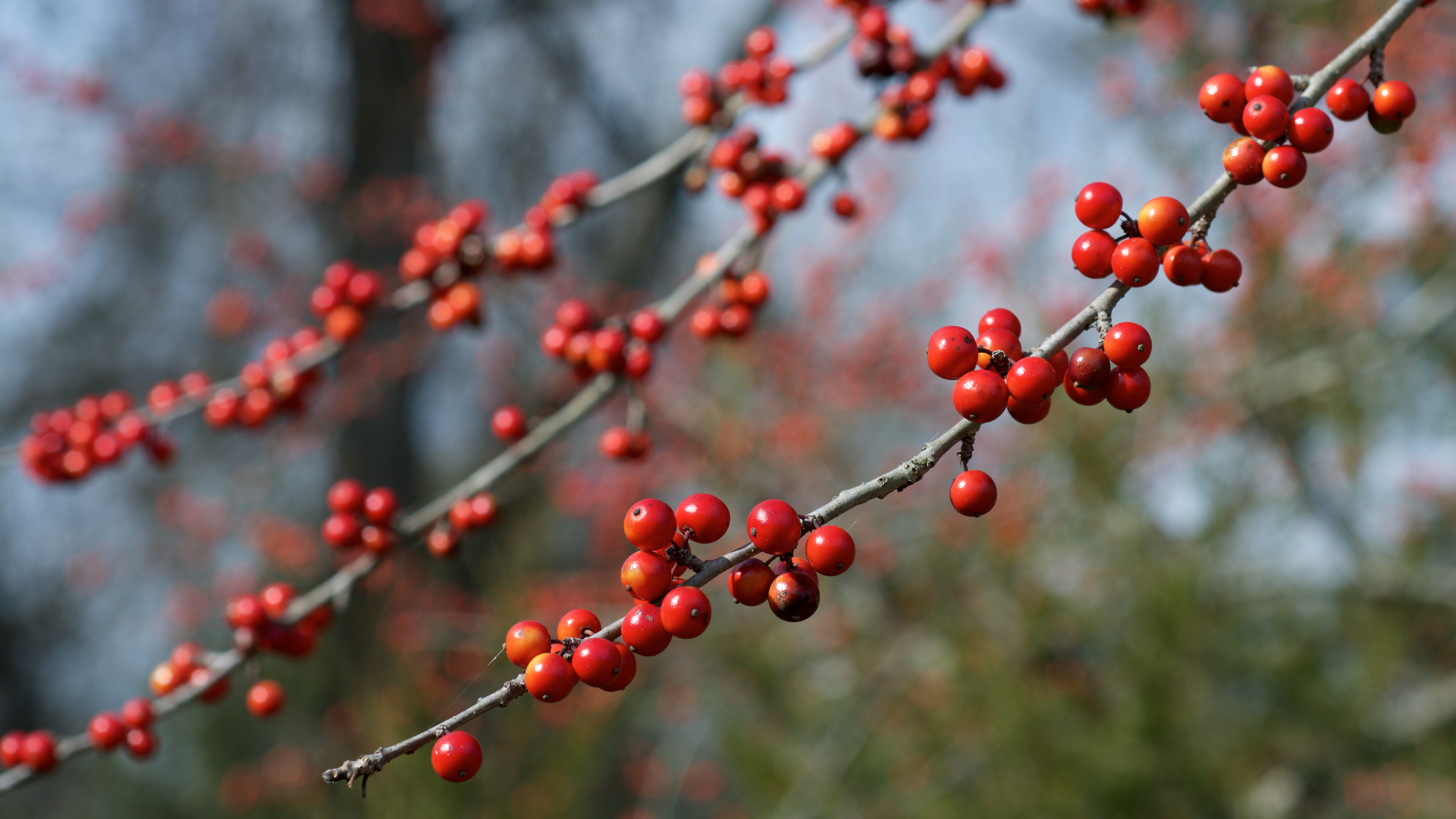

Conservation status
- Least Concern (IUCN 3.1)

Scientific classification
- Kingdom: Plantae
- Clade: Tracheophytes
- Clade: Angiosperms
- Clade: Eudicots
- Clade: Asterids
- Order: Aquifoliales
- Family: Aquifoliaceae
- Genus: Ilex
- Species: I. decidua

Binomial name
- Ilex decidua Walter
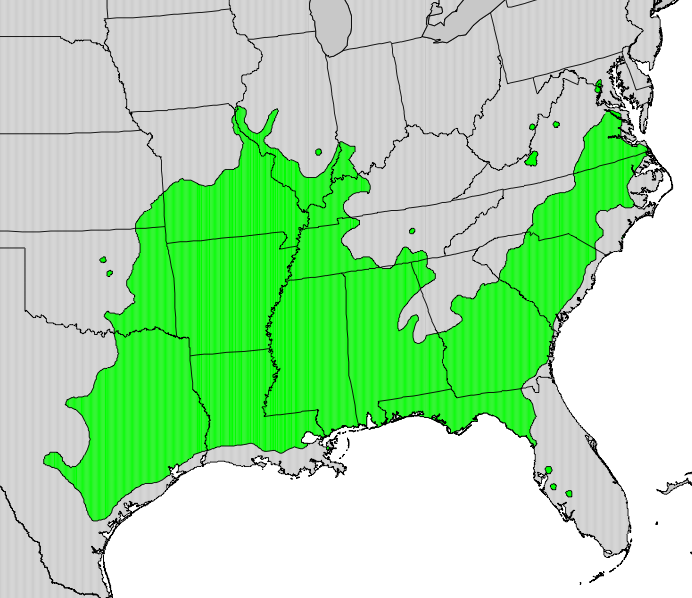

Synonyms
- Ilex curtissii (Fern.) Small; Ilex decidua Walter var. curtissii Fern.

= Ilex decidua =

Species of holly

Ilex decidua (meadow holly, also called "possumhaw", "deciduous holly" or "swamp holly") is a species of holly native to the United States.

== Description ==
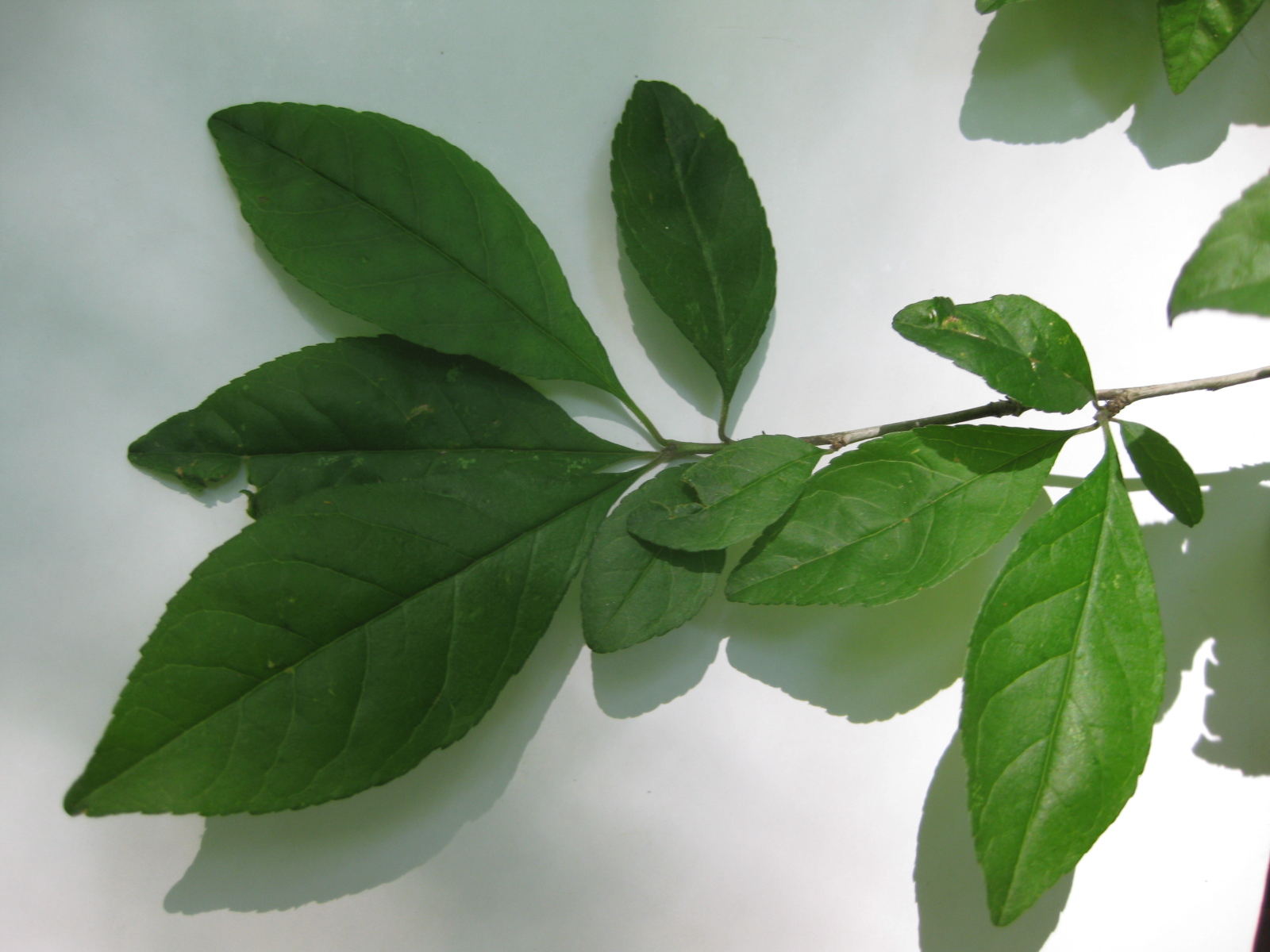
Leaves of Ilex decidua

This is an upright shrub or small tree that is typically between 10 and 15 feet at maturity though it may grow larger provided partial shade. I. decidua grows many thin trunks and stems in a clumping fashion If left un-managed it will develop a large spreading mound of foliage up to 30' in the wild. Bark is "light brown to gray" in color and may be smooth or "warty and roughened". Slender twigs are glabrous and silvery gray, with numerous spur shoots, pointed lateral buds, and acuminate scales.

Distinguishing features of this species are crenate leaf margins and fruiting pedicels that are 2–8 mm long. Its "distinctive leaf shape... is less variable than other species of holly". Leaves are obovate, simple, alternating, and grow to 2.5-7.5 cm long. Although the plant is deciduous, its dark green leaves do not present any appreciable fall color change prior to dropping.

From March to May small white flowers bloom among the leaves which produce small Drupe fruits ripening in early autumn. Fruits are red (or rarely yellow), shiny, and globose (spherical, or nearly so), with a diameter of 4–8 mm. Following leaf drop, fruits persist on the tree throughout the winter producing a showy winter sight against the bare branches. While they have reached maturity by autumn, producing 3-5 seeds each, it is not until the spring, after they've been exposed to freezing and thawing, that the bitter fruits become a favorite food source of many birds and mammals.

== Distribution and ecology ==
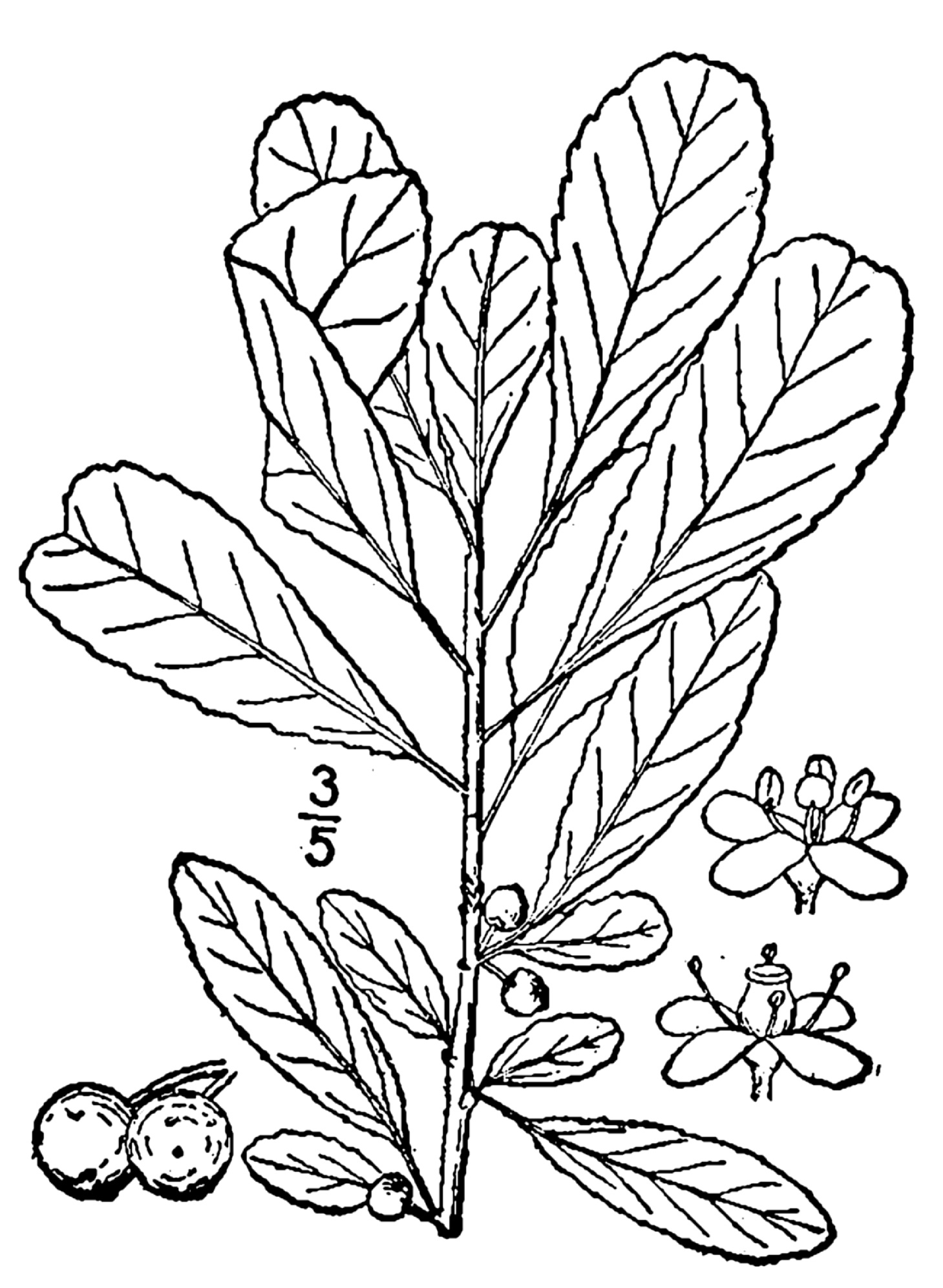
Drawing of Ilex decidua

Ilex decidua is a common plant, growing in the US in Alabama, Arkansas, Washington, D.C., Florida, Georgia, Illinois, Indiana, Kansas, Kentucky, Louisiana, Maryland, Missouri, Mississippi, North Carolina, Oklahoma, South Carolina, Tennessee, Texas, and Virginia. It also grows in the northern Mexico states of Chihuahua and Coahuila.

It prefers land in floodplains and the margins of swamps or lakes, and grows at elevations up to about 360 m. It can often be found on limestone glades and bluffs, along streams in wet woods, and in lowland valleys, sloughs and swamps. Other plant species with which possumhaw is associated include water tupelo (Nyssa aquatica), overcup oak (Quercus lyrata), bald cypress (Taxodium distichum), sycamore (Platanus occidentalis), and hackberry (Celtis spp.).

The fruits attract songbirds and small mammals. Bobwhite quail also feed on the fruit. Deer browse on young twigs.

== Cultivation and uses ==
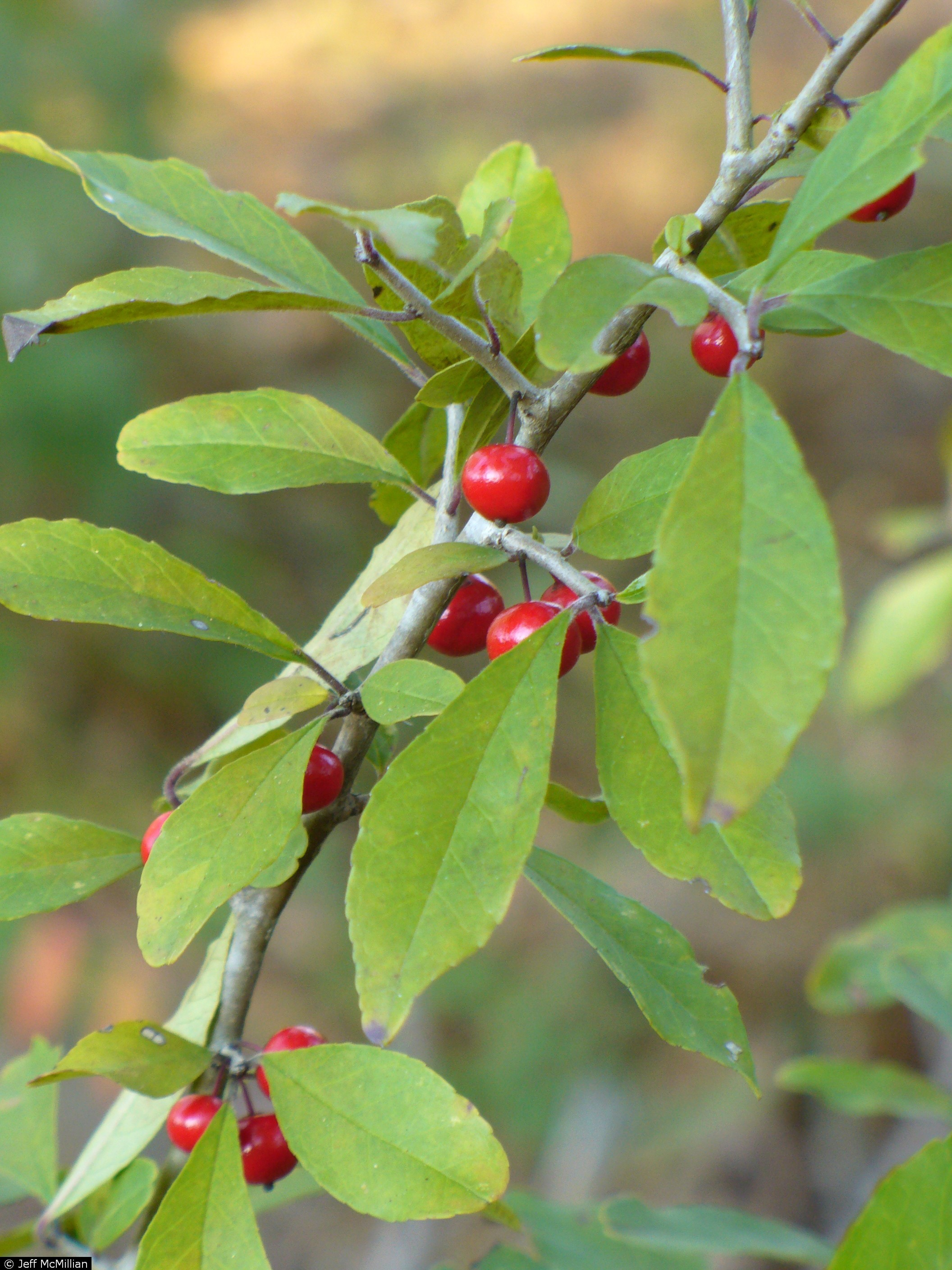
Ilex decidua with red "berries"

The growth habit of I. decidua lends it to various ornamental and functional uses in its native regions. The thick trunks and stems allow this plant to serve as an effective screen if desired. The lower branches can also be removed to form a more tidy small tree with a tight head of foliage at the crown. This plant can be used ornamentally as a shrub or small tree in varied landscape uses and is well suited to backyard gardens. As possumhaw tolerates wet soil and is often found wild in wet woods, it is also an excellent candidate to stabilise stream beds or for the banks of water retention ponds. Arborists may recommend this plant for parking lot buffer strips and islands, highway median strip plantings, or near decks and patios.

Because of its attractive "berries", this tree is often used as a winter ornamental plant and branches may be collected for use as Christmas decorations. The Audubon society specifically included I. decidua among their recommendations for bird-safe outdoor holiday decorations.

Possumhaw wood is not considered to be commercially useful because of the tree's small size.

== Selected cultivars ==
=== Fruit bearing (Requires a pollinator) ===
- Ilex decidua 'Byer's Golden'- Yellow Fruit
- Ilex decidua 'Council Fire'- persistent orange-red fruit well into the winter
- Ilex decidua 'Pendula'
- Ilex decidua 'Pocahontas' - Vigorous growth with very glossy bright red fruit and broader leaves which defoliate earlier
- Ilex decidua 'Sentry' - Unique narrow columnar growth habit averaging 20 feet potentially well suited for planting in highway medians.
- Ilex decidua 'Sundance' - Average 7 feet height with orange-red fruits
- Ilex decidua 'Red Cascade' - Many large red fruits which remain attractive until plant is again in full leaf
- Ilex decidua 'Warren's Red'- Glossy bright red fruit in such abundance that the branches are arched. Silvery bark and dark green leaves throughout much of the season

=== Pollinators (No Fruit) ===
- IIlex decidua 'Red Escort' - Unique male pollinator which resembles 'Warren's Red'
- Fruit bearing IIlex decidua cultivars can also be pollinated by any Ilex opaca pollinators
