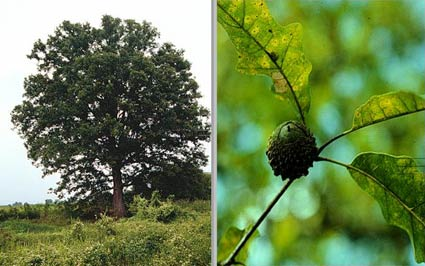

Conservation status
- Least Concern (IUCN 3.1)

- Secure (NatureServe)

Scientific classification
- Kingdom: Plantae
- Clade: Embryophytes
- Clade: Tracheophytes
- Clade: Angiosperms
- Clade: Eudicots
- Clade: Rosids
- Order: Fagales
- Family: Fagaceae
- Genus: Quercus
- Subgenus: Quercus subg. Quercus
- Section: Quercus sect. Quercus
- Species: Q. lyrata

Binomial name
- Quercus lyrata Walter
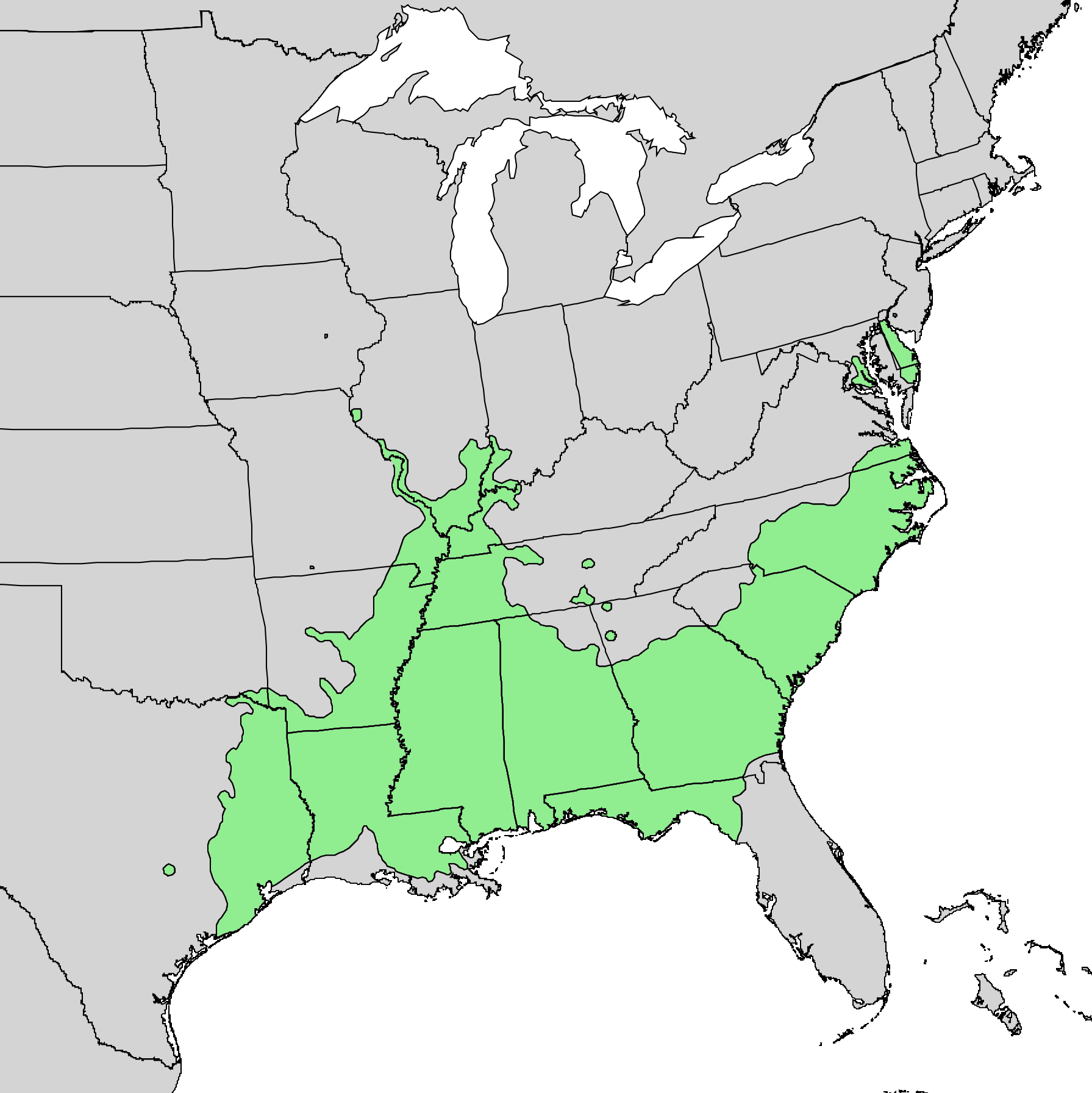

Synonyms
- Quercus bicolor var. lyrata (Walter) Dippel; Scolodrys lyrata (Walter) Raf.

= Quercus lyrata =

Overcup oak

Species of oak tree

Quercus lyrata, the overcup oak, is an oak in the white oak group (Quercus sect. Quercus). The common name, overcup oak, refers to its acorns that are mostly enclosed within the acorn cup. It is native to lowland wetlands in the eastern and south-central United States, in all the coastal states from New Jersey to Texas, inland as far as Oklahoma, Missouri, and Illinois. There are historical reports of it growing in Iowa, but the species appears to have been extirpated there. It is a slow-growing tree that often takes 25 to 30 years to mature. It has an estimated lifespan of 400 years.

== Description ==
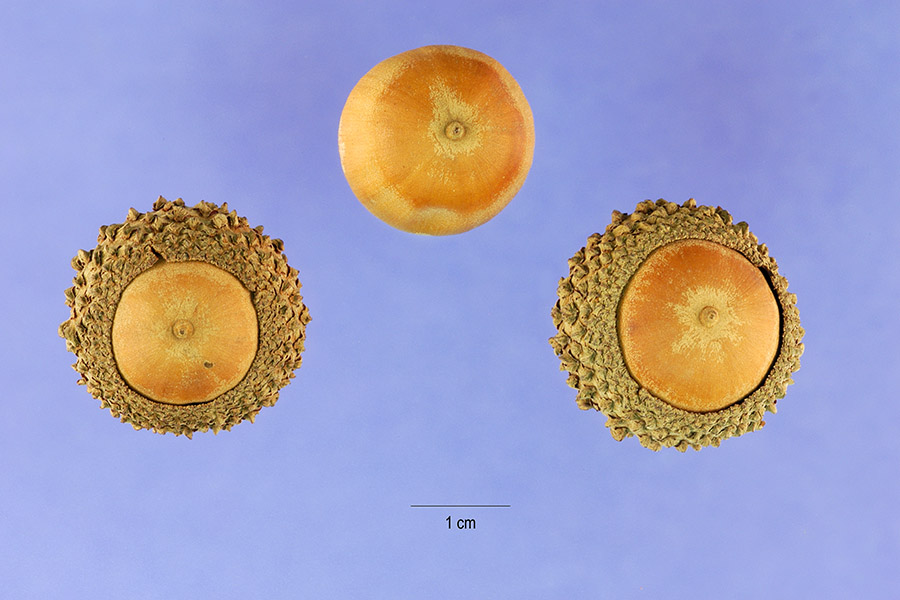
Overcup oak acorns, showing the nut largely enclosed by the acorn cup

Quercus lyrata is a medium to large-sized deciduous tree, growing as tall as 47 meters (154 feet), with an average height of 24 m (79 ft). The trunk averages up to 80 centimetres (31 inches) in diameter, or rarely to 140 cm (55 in). It is a slow-growing tree that often takes 25 to 30 years to mature.

Quercus lyrata has simple leaves that are alternately arranged. On average, the leaves are 15 to 20 cm (6 to 8 in) inches long. They are broad, deeply lobed, and somewhat lyre-shaped (lyrate). Leaves have a leathery feel. They are dark green and shiny on the top while the underside is a paler gray-green with fine hairs. In autumn, leaf color varies between red, yellow, and brown. Like other oak trees, the overcup oak has clustered terminal buds.

The bark is light to dark gray in color with irregular bark plates. Its bark plates are deeply ridged and furrowed.

Quercus lyrata has male and female flowers. The male flowers, often brown or yellow in color, form in a drooping, elongated cluster. Female flowers appear as individual reddish spikes with surrounding leaves.

The fruit is an acorn. They are generally oval or oblong in shape, ranging from 13 to 25 millimetres (1/2 to 1 in) in length. The acorn contributes to the overcup oak's common name. The acorns are almost entirely covered by their cup, hence the name overcup. The cup has gray, pubescent scales. The acorns also have a unique spongy shell that make them buoyant. The pericarp of overcup oak acorns is unusually large for oaks and makes up 50% of acorn mass. The pericarp only makes up 30% of mass in other oak trees.

=== Phenology ===
Quercus lyrata is monecious, producing female and male flowers. Female and male flowers begin to appear in mid-spring around April or May. The male flowers form in a drooping, elongated cluster. They are often brown or yellow in color. Female flowers appear as individual reddish spikes with surrounding leaves. The flowers are catkins, maturing in about 6–7 months into acorns 2.5–5 cm (1–2 in) long and 2–4 cm (3/4–1 1/2 in) broad. Acorns are most often distributed by water due to their buoyancy and preferred habitat. Acorns germinate best in moist soils and when covered with leaf litter.

== Taxonomy ==
Quercus lyrata was first described in 1788 by Thomas Walter, a British born American botanist. It has two synonyms: Quercus bicolor and Scolodrys lyrata. The word "Quercus" is of Celtic origin and means "beautiful tree." The species name "lyrata" comes from the word lyrate. This refers to its lyre-shaped leaves.

== Distribution and habitat ==
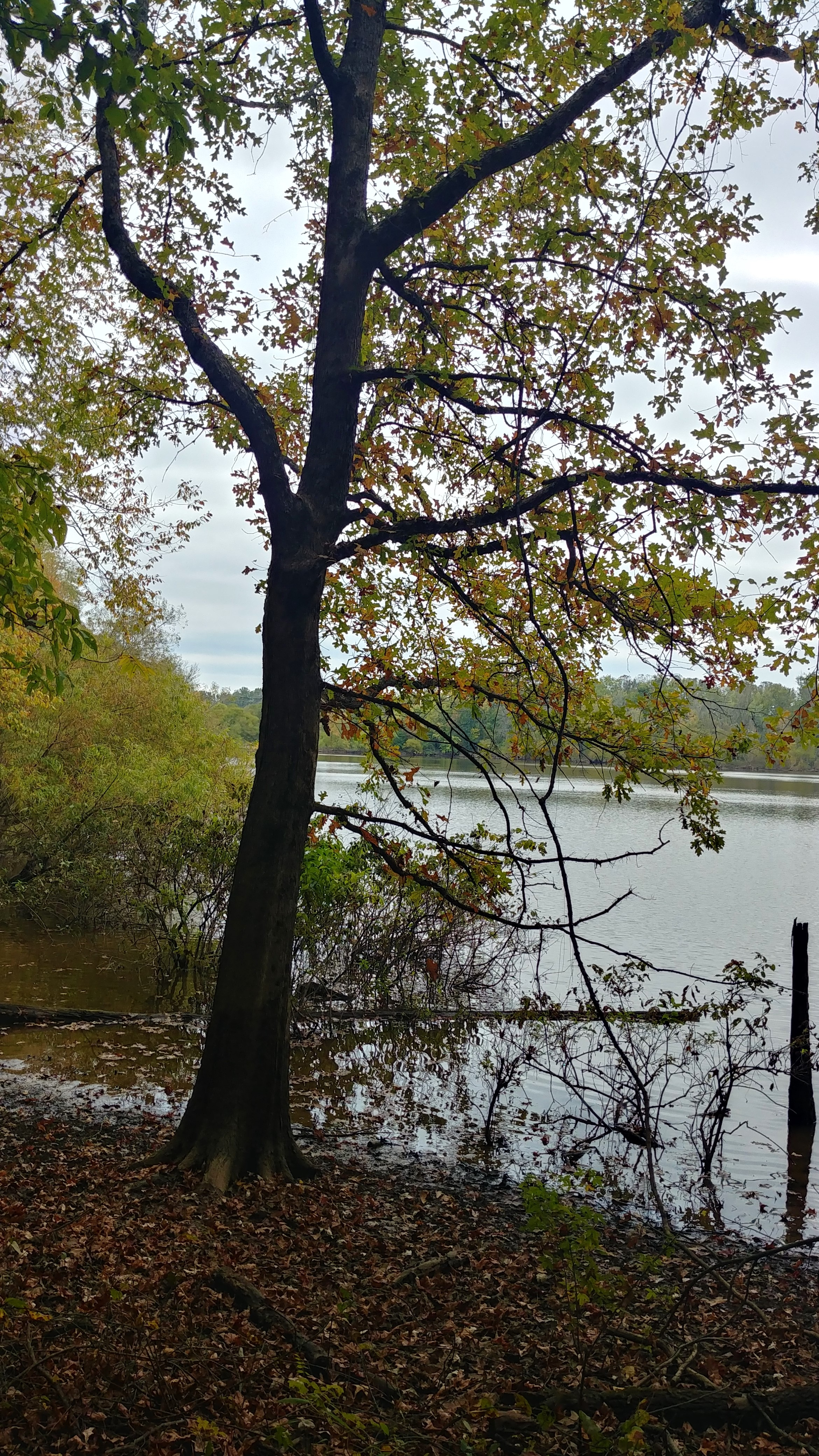
An overcup oak at the York Hill Yadkin River access in Linwood, North Carolina

Quercus lyrata has an extensive range that extends across the central and eastern United States. It is in all the coastal states from New Jersey to Texas, inland as far as Oklahoma, Missouri, and Illinois. It is found in small populations in the states of Delaware, Tennessee, Maryland, and Alabama. There are historical reports of it growing in Iowa, but the species appears to have been extirpated there. The overcup oak is also considered to be endangered in New Jersey.

The species is most often found along floodplains, wetlands, and swamps. It prefers clay type soils, generally low lying clay or silty clay. It has adapted to survive in areas that are poorly drained and have large amounts of flooding. It can withstand continuous flooding for two or more growing seasons.

== Ecology ==
The overcup oak is one of the dominant species within an oak–water hickory forest and can often be associated with Quercus phellos (willow oak), Ulmus americana (American elm), Fraxinus pennsylvanica (green ash), Carya aquatica (water hickory), and Acer rubrum (red maple). Q. lyrata is not considered a dominant species in many other types of forest ecosystems.

The species is known to provide both food and habitat to a range of wildlife. Its acorns can be eaten by small mammals and birds such as squirrels and wild turkeys. The tree is considered to be somewhat deer-resistant, however, white-tail deer also eat its acorns. It also helps provide canopy cover and habitat for many species. Like many oaks, Q. Lyrata provides habitat to a variety of Lepidoptera including Eacles imperialis (imperial moth), Satyrium calanus (Banded Hairstreak), Satyrium edwardsii (Edward's Hairstreak), Strymon melinus (Gray hairstreak), Parrhasius m-album (White M Hairstreak), Erynnis horatius (Horace's Duskywing ), and Erynnis juvenalis (Juvenal's Duskywing).

=== Threats ===
Pests that impact Q. lyrata include Bucculatrix ainsliella (oak skeletonizer), Corythucha arcuata (oak lace bug), Curculio nucum (nut weevil), and Leaf miners.

Like many other oaks, Q. lyrata is susceptible to a high number of plant diseases such as chestnut blight, armillaria root rot, oak leaf blister, and powdery mildew. This species is resistant to oak wilt.

== Conservation ==
The International Union for Conservation of Nature (IUCN) has classified Q. lyrata as least concern. However, according to the United States Department of Agriculture, it is considered endangered in New Jersey. There has been no comprehensive study on the species' population size due to its expansive range and assumed vast population.

Quercus lyrata is expected to be impacted by climate change. It is expected to lose over 40% of its suitable habitat by 2050. This extent of habitat loss could cause Q. lyrata to be reclassified by the IUCN as near-threatened or threatened. However, there are varying projections on how climate change will effect the species.

== Uses ==
The wood is considered less valuable than that of other white oaks. This is due to its relatively high susceptibility to injury and disease. However, it can be used for lumber and cooperage. It is not often used to make quality products such as furniture. It can be used as firewood. Its acorns are eaten by birds and mammals, but are a low severity poison to humans. The tree can also be planted as an ornamental.
