= Louisiana Department of Wildlife and Fisheries =

US state government agency

The Louisiana Department of Wildlife and Fisheries (LDWF) is a state agency of Louisiana that maintains state wildlife and fishery areas. The agency is headquartered in the capital city of Baton Rouge.

== Mission ==
The Louisiana Department of Wildlife and Fisheries is assigned the responsibility of managing, conserving, promoting, and supervision of Louisiana's renewable fish and wildlife resources and their supporting habitats, through the Constitution of the State of Louisiana of 1974 Article IX, Section 7 and in revised statutes under Title 36 and Title 56.

== History ==
The LDWF was formerly known as the Louisiana Wild Life and Fisheries Commission.

== Programs ==
=== Waterfowl Program ===
The LDWF participates in the Waterfowl Program that includes waterfowl-wetlands management, research, and monitoring. Two biologists coordinate the program, the Waterfowl Study Leader and the North American Waterfowl Management Plan (NAWMP). The program offers technical assistance to improve wetland habitat on both public and private land that includes providing food for wintering geese and ducks, nest sites, brooding habitat, for breeding wood ducks. Biologists form the Mississippi Flyway Council Technical Committee collects technical data used to set annual waterfowl hunting regulations.

=== HIP ===
Louisiana, as well as all other states such as Texas, participate in the HIP Program. This is an acronym for Migratory Bird Harvest Information Program that is operated jointly by each state and the U.S. Fish and Wildlife Service (USFWS), for anyone wanting to hunt ducks, coots, geese, brant, swans, doves, band-tailed pigeons, woodcock, rails, snipe, sandhill cranes, or gallinules, all hunters must register, and the information is used to provide statistics on waterfowl harvesting in the US.

== Powers of search ==
State law grants broad powers to LDWF officers concerning any aspect of wildlife in the state. Officers have a right to visit, inspect records and search, with or without a search warrant, "any cold storage plant, warehouse, boat, store, car, conveyance, automobile or other vehicle, airplane or other aircraft, basket or other receptacle, or any place of deposit for wild birds, wild quadrupeds, fish, or other aquatic life or any parts thereof whenever there is probable cause to believe that a violation has occurred".

This includes "public restaurants, public and private markets, stores, and places where wild birds, game quadrupeds, fish, or other aquatic life or any parts thereof may be kept and offered for sale, for the purpose of ascertaining whether any laws or regulations under the jurisdiction of the department have been violated." This also includes inspecting commercial licenses required for retail and/or wholesale of commercial fish and bait fish.

The "search with or without warrant" provision, involving any wildlife with or without cause, extends to private property, even if fenced and posted with no trespassing signs, using the "open fields doctrine", per Hester v. United States and Oliver v. United States, and does not violate the Fourth Amendment to the United States Constitution or the Louisiana Constitution. The Second Circuit of the Court of Appeal of Louisiana concluded that there is no expectation of privacy where hunting and fishing are allowed, and agents can enter property without suspicion.

The "balancing test", the "promotion of legitimate governmental interests against the intrusion of the procedure" (authority for application is Johnson v. United States (2015)), was provided in Delaware v. Prouse, 440 U.S. 648 (1979). United States v. Greenhead, Inc., 256 F. Supp. 890 (N.D. Cal. 1966), affirms that agents can enter a locked gate, without any suspicion of criminal wrongdoing.

== Louisiana Wildlife and Fisheries Foundation ==
The Louisiana Wildlife and Fisheries Foundation (LWFF) was formed December 14, 1995, as a 501(C)(3) tax exempt nonprofit public charitable foundation. The purpose is to aid the LDWF in a broad range of areas, including financial support, in habitat conservation. The foundation receives no funding from the State of Louisiana or the LDWF so is dependent on contributions from private and corporate donations.

The Russell Sage Wildlife Management Area Wham Brake enhancement project (Wham Brake Hydrology Enhancement) was completed June 20, 2017. The project was a joint partnership between the LDWF, Ducks Unlimited (DU), LWFF, the Walker Foundation, Biedenharn Foundation, International Paper and other DU sponsors that support America's River Initiative. A North American Wetlands Conservation Act (NAWCA) grant of $1,000,000 was matched with partner contributions of $2,100,000 to improve 3,500 acres of wetland habitat with an impacted area of 8,547 acres.

== See also ==
- List of Louisiana Wildlife Management Areas
- The Derelict Crab Trap Program
- List of state and territorial fish and wildlife management agencies in the United States
