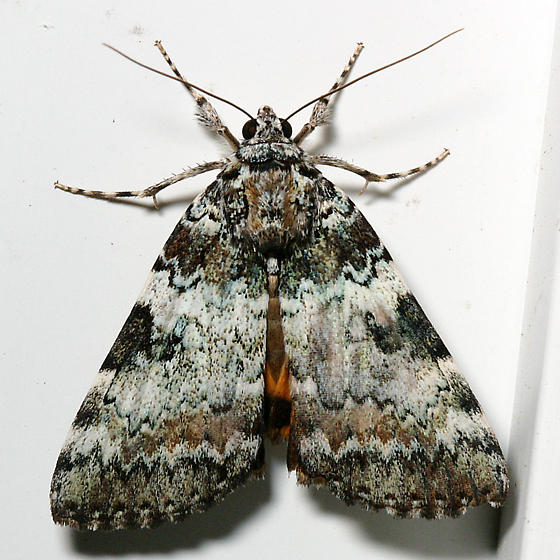

Scientific classification
- Kingdom: Animalia
- Phylum: Arthropoda
- Class: Insecta
- Order: Lepidoptera
- Superfamily: Noctuoidea
- Family: Erebidae
- Genus: Catocala
- Species: C. connubialis

Binomial name
- Catocala connubialis Guenée, 1852

Synonyms
- Catocala sancta Hulst, 1884; Ephesia connubialis; Catocala cordelia Edwards, 1880; Catocala connubialis f. pulverulenta Brower, 1940; Catocala amasia var. virens French, 1886

= Catocala connubialis =

Connubial underwing

Species of moth

Catocala connubialis, the connubial underwing, is a moth of the family Erebidae. The species was first described by Achille Guenée in 1852. It is found in North America from Ontario to Prince Edward Island (including Quebec, New Brunswick, and Nova Scotia), south to Florida and west to Texas, Oklahoma, and Missouri.

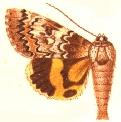
Illustration

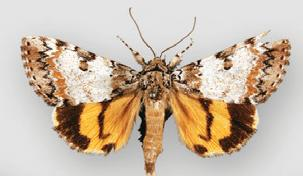
Lectotype of Catocala cordelia, now considered to be a synonym of Catocala connubialis

The wingspan is 37–47 mm. Adults are on wing from June to September depending on the location. There is probably one generation per year.

The larvae feed on Cephalanthus occidentalis, Melia azedarach, and Quercus rubra.
