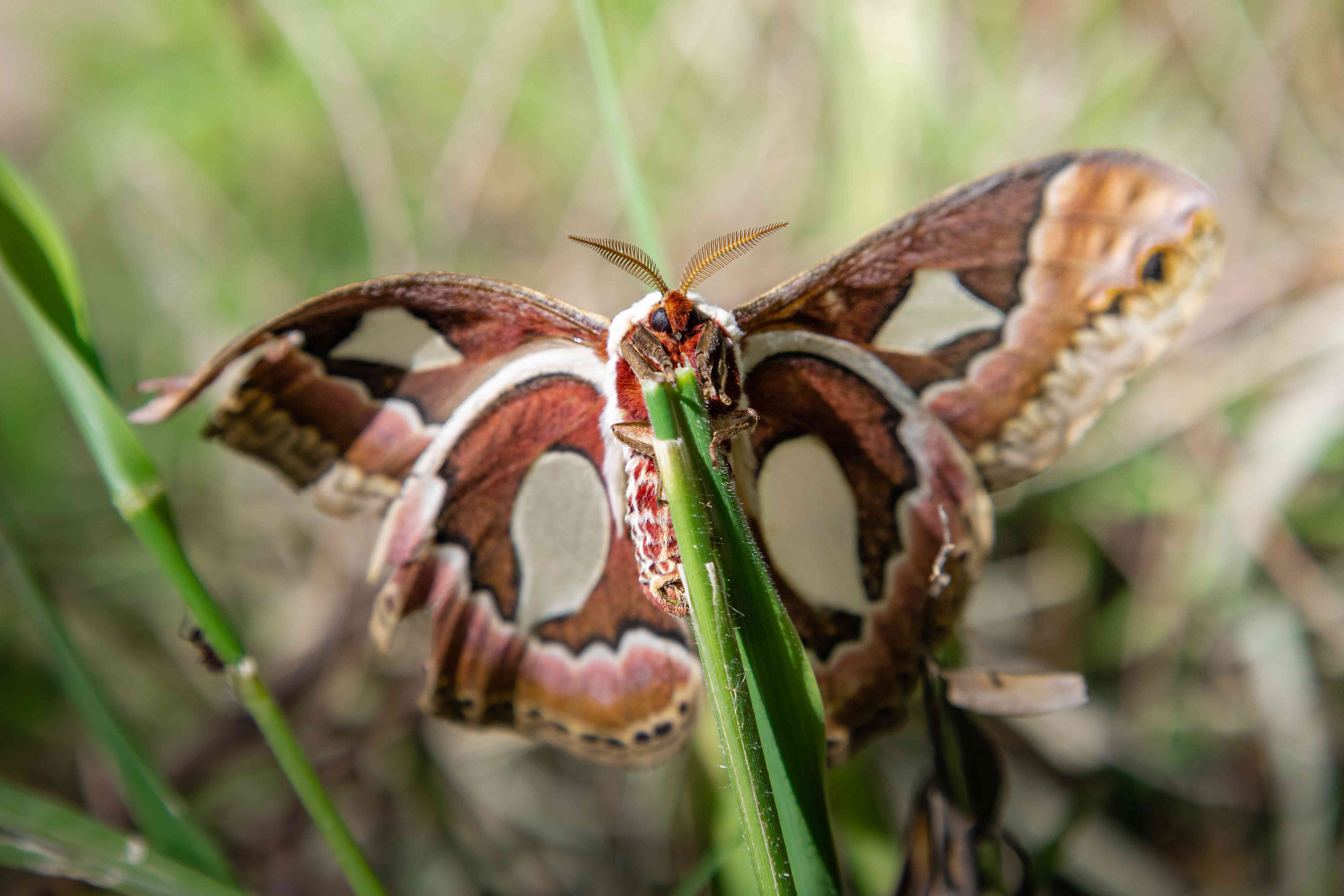

Scientific classification
- Kingdom: Animalia
- Phylum: Arthropoda
- Class: Insecta
- Order: Lepidoptera
- Family: Saturniidae
- Genus: Rothschildia
- Species: R. jacobaeae

Binomial name
- Rothschildia jacobaeae (Walker, 1855)

Synonyms
- Attacus jacobaeae Walker, 1855; Rothschildia jacobaea (lapsus); Rothschildia jacobeae (lapsus)

= Rothschildia jacobaeae =

Species of moth

Rothschildia jacobaeae (commonly known as the Brazilian silk moth) is a moth of the family Saturniidae first described by Francis Walker in 1855. It is endemic to Argentina and Brazil.

The wingspan is 80–100 mm.

The larvae feed on plants of several families, including species of Ilex paraguariensis, Jacaranda caroba, Jacaranda mimosifolia, Ligustrum spp., Ligustrum ovalifolium, Cephalanthus glabratus.
