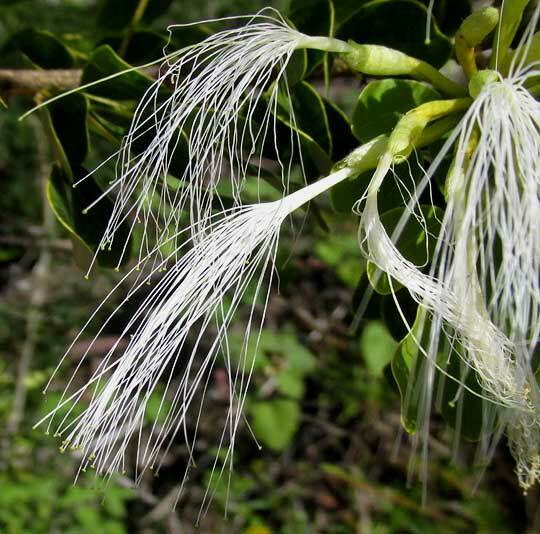
- Sphinga platyloba flowers

Scientific classification
- Kingdom: Plantae
- Clade: Tracheophytes
- Clade: Angiosperms
- Clade: Eudicots
- Clade: Rosids
- Order: Fabales
- Family: Fabaceae
- Subfamily: Caesalpinioideae
- Clade: Mimosoid clade
- Genus: Sphinga; Barneby & J.W.Grimes

= Sphinga =

Genus of legumes

The genus Sphinga comprises species belonging to the mimosoid clade of the subfamily Caesalpinioideae.

== Taxonomy ==
In 1875, George Bentham grouped the three currently recognized species of Sphinga into an informal division of his Pithecolobium sect. Ortholobium. In 1928, Nathaniel Lord Britton and Joseph Nelson Rose transferred the three species to the genus Havardia. In 1996, Rupert Charles Barneby and John W. Grimes proposed the new genus Sphinga for these three species, on the basis that they differed from Havardia in the greatly elongated perianth with a long, silky corolla opening at nightfall.

In 2017 Barneby and Grimes formally published the new genus.

As of September 2025, Plants of the World Online accepted three species:

- Sphinga acatlensis (Benth.) Barneby & J.W.Grimes
- Sphinga platyloba (Bertero ex DC.) Barneby & J.W.Grimes
- Sphinga prehensilis (C.Wright) Barneby & J.W.Grimes

== Etymology ==
The first part of the genus name Sphinga references the moth family Sphingidae, the sphinx moths, which some assume to be the pollinators of Sphinga species; then for the -inga in Sphinga the name-makers pivot to the Tupi language, where the vernacular name for several species in the Mimosoid clade is Sphinx inga.
