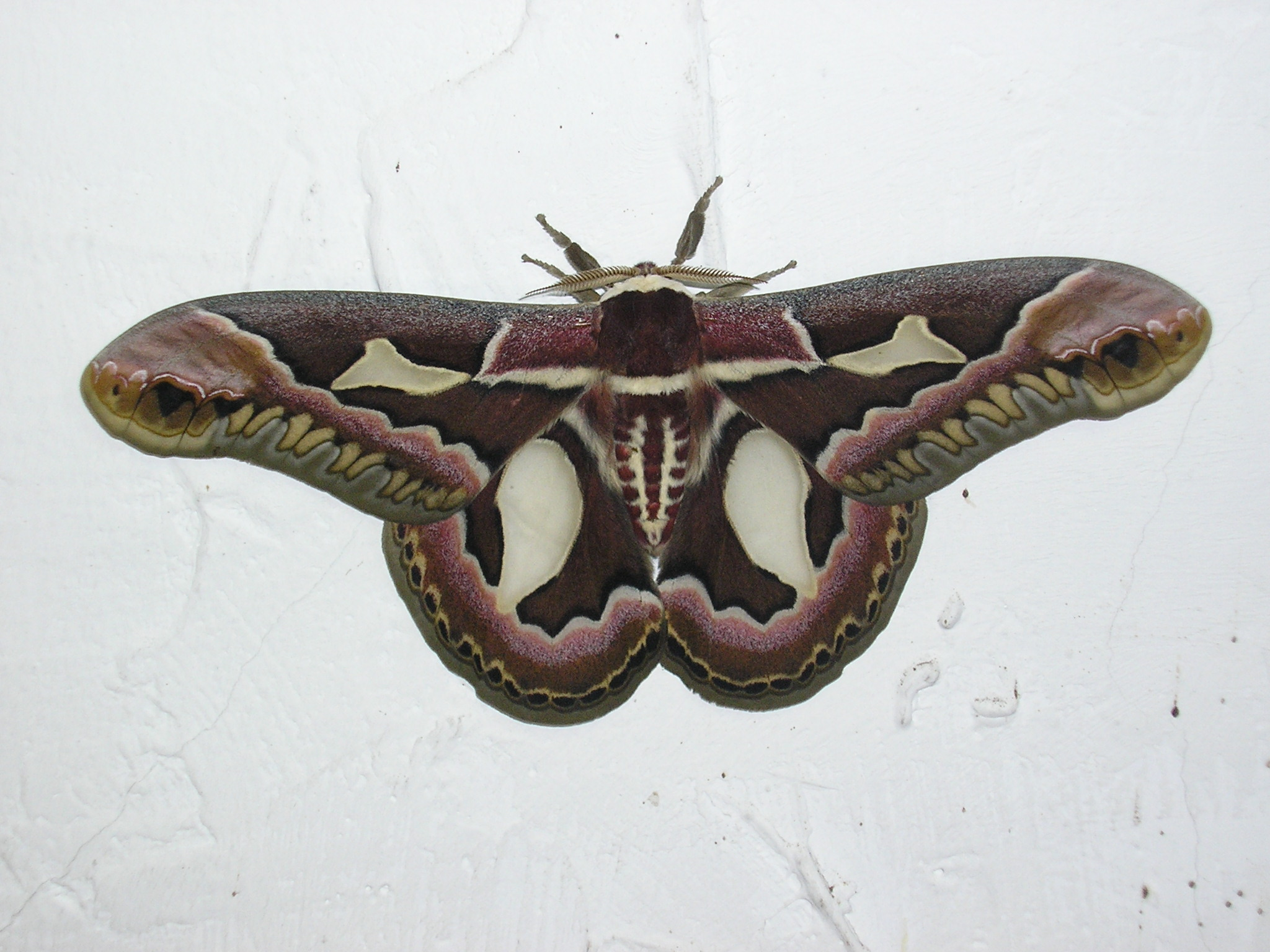
- Rothschildia jacobaeae, type species of the genus

Scientific classification
- Kingdom: Animalia
- Phylum: Arthropoda
- Clade: Pancrustacea
- Class: Insecta
- Order: Lepidoptera
- Family: Saturniidae
- Subfamily: Saturniinae
- Tribe: Attacini
- Genus: Rothschildia; Grote, 1896

= Rothschildia =

Genus of moths

Rothschildia is a genus of moths in the family Saturniidae first described by Augustus Radcliffe Grote in 1896.

Species are found in North America and South America from the United States to Argentina.

== Species ==
- Rothschildia amoena Jordan, 1911
- Rothschildia anikae Brechlin & Meister, 2010
- Rothschildia arethusa (Walker, 1855)
- Rothschildia aricia (Walker, 1855)
- Rothschildia aurota (Cramer, 1775)
- Rothschildia belus (Maassen, 1873)
- Rothschildia chiris W. Rothschild, 1907
- Rothschildia cincta (Tepper, 1883)
- Rothschildia condor (Staudinger, 1894)
- Rothschildia erycina (Shaw, 1796)
- Rothschildia forbesi Benjamin, 1934
- Rothschildia hesperus (Linnaeus, 1758)
- Rothschildia hopfferi (C. & R. Felder, 1859)
- Rothschildia interaricia Brechlin & Meister, 2010
- Rothschildia jacobaeae (Walker, 1855)
- Rothschildia jorulla (Westwood, 1854)
- Rothschildia jorulloides (Dognin, 1895)
- Rothschildia lebeau (Guerin-Meneville, 1868)
- Rothschildia maurus (Burmeister, 1879)
- Rothschildia orizaba (Westwood, 1854)
- Rothschildia paucidentata Lemaire, 1971
- Rothschildia prionia W. Rothschild, 1907
- Rothschildia renatae Lampe, 1985
- Rothschildia roxana Schaus, 1905
- Rothschildia schreiteriana Breyer & Orfila, 1945
- Rothschildia triloba W. Rothschild, 1907
- Rothschildia tucumani (Dognin, 1901)
- Rothschildia xanthina Rothschild, 1907
- Rothschildia zacateca (Westwood, 1854)

== Gallery ==
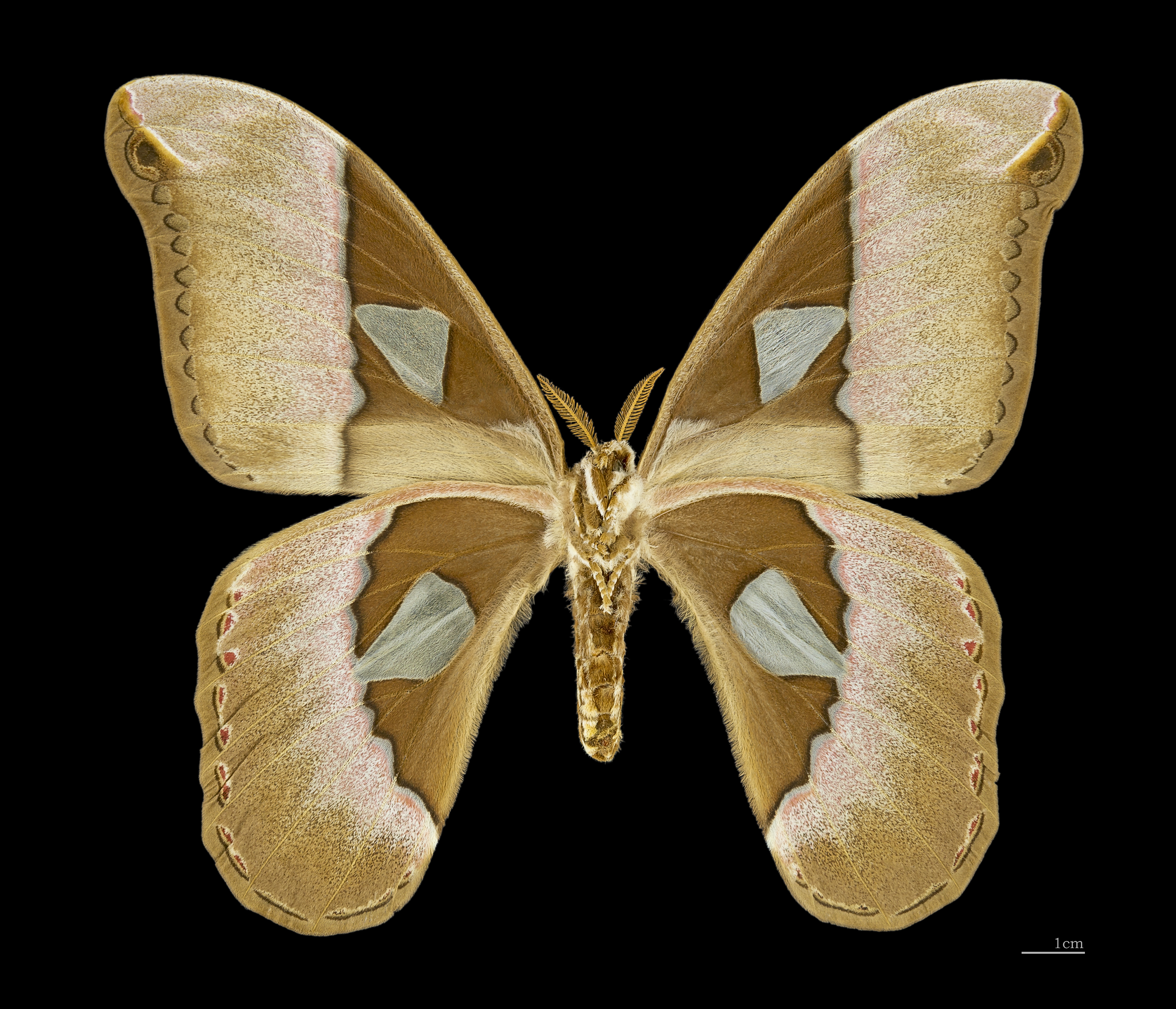
Rothschildia aurota - MHNT

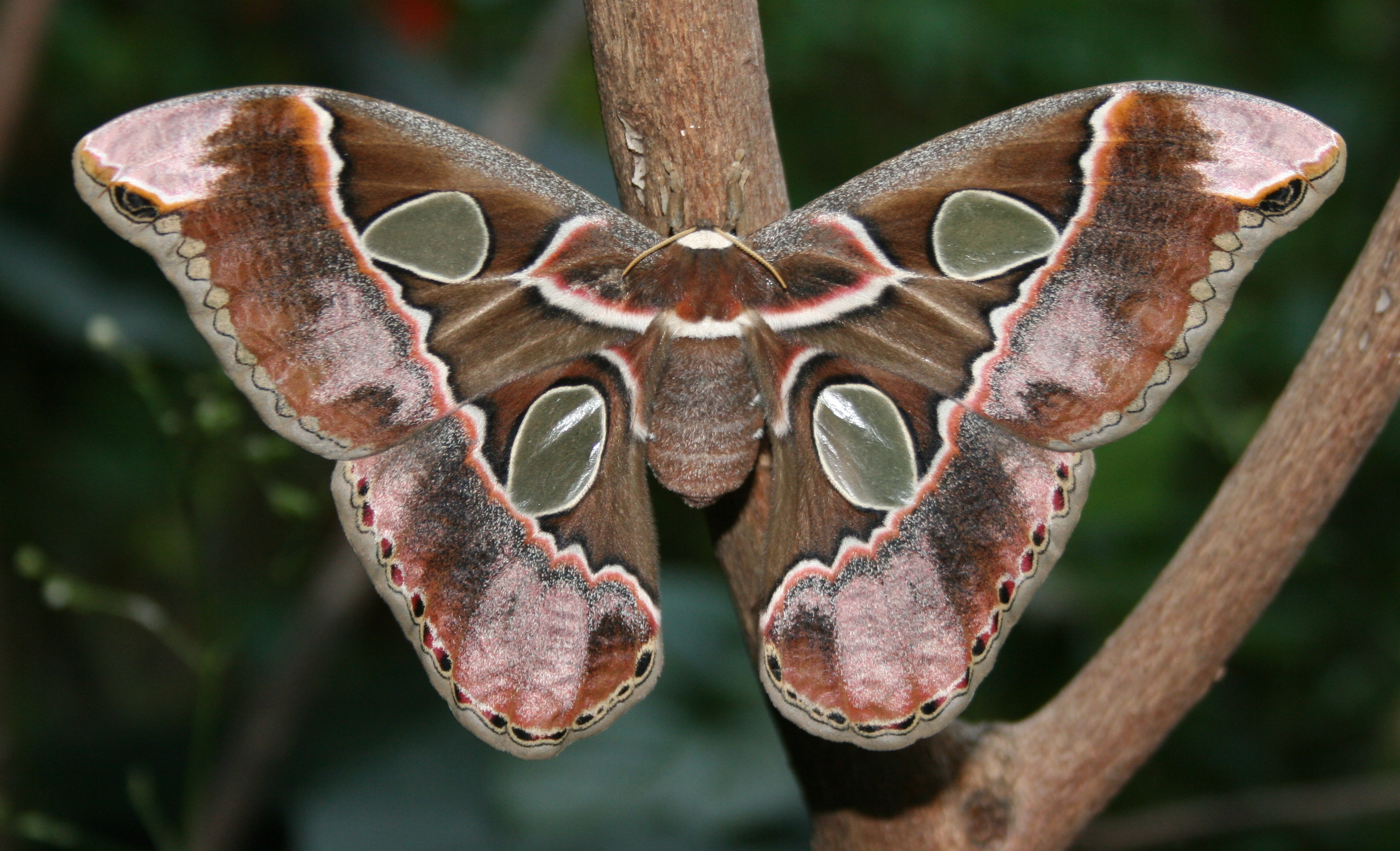
Rothschildia cincta

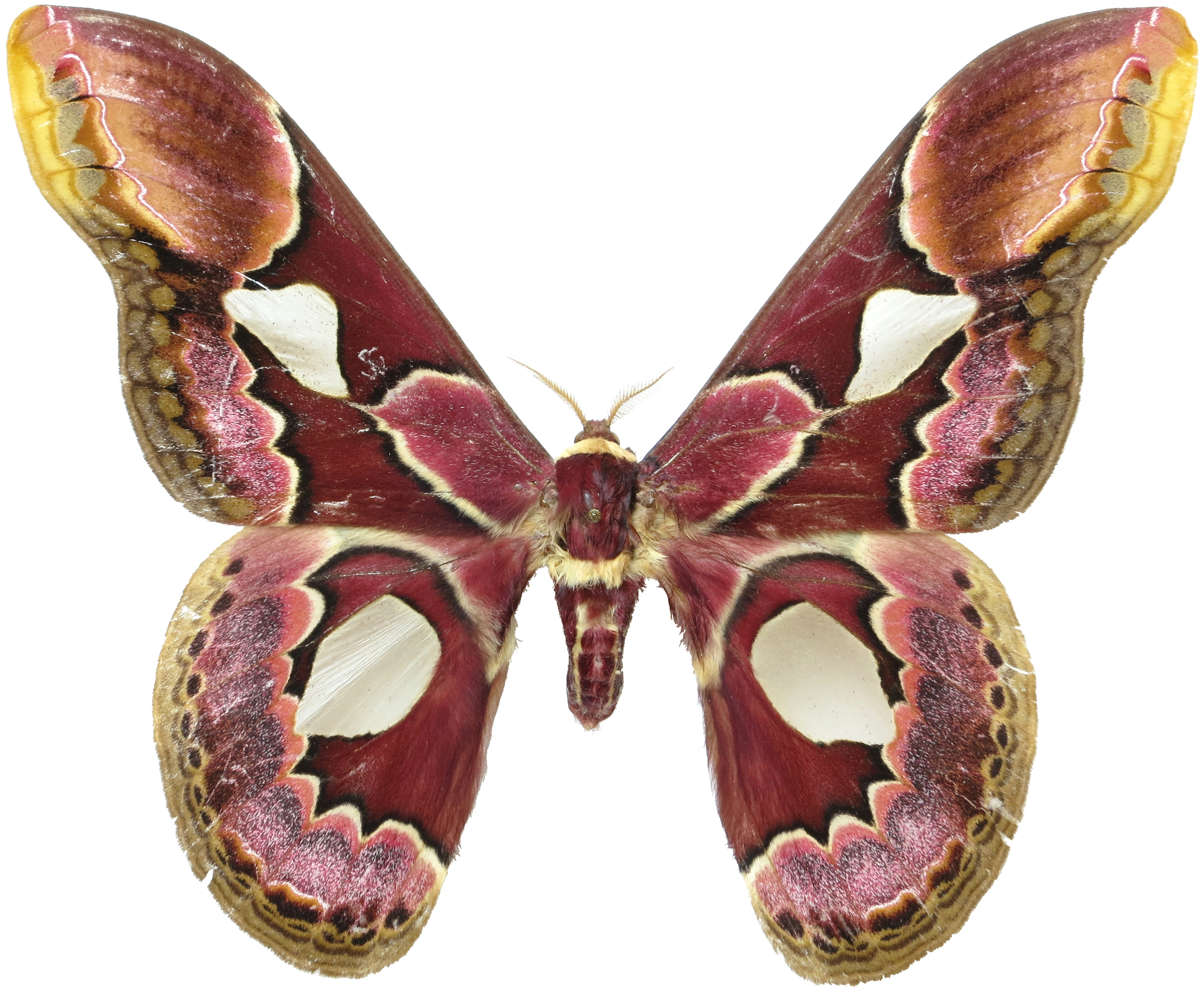
Rothschildia erycina

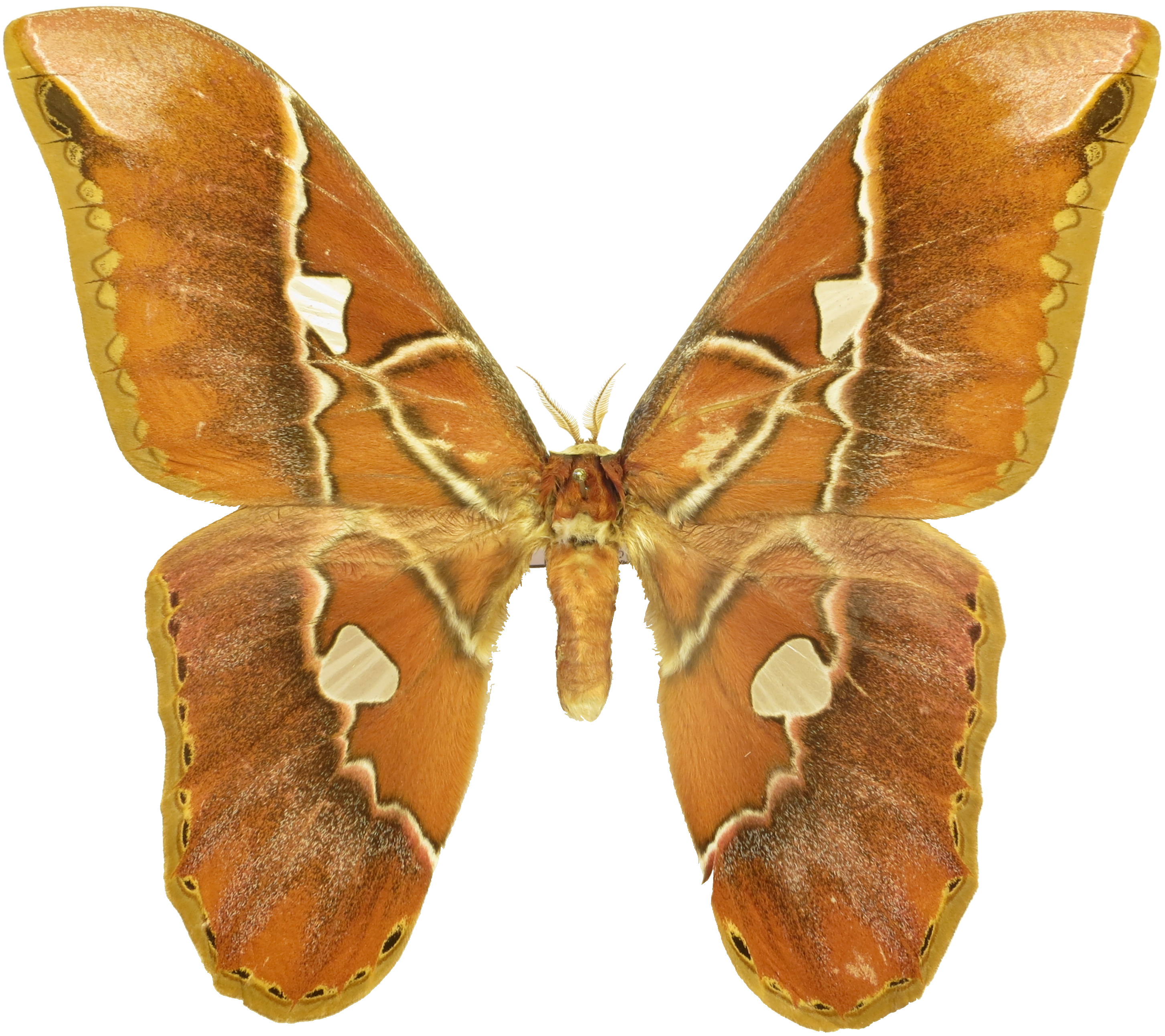
Rothschildia hesperus

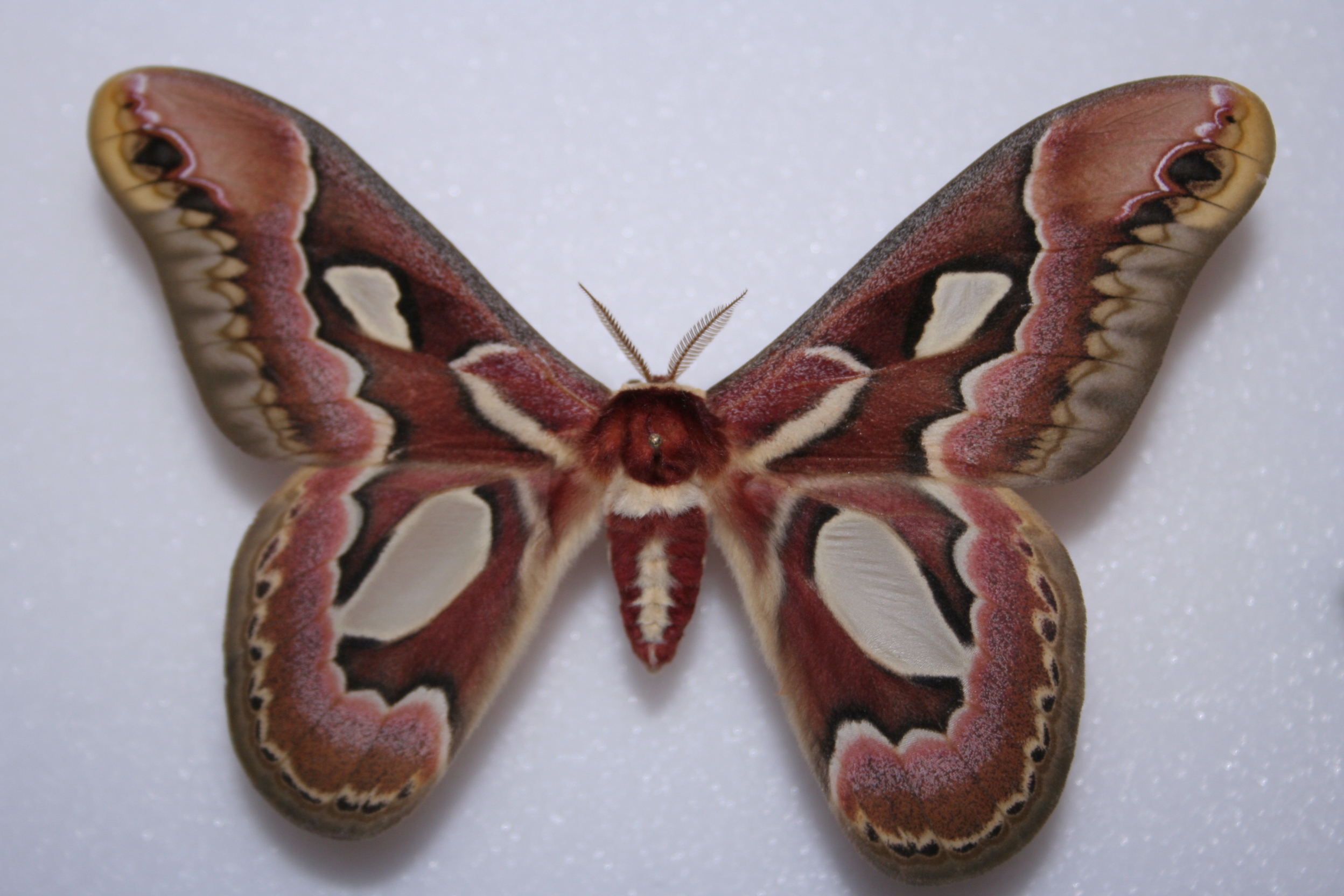
Rothschildia jacobaeae

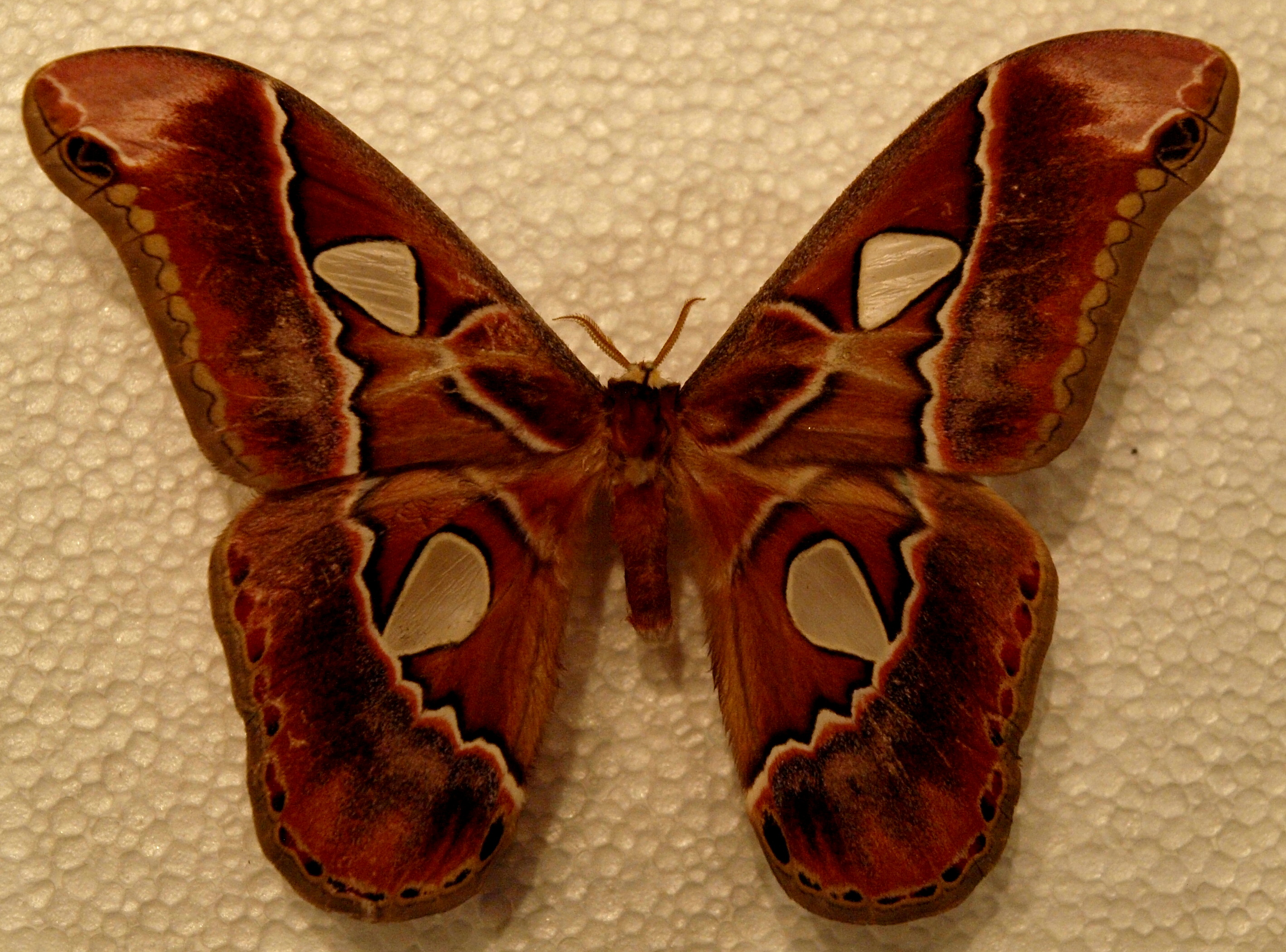
Rothschildia lebeau

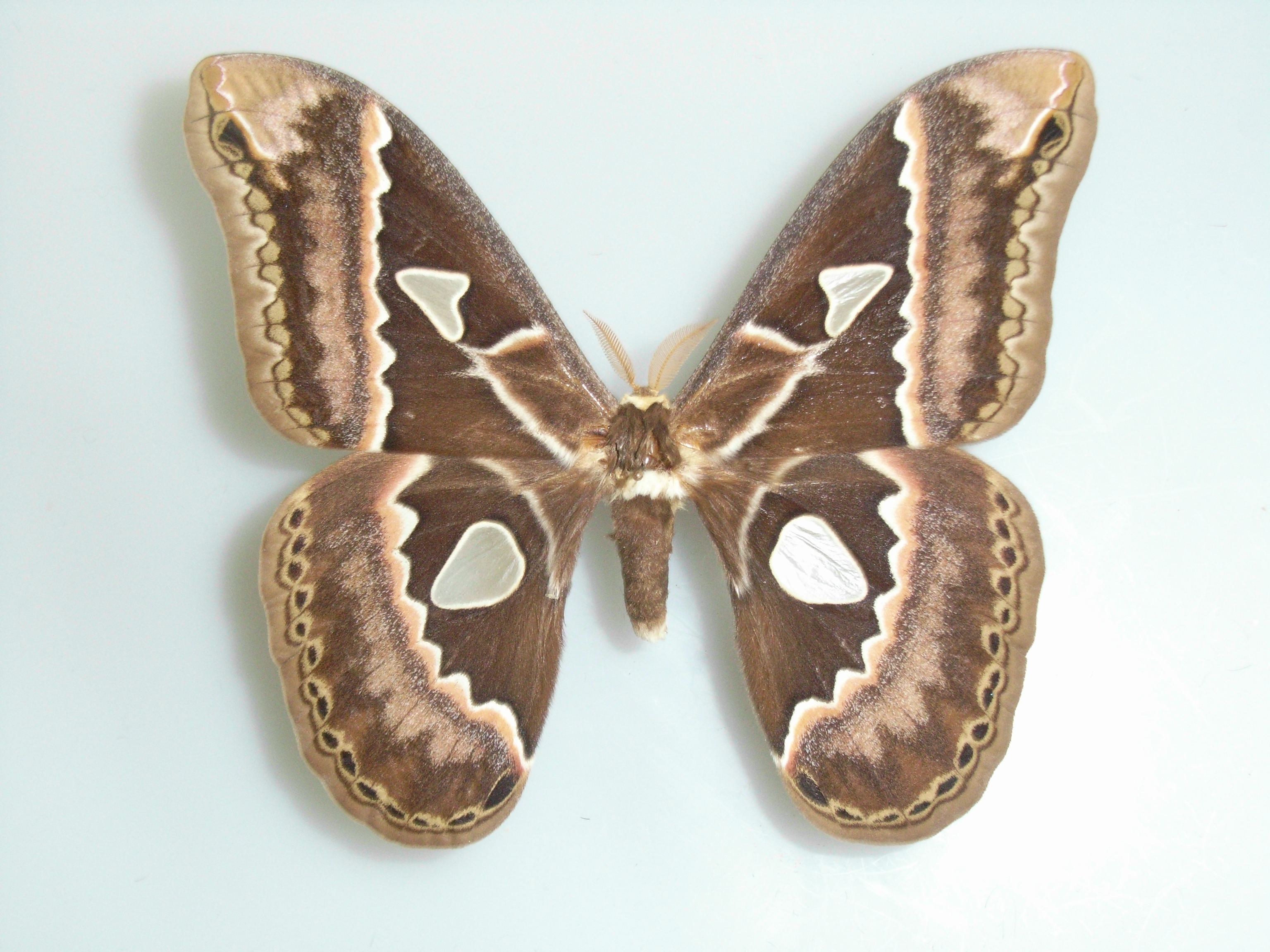
Rothschildia maurus
