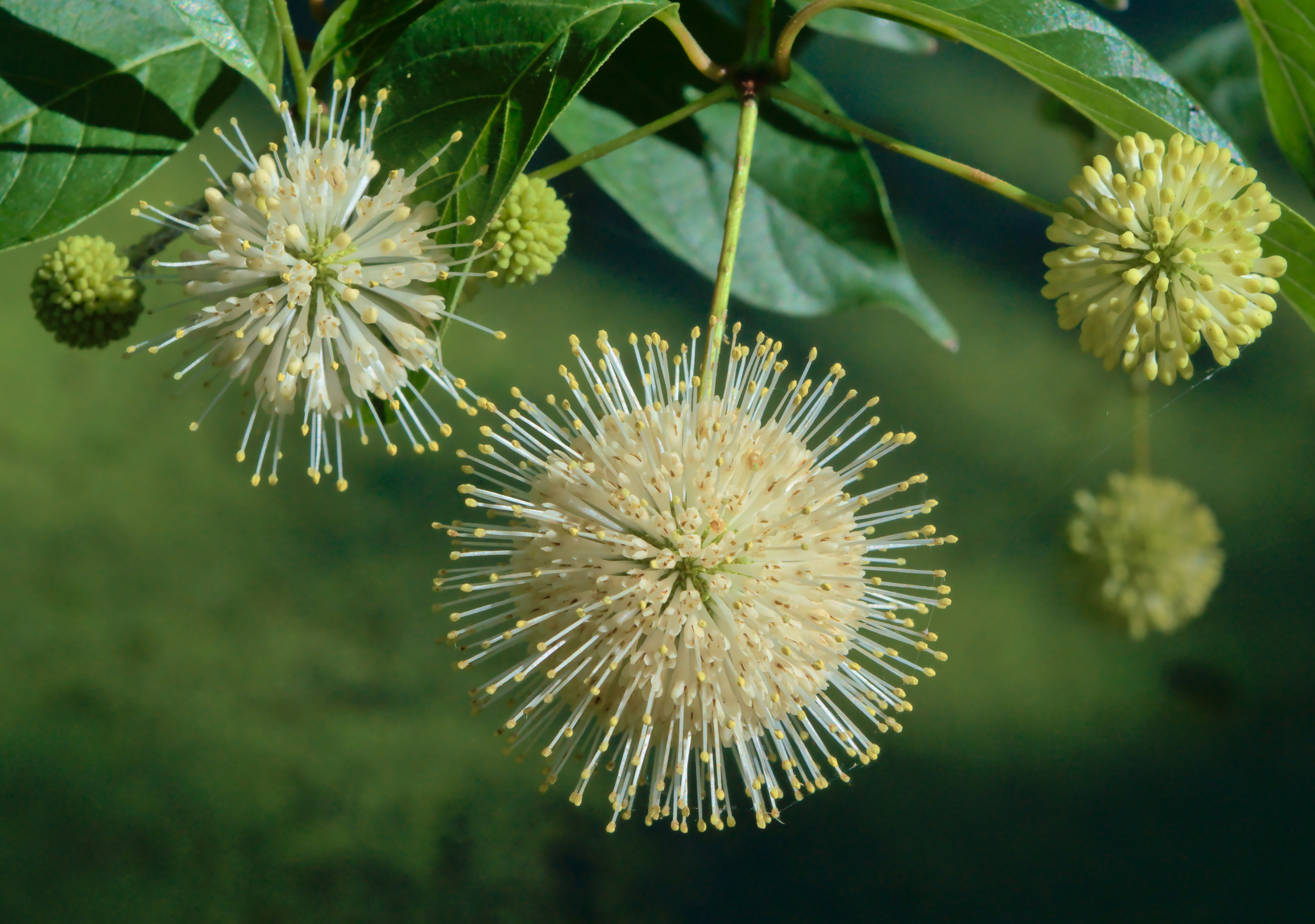
- Cephalanthus occidentalis var. occidentalis blooming in Point Pelee National Park (Ontario, Canada).

Conservation status
- Least Concern (IUCN 3.1)

Scientific classification
- Kingdom: Plantae
- Clade: Tracheophytes
- Clade: Angiosperms
- Clade: Eudicots
- Clade: Asterids
- Order: Gentianales
- Family: Rubiaceae
- Genus: Cephalanthus
- Species: C. occidentalis

Binomial name
- Cephalanthus occidentalis L., 1753

Varieties
- C. o. var. californicus C. o. var. occidentalis
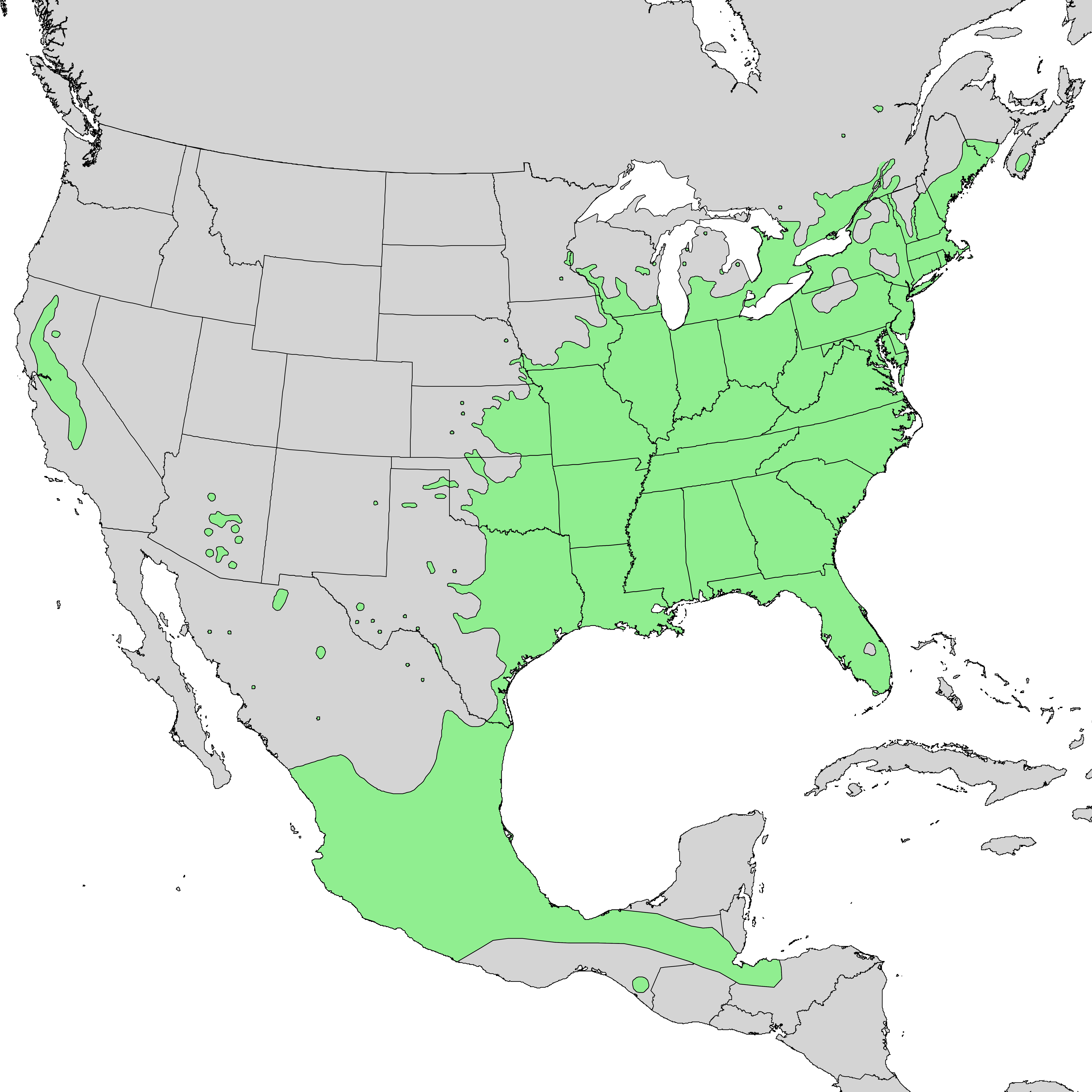
- Natural range of Cephalanthus occidentalis

= Cephalanthus occidentalis =

Species of flowering plant

Cephalanthus occidentalis is a species of flowering plant in the family Rubiaceae that is native to eastern and southern North America. Common names include buttonbush, common buttonbush, button-willow, buck brush, and honey-bells.

== Description ==
Cephalanthus occidentalis is a deciduous shrub or small tree that averages 1–3 m (3.3–9.8 ft) in height, but can reach 6 m (20 ft). The leaves are opposite or in whorls of three, elliptic to ovate, 7–18 cm (2.8–7.1 in) long and 4–10 cm (1.6–3.9 in) broad, with a smooth edge and a short petiole. The flowers are arranged in a dense spherical inflorescence 2–3.5 cm (0.79–1.38 in) in diameter on a short peduncle. Each flower has a fused white to pale yellow four-lobed corolla forming a long slender tube connecting to the sepals. The stigma protrudes slightly from the corolla. The fruit is a spherical cluster of achenes (nutlets).

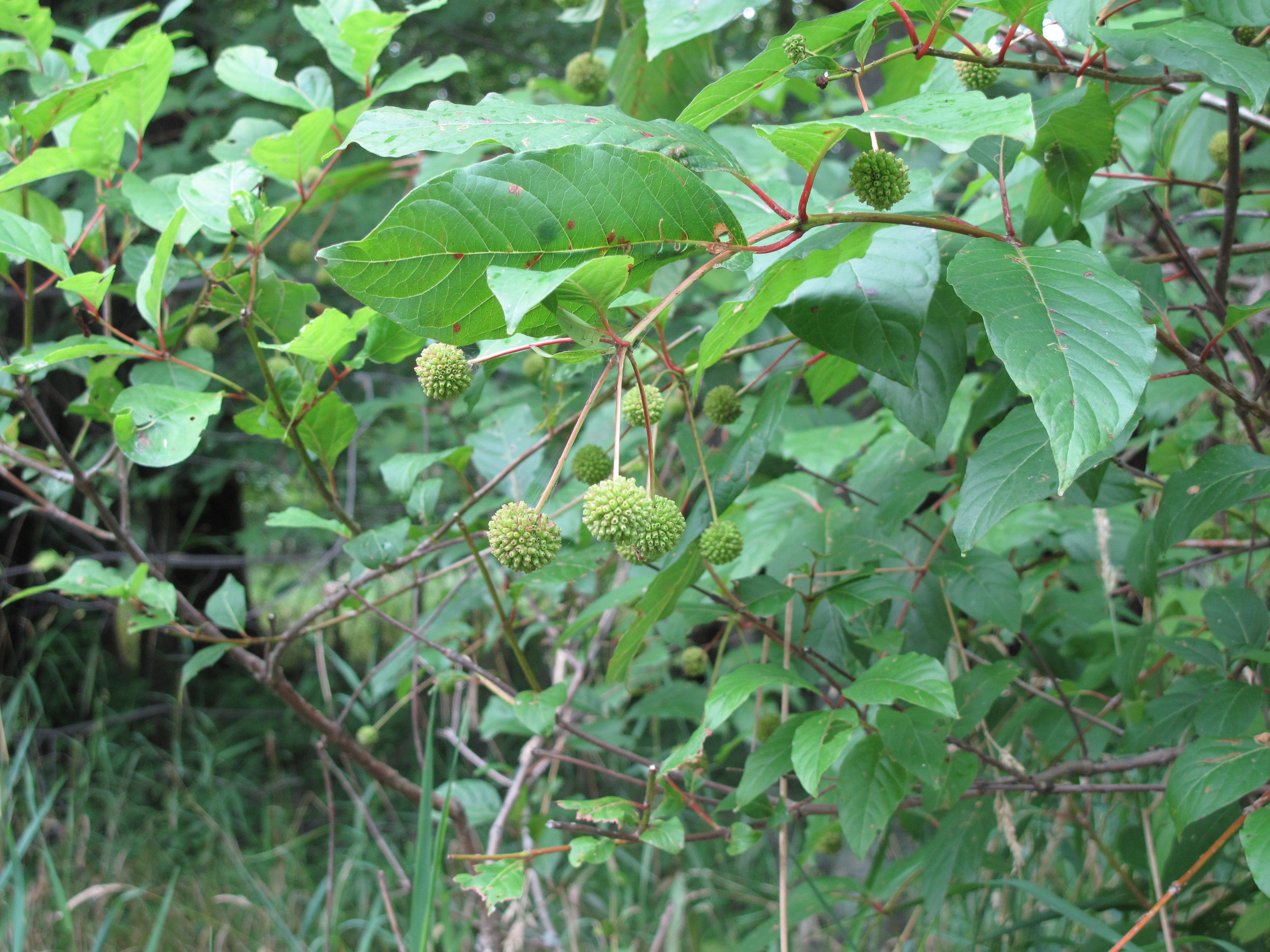
Leaves opposite or in whorls of three; inflorescences may be in clusters

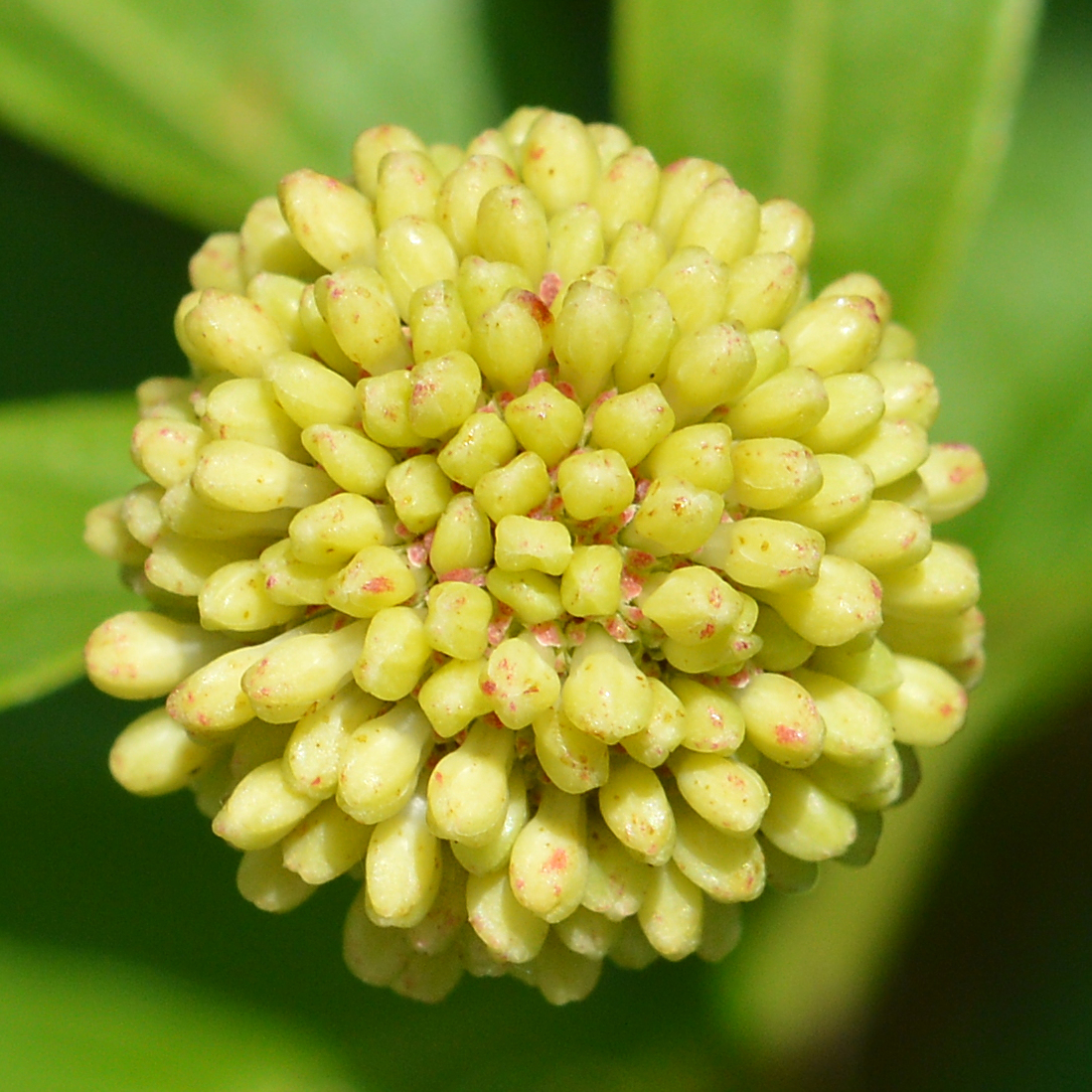
Flower buds

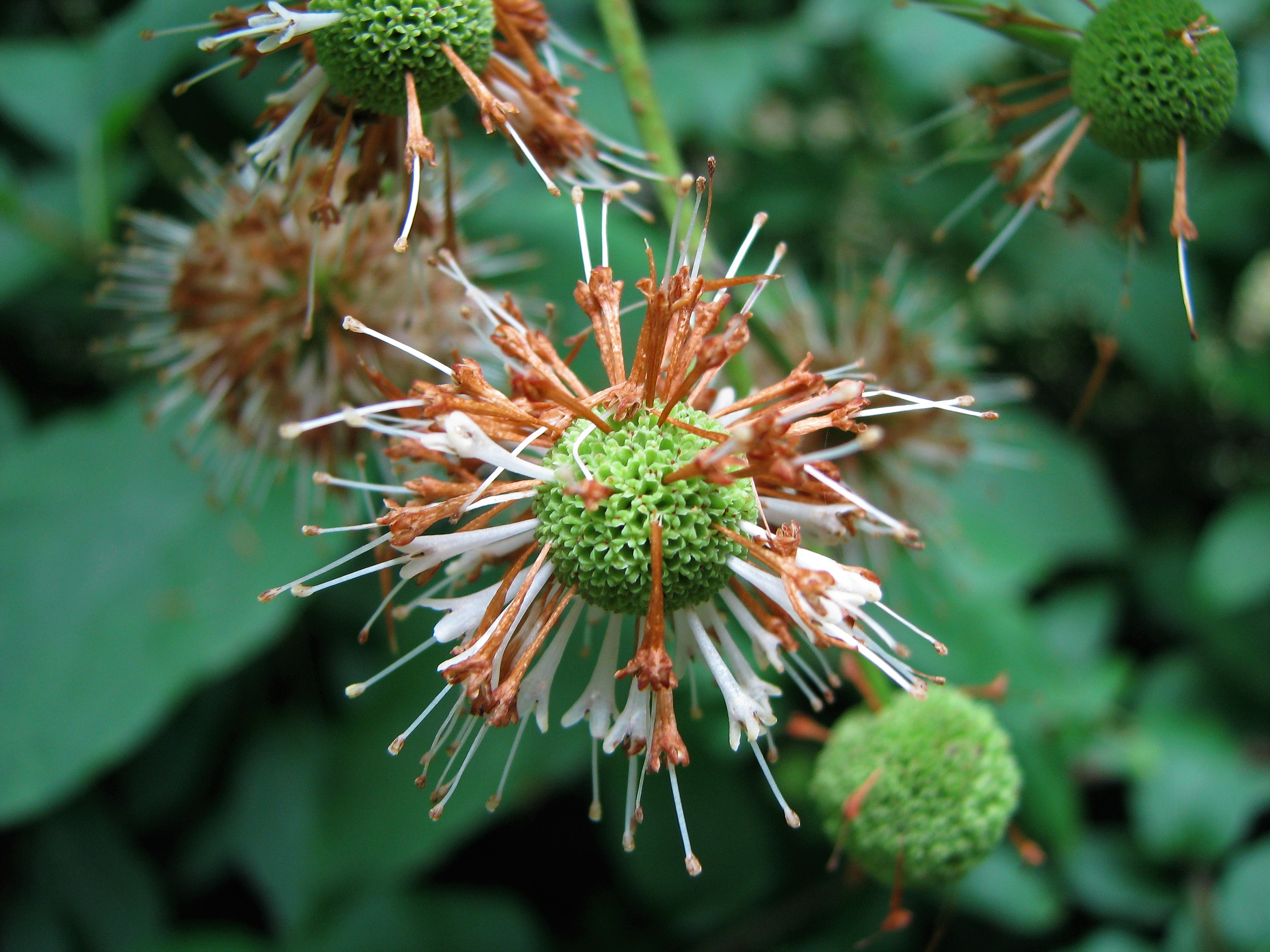
Aged flowers

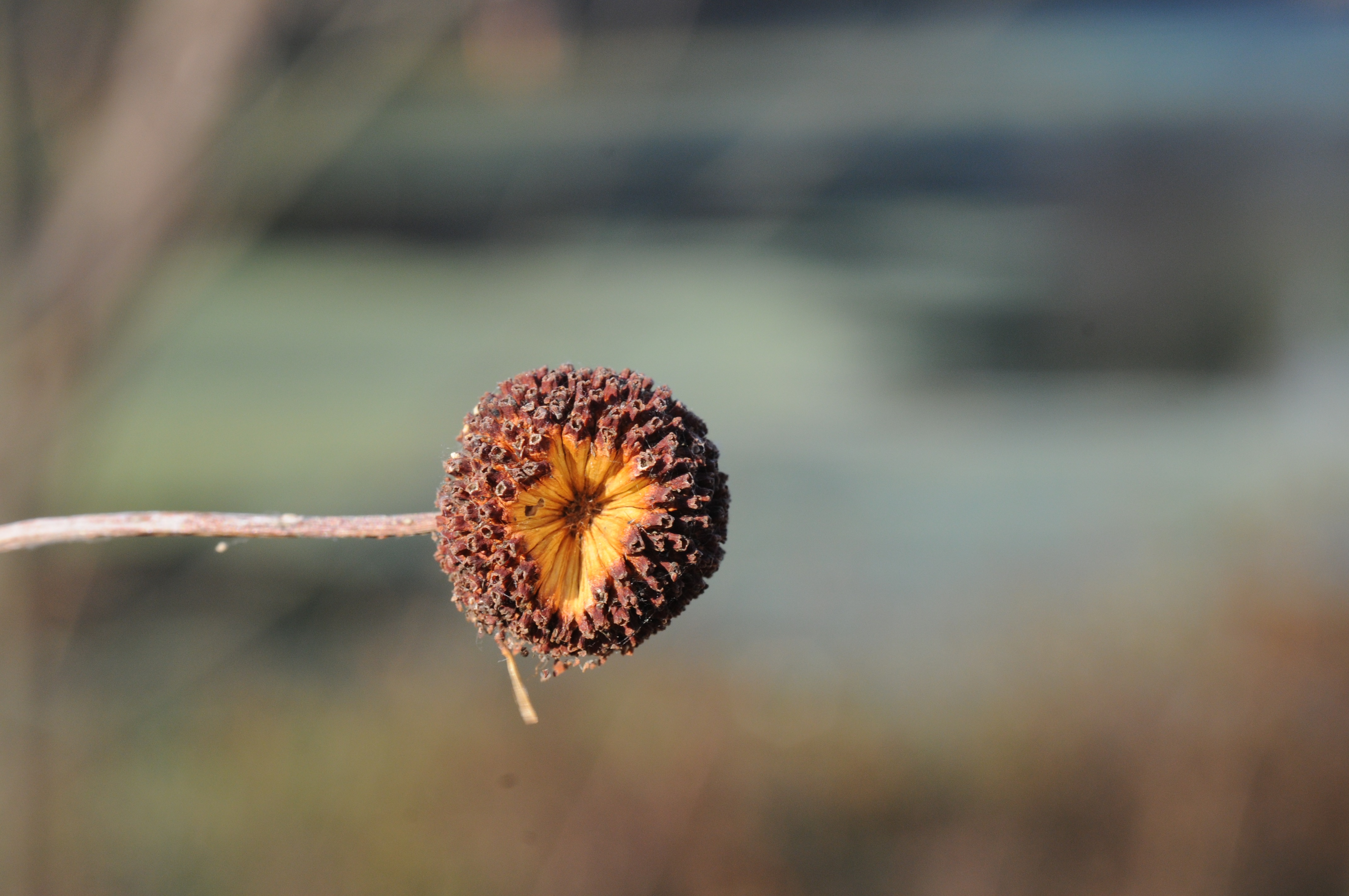
Infructescence, a cluster of achenes

== Taxonomy ==
There are two varieties, not considered distinct by all authorities:

- Cephalanthus occidentalis var. occidentalis (syn. var. pubescens) – common buttonbush. Eastern North America from Nova Scotia west to Minnesota and south to Florida and east Texas.
- Cephalanthus occidentalis var. californicus – California button-willow. Southwestern North America, from west Texas west to California (Sierra Nevada foothills, San Joaquin Valley, Sacramento Valley, and the Inner North Coast Ranges) and south to Mexico and Central America.

== Habitat ==
Buttonbush is a common shrub of many wetland habitats in its range, including swamps, floodplains, mangrove, pocosin, riparian zones, and moist forest understory. It is a member of the flora in the Everglades.

== Ecology ==
Waterfowl and other birds eat the seeds. Wood ducks utilize the plant as nest protection, and mallards eat the fruit. Deer browse the foliage, which is poisonous to livestock. Insects and hummingbirds take the nectar, with bees using it to make honey. It is a larval host to the hydrangea sphinx, the royal walnut moth, and the titan sphinx.

== Distribution ==
The species occurs in eastern North America with disjunct populations occurring in the west. In Canada, it occurs from southern Ontario and Quebec east to New Brunswick and south-western Nova Scotia. Besides the eastern United States, and eastern regions of the Midwest, notable areas range into Arizona, the Mogollon Rim, and other mountain ranges; in California, the entire San Joaquin Valley West of the Great Plains and the Rocky Mountains, only western Texas, Arizona, and California find C. occidentalis.

== Uses ==
=== Medicinal ===
Cephalanthus occidentalis has a number of historical medicinal uses, but it is also toxic due to the presence of cephalanthin.

=== Cultivation ===
Buttonbush is cultivated as an ornamental plant for a nectar source or 'honey plant' and for aesthetics in gardens and native plant landscapes, and is planted on slopes to help control erosion. Buttonbush is a suitable shrub for butterfly gardens.

== San Joaquin Valley landmark tree ==
The town of Buttonwillow, California was named for the buttonbush (Cephalanthus occidentalis). A lone buttonbush served as a landmark on an old trans-San Joaquin Valley trail, and was used by ancient Yokuts as a meeting place. It later became the site of settlers' stock rodeos. This buttonbush tree is listed as California Historical Landmark No. 492, and is now known as the "Buttonwillow Tree".
