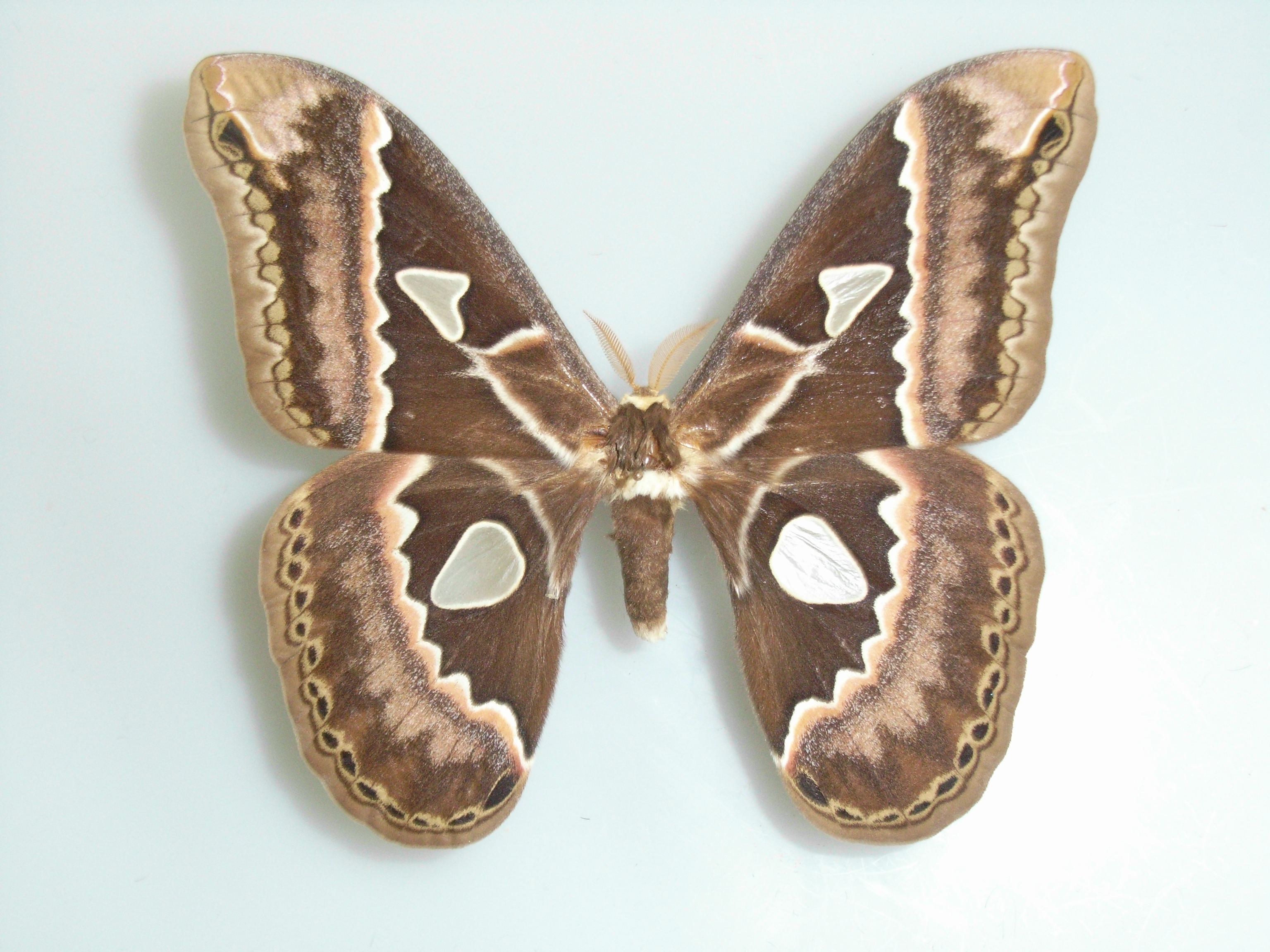

Scientific classification
- Kingdom: Animalia
- Phylum: Arthropoda
- Class: Insecta
- Order: Lepidoptera
- Family: Saturniidae
- Genus: Rothschildia
- Species: R. maurus

Binomial name
- Rothschildia maurus (Burmeister, 1879)

= Rothschildia maurus =

Species of moth

Rothschildia maurus is a moth of the family Saturniidae. It is found in South America, including Paraguay, Argentina and Bolivia.
