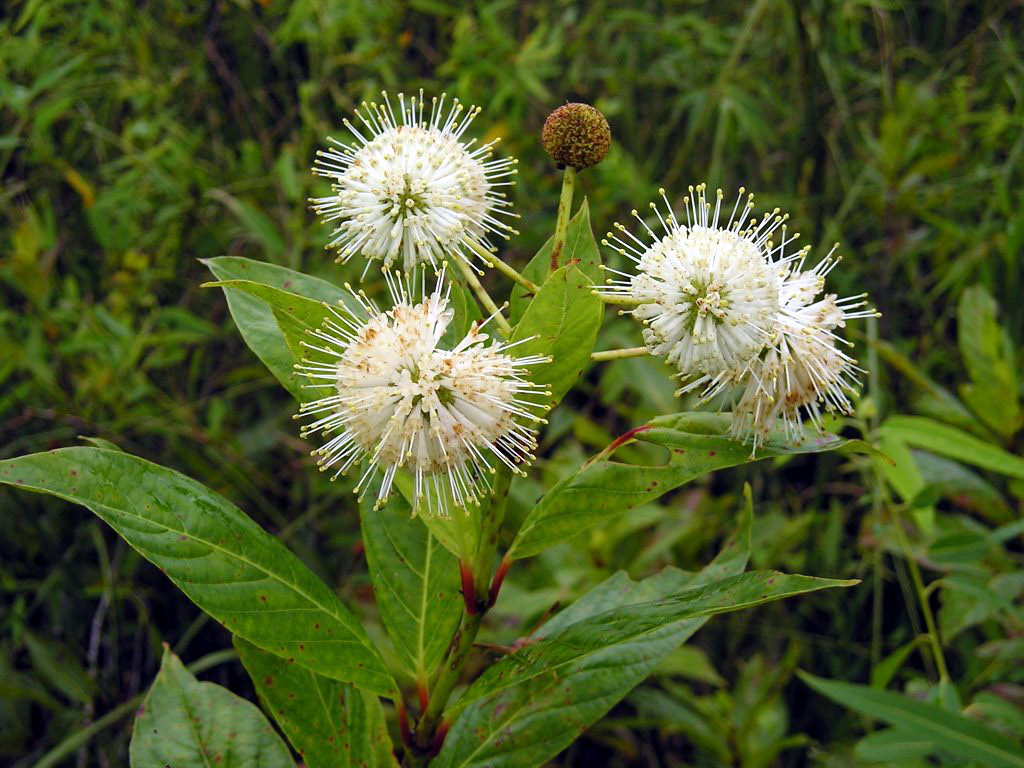
- Cephalanthus occidentalis

Scientific classification
- Kingdom: Plantae
- Clade: Embryophytes
- Clade: Tracheophytes
- Clade: Angiosperms
- Clade: Eudicots
- Clade: Asterids
- Order: Gentianales
- Family: Rubiaceae
- Subfamily: Cinchonoideae
- Tribe: Naucleeae
- Genus: Cephalanthus; L.

Type species
- Cephalanthus occidentalis L.

Species
- Cephalanthus angustifolius Lour.; Cephalanthus glabratus (Spreng.) K.Schum.; Cephalanthus occidentalis L.; Cephalanthus salicifolius Bonpl.; Cephalanthus tetrandrus (Roxb.) Ridsdale & Bakh.f.

Synonyms
- Acrodryon Spreng.; Axolus Raf.; Eresimus Raf.; Gilipus Raf.; Silamnus Raf.

= Cephalanthus =

Genus of flowering plants

Cephalanthus is a genus of flowering plants in the family Rubiaceae. There are five extant species that are commonly known as buttonbush.

== Description ==
They are shrubs or small trees growing to 5–15 m (16–49 ft) tall. The leaves are simple, arranged in opposite pairs or whorls of three. The flowers form a dense globular inflorescence.

== Distribution and habitat ==
Cephalanthus occidentalis is native to the eastern United States and Canada. The others occur in tropical regions of the Americas, Africa and Asia. Two species are known in cultivation.

== Systematics ==
Cephalanthus was named by Linnaeus in Species Plantarum in 1753. The generic name is derived from the Ancient Greek words κέφαλη (kephale), meaning "head", and ἄνθος (anthos), meaning "flower".

=== Taxonomy ===
Cephalanthus is the most basal genus in the tribe Naucleeae. Some authors have segregated it into its own monotypic tribe. The type species is Cephalanthus occidentalis.

=== Species ===
The following five extant species are accepted:

- Cephalanthus angustifolius Lour. – Laos, Cambodia, Vietnam
- Cephalanthus glabratus (Spreng.) K.Schum. – sarandí – Brazil, Argentina, Paraguay, Uruguay
- Cephalanthus occidentalis L. – button-willow, common buttonbush, honey-bells – Cuba, eastern Canada, eastern, central and southern United States, California, Arizona, New Mexico
- Cephalanthus salicifolius Humb. & Bonpl. – Mexican buttonbush, willowleaf buttonbush – Mexico, Honduras, extreme southern tip of Texas
- Cephalanthus tetrandrus (Roxb.) Ridsdale & Bakh.f. – tropical Asia from India to China and Thailand

== Fossil record ==
Sixteen fossil mericarps of †Cephalanthus pusillus have been described from middle Miocene strata of the Fasterholt area near Silkeborg in Central Jutland, Denmark.
