= Tupi people =

Indigenous people of Brazil

Tupi
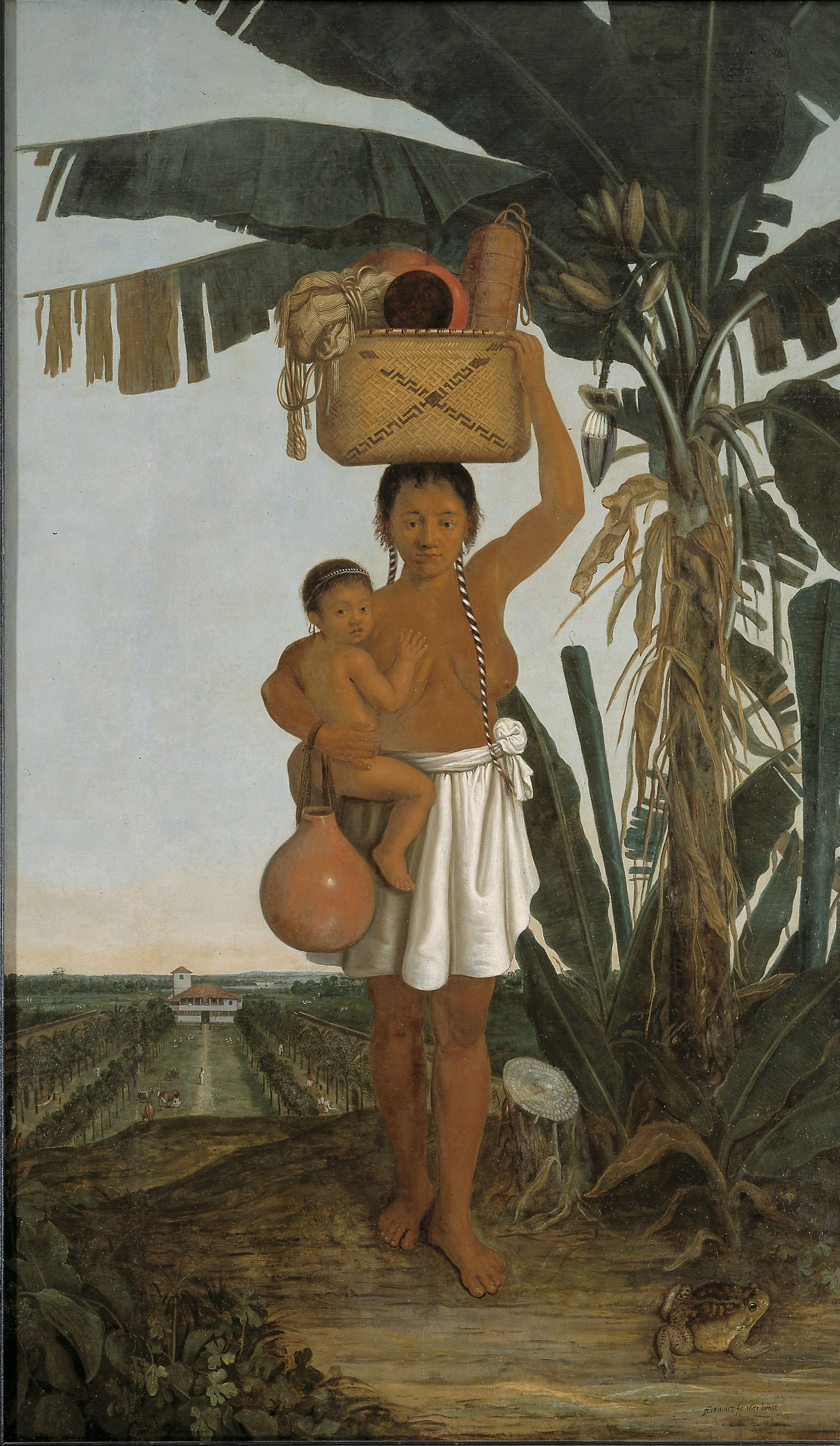
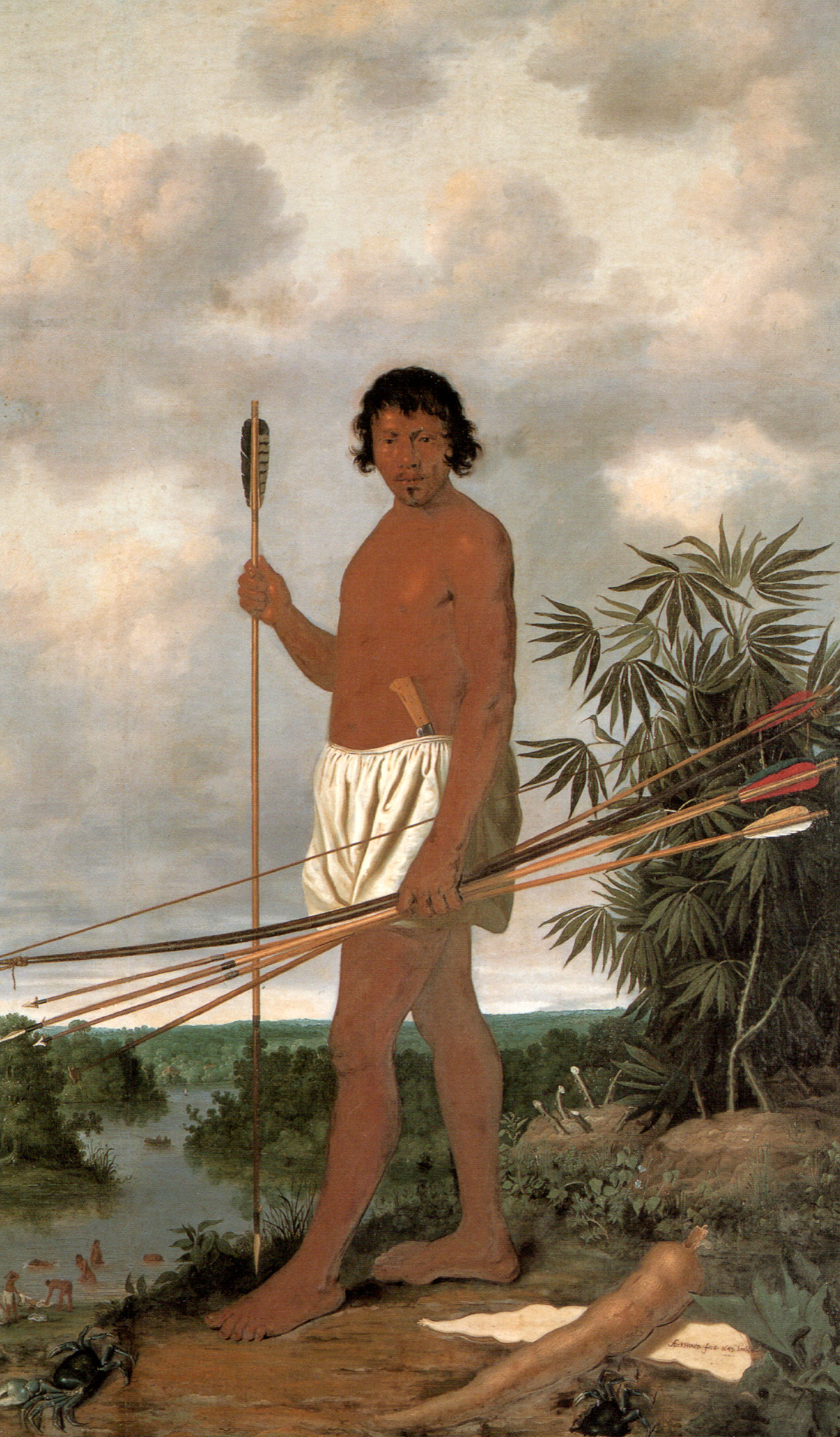
- Albert Eckhout's painting of the Tupi

Total population
- Historical: 1,000,000; Contemporary: ~16,467; Potiguara: 10,837, Tupinambá de Olivença: 3,000, Tupiniquim: 2,630; 30 others extinct as tribes but blood ancestors to the Brazilian population

Regions with significant populations
- Central and Coastal Brazil

Languages
- Tupi languages, later língua geral, much later Portuguese

Religion
- Indigenous, later Christianity

Related ethnic groups
- Guaraní tribes

The Tupi people, a subdivision of the Tupi-Guarani linguistic families, were one of the largest groups of Indigenous peoples in Brazil before its colonization. Scholars believe that while they first settled in the Amazon rainforest, from about 2,900 years ago the Tupi started to migrate southward and, from around 1,000 years ago, gradually occupied the Atlantic coast of Southeast Brazil.

Many Tupi people today are merged with the Guaraní people, forming the Tupi–Guarani languages. The Guarani languages are a subdivision of the Tupian languages.

== History ==
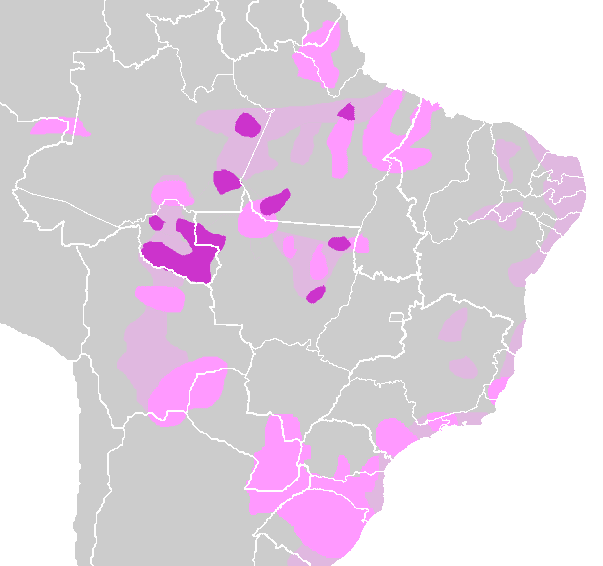
Tupi (violet) and other Tupi-Guarani (pink) languages areas and early probable areas (pink-gray)

The Tupi people inhabited 3/4 of all of Brazil's coast when the Portuguese first arrived there. In 1500, their population was estimated at 1 million people, nearly equal to the population of Portugal at the time. They were divided into tribes, each tribe numbering from 300 to 2,000 people. Some examples of these tribes are: Tupiniquim, Tupinambá, Potiguara, Tabajara, Caeté, Tamoios, and Temiminó. The Tupi were adept agriculturalists; they grew cassava, maize, sweet potatoes, beans, peanuts, tobacco, squash, cotton, and many others. There was not a unified Tupi identity despite the fact that they spoke a common language.

=== European colonization ===
Upon discovering the existence of the Tupi people, Portuguese settlers assumed that they lacked any sort of religion, a belief that began the process of assimilating the Tupi to Christianity. The settlers began erecting villages for the Tupi, known as aldeias, with the intention of more disciplined religious conversion and institutionalization of European customs. The Portuguese settlers also considered the Tupi useful as laborers for cultivating and shipping exports and eventually enslaved the Tupi. In turn, fatal Afro-Eurasian diseases spread on the plantations at which the Tupi worked. This combination of factors nearly led to their complete annihilation, with the exception of a few isolated communities. The remnants of these tribes are today confined to indigenous territories or acculturated to some degree into the dominant society.

=== Religion ===
As Eduardo Navarro explains in his Dicionário de Tupi Antigo (2013), the different Tupi peoples believed they descended from a mythological character called Tupi. Because of this, many Tupi tribes had ethnonyms that began with "tupi", such as the Tupinambá, the Tupiniquim, the Tupiguaé, and the Tupiminó. However, the main cult among the Tupi who inhabited the coast of Brazil in the 16th century was not that of Tupi, but that of Jurupari. Tupã, the thunder, was not actually a god, but rather a manifestation of the god Nhanderuvuçu. Precisely because Tupã did not have his own rite, the Catholic priests who sought to spread Christianity among the Indians chose Tupã as a symbol for the Christian God, in order to facilitate the understanding of Christianity by the Indians, grafting Christian principles onto the figure of Tupã. At the same time, they associated Jurupari with the Christian devil, in order to discourage his worship among the Tupi Indians.

=== Cannibalism ===
According to primary source accounts by primarily European writers, the Tupi were divided into several tribes that constantly warred with each other. During these wars, the Tupi frequently tried to capture their enemies to kill later in cannibalistic rituals. The warriors captured from other Tupi tribes were eaten because the Tupi believed that this allowed them to absorb and digest the captured warriors' strength; thus, in fear of absorbing weakness, they chose only to sacrifice warriors perceived to be strong and brave. For the Tupi warriors, even when prisoners, it was a great honor to die valiantly during battle or to display courage during the festivities leading to the sacrifice. The Tupi have also been documented to eat the remains of dead relatives as a form of honoring them.

The practice of cannibalism among the Tupi was made famous in Europe by Hans Staden, a German soldier, mariner, and mercenary, traveling to Brazil to seek a fortune, who was captured by the Tupi in 1552. In his account published in 1557, he tells that the Tupi carried him to their village where they declared that they would devour him at their next festivity. There, he allegedly won the friendship of a powerful chief, whom he cured of a disease, and his life was spared.

Cannibalistic rituals among Tupi and other tribes in Brazil decreased steadily after European contact and religious intervention. When Cabeza de Vaca, a Spanish conquistador, arrived in Santa Catarina in 1541, for instance, he attempted to ban cannibalistic practices in the name of the King of Spain.

Because our understanding of Tupi cannibalism relies mostly on the primary source accounts of European writers, some academics have disputed the very existence of cannibalism among the Tupi people. William Arens seeks to discredit Staden's and other writers' accounts of cannibalism in his book The Man-Eating Myth, where he claims that when concerning the Tupinambá, "rather than dealing with an instance of serial documentation of cannibalism, we are more likely confronting only one source of dubious testimony which has been incorporated almost verbatim into the written reports of others claiming to be eyewitnesses".

Most Brazilian scholars, however, attest to the cultural centrality of cannibalism in Tupian culture. Anthropologist Darcy Ribeiro, who had deeply studied the historical accounts about the Tupi, reported that the Ka'apor people of the Tupi-Guaraní linguistic and cultural family confirmed that their ancestors had practiced anthropophagical rituals similar to the ones described in the 16th century. Other Brazilian scholars have criticized Arens for what they perceived as historical negationism, and for ignoring important sources (Jesuit letters) and historical and anthropological studies (Viveiros de Castro, Florestan Fernandes, Estevão Pinto, Hélène Clastres), many of them dealing directly with indigenous peoples, that point to the direction of anthropophagy being well established as a social and cultural practice. Arens has been criticized particularly for, in attempting to discredit the association of the Tupi with savagery, failing to recognize that the Europeans had not comprehended the cultural significance of traditional practices such as cannibalism.

=== Race-mixing and Cunhadismo ===
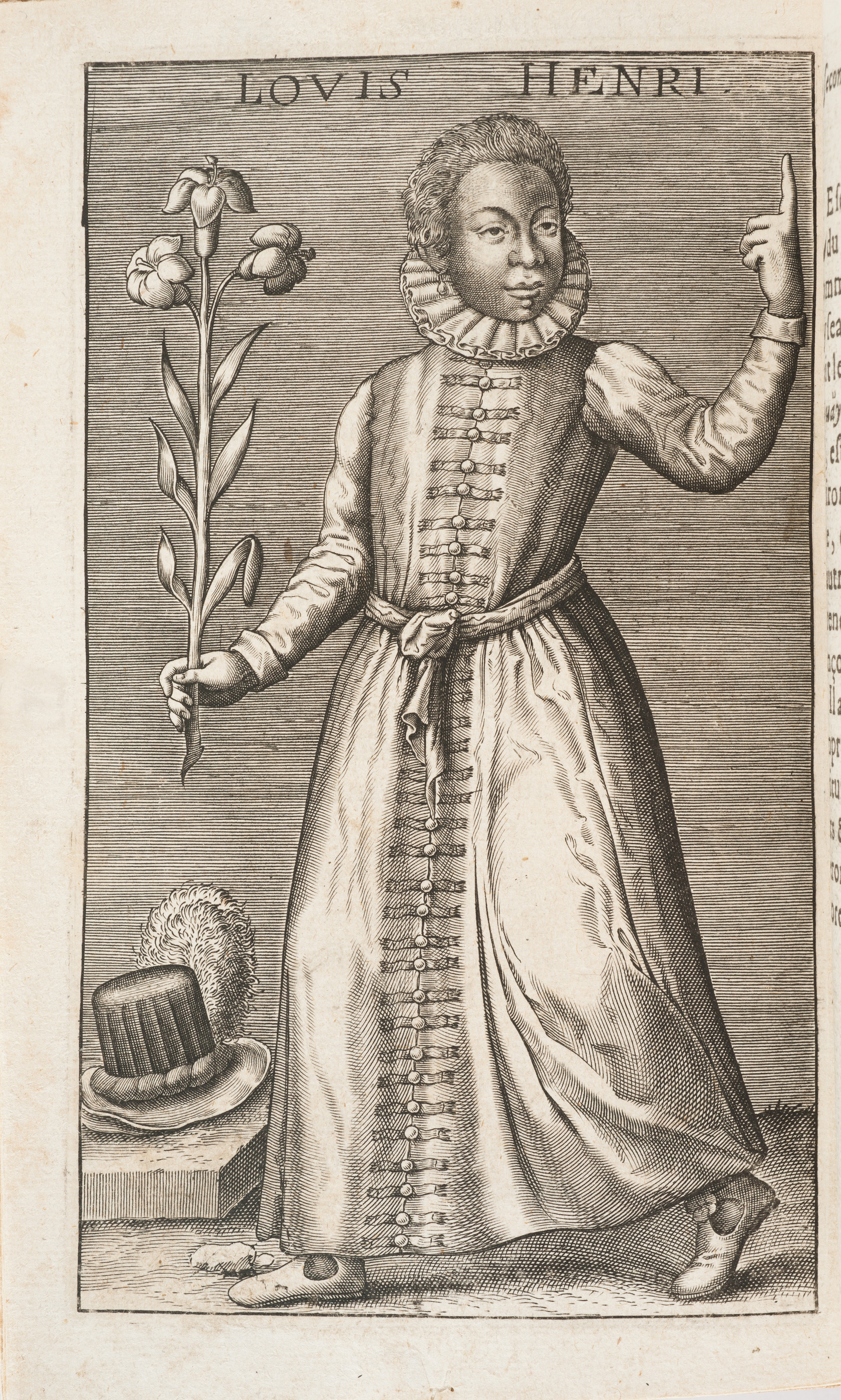
A Tupinambá named "Louis Henri", who visited Louis XIII in Paris in 1613, in Claude d'Abbeville, Histoire de la mission.

Many indigenous peoples were important for the formation of the Brazilian people, but the main group was the Tupi. When the Portuguese explorers arrived in Brazil in the 16th century, the Tupi were the first indigenous group to have contact with them. Soon, a process of mixing between Portuguese settlers and indigenous women started. The Portuguese colonists rarely brought women, making the native women the "breeding matrix of the Brazilian people". When the first Europeans arrived, the phenomenon of "cunhadismo" (from Portuguese cunhado, "brother in law") began to spread by the colony. Cunhadismo was an old native tradition of incorporating strangers to their community. The Natives offered the Portuguese an Indigenous woman as wife. Once he agreed, he formed a bond of kinship with all the Natives of the tribe. Polygyny, a common practice among South American Indigenous people, was quickly adopted by European settlers. This way, a single European man could have dozens of indigenous wives (temericós).

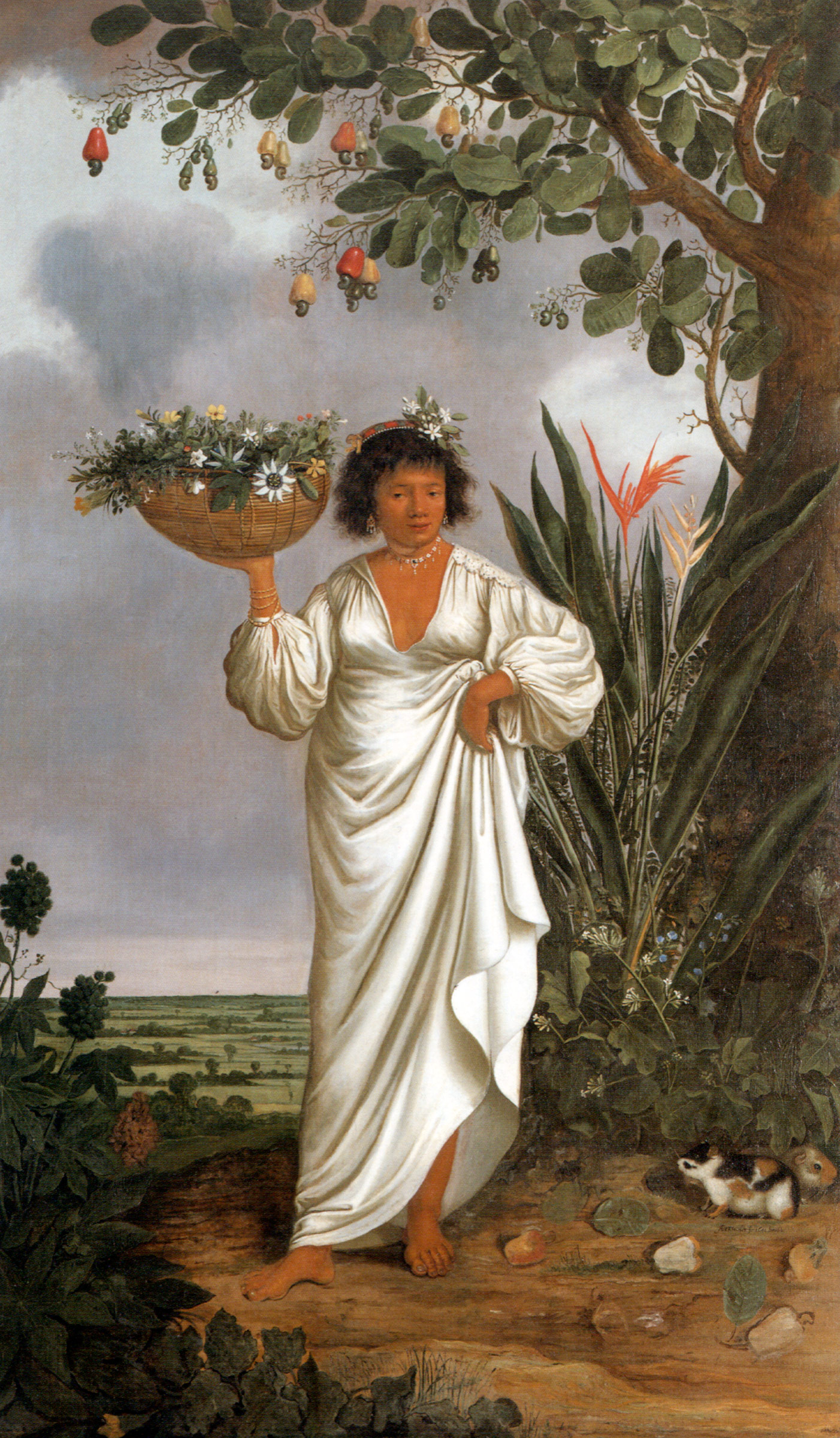
Albert Eckhout: a mixed-race (Mameluco) woman (circa 1641–1644)

Cunhadismo was used as recruitment of labour. The Portuguese could have many temericós and thus a huge number of Indigenous relatives who were induced to work for him, especially to cut pau-brasil and take it to the ships on the coast. In the process, a large mixed-race (mameluco) population was formed, which in fact occupied Brazil. Without the practice of cunhadismo, the Portuguese colonization was impractical. The number of Portuguese men in Brazil was very small and Portuguese women were even fewer in number. The proliferation of mixed-race people in the wombs of indigenous women provided for the occupation of the territory and the consolidation of the Portuguese presence in the region.

=== Influence in Brazil ===
Although the Tupi population largely disappeared because of Afro-Eurasian diseases to which they had no resistance or because of slavery, a large population of maternal Tupi ancestry occupied much of Brazilian territory, taking the ancient traditions to several points of the country. Darcy Ribeiro wrote that the features of the first Brazilians were much more Tupi than Portuguese, and even the language that they spoke was a Tupi-derived language, named Nheengatu or Língua Geral, a lingua franca in Brazil until the 18th century. The region of São Paulo was the biggest in the proliferation of Mamelucos, who in the 17th century under the name of Bandeirantes, spread throughout the Brazilian territory, from the Amazon rainforest to the extreme South. They were responsible for the major expansion of the Iberian culture in the interior of Brazil. They acculturated the indigenous tribes who lived in isolation, and took the language of the colonizer, which was not Portuguese yet, but Nheengatu itself, to the most inhospitable corners of the colony. Nheengatu is still spoken in certain regions of the Amazon, although the Tupi-speaking Natives did not live there. The Nheengatu language, as in other regions of the country, was introduced there by Bandeirantes from São Paulo in the 17th century. The way of life of the Old Paulistas could almost be confused with the Natives. Within the family, only Nheengatu was spoken. Agriculture, hunting, fishing and gathering of fruits were also based on indigenous traditions. What differentiated the Old Paulistas from the Tupi was the use of clothes, salt, metal tools, weapons and other European items.

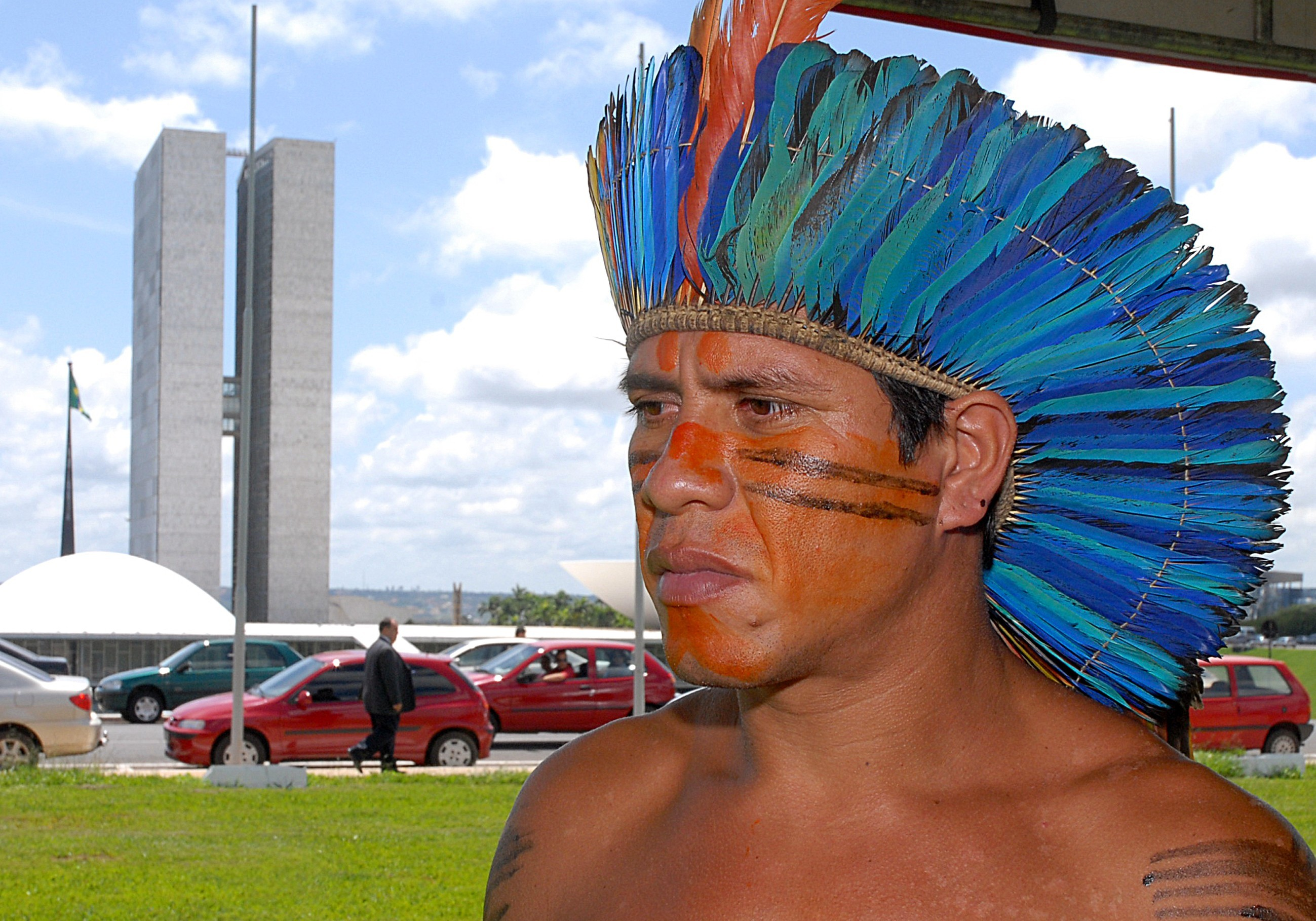
A Tupiniquim chief (Cacique) in Brasília, 2007

When these areas of large Tupi influence started to be integrated into the market economy, Brazilian society gradually started to lose its Tupi characteristics. The Portuguese language became dominant and Língua Geral virtually disappeared. The rustic indigenous techniques of production were replaced by European ones, in order to elevate the capacity of exportation. Brazilian Portuguese absorbed many words from Tupi. Some examples of Portuguese words that came from Tupi are: mingau, mirim, soco, cutucar, tiquinho, perereca, tatu. The names of several local fauna – such as arara ("macaw"), jacaré ("South American alligator"), tucano ("toucan") – and flora – e.g. mandioca ("manioc") and abacaxi ("pineapple") – are also derived from the Tupi language. A number of places and cities in modern Brazil are named in Tupi, such as Itaquaquecetuba, Pindamonhangaba, Caruaru, and Ipanema. Anthroponyms include Ubirajara, Ubiratã, Moema, Jussara, Jurema, and Janaína. Tupi surnames do exist, but they do not imply any real Tupi ancestry; rather they were adopted as a manner to display Brazilian nationalism.

The Tupinambá tribe is fictitiously portrayed in Nelson Pereira dos Santos' satirical 1971 film How Tasty Was My Little Frenchman (Como Era Gostoso o Meu Francês). Its name is also adapted by science: Tupinambis is a genus of tegus, arguably the best-known lizards of Brazil.

The large offshore Tupi oil field discovered off the coast of Brazil in 2006 was named in honor of the Tupi people.

The Guarani are a different native group that inhabits southern Brazil, Uruguay, Paraguay, Bolivia, and northern Argentina and speaks the distinct Guarani languages, but these are in the same language family as Tupi.

== Legacy ==
The Tupi people had a great cultural influence on the countries they inhabited. Innumerable people, streets, neighborhoods, cities, rivers, animals, fruits, plants, football clubs, and companies in Brazil, Bolivia, Paraguay, Argentina, and Uruguay are named in Guarani.

=== Tupi-Guarani placenames in other countries ===
The Tupi people were present in almost all of South America, excluding Chile.

==== French Guiana ====
Cayenne, the francization of the name Kỹiña ("mean chili pepper")

==== Peru ====
Aguaytía Aguai'ty ("plantation of aguai"), Curiyaca, Imambari

==== Bolivia ====
Yacuiba, Paraimiri, Itaimbeguasu, Tatarenda, Saipurú, Capirenda, Itay, Ibamiragera, Carandaytí, Ipaguasú, Abapó, Timboy, Caraparí, Urubichá, Kuruguakua, Guanay, Yaguarú and Rogagua.

==== Uruguay ====
Tacuarembó, Pa'i Sandu, Chapicuy ("worn out"), Sarandí del Yí Sarãndy del Y ("bushes of the Yí"), Balneario Iporá ("beautiful watering place"), El Ombú, Yacuy (Salto), Sarandí del Arapey Sarãndy del Árape'y ("bushes of the daily tasks river"), Sarandí Grande, Ituzaingó and Aiguá

== Notable Tupi people ==
- Catarina Paraguaçu, 1528—1586
- Arariboia, founder of Niterói, Brazil
- Cunhambebe
- Tibiriçá

== See also ==
- Cunhambira
- De Gestis Mendi de Saa
- Tupi language
