= Rothschildia forbesi =

Scientific classification
- Kingdom: Animalia
- Phylum: Arthropoda
- Clade: Pancrustacea
- Class: Insecta
- Order: Lepidoptera
- Family: Saturniidae
- Genus: Rothschildia
- Species: R. forbesi

Binomial name
- Rothschildia forbesi Benjamin, 1934

Silkmoth

Rothschildia forbesi, the Forbes' silkmoth, is a species of silkmoth in the family Saturniidae. It is native to the Neotropics and reaches the northern limit of its known range in the Lower Rio Grande Valley of southern Texas. It is listed as Hodges number 7761.

== Etymology and taxonomy ==
The genus name Rothschildia honours the British zoologist and entomologist Walter Rothschild. The specific epithet forbesi honours the American entomologist William Alexander Forbes. The species was described by Benjamin in 1934.

Rothschildia forbesi was subsequently treated as a subspecies of Rothschildia lebeau, under the name Rothschildia lebeau forbesi, by several authorities, including Tuskes, Tuttle and Collins (1996). It is now recognized as a distinct species in its own right, Rothschildia forbesi, rather than as a subspecies of R. lebeau.

== Habitat ==
R. forbesi is distributed from South America north through Central America and Mexico to the Lower Rio Grande Valley of southern Texas. In the United States, it is known from southeastern Texas, particularly Hidalgo and Cameron counties. Records from Mexico include the states of Tamaulipas and Nuevo León.

The species occurs in areas where its larval host plants are present, including wooded habitats and riparian vegetation. Adults are nocturnal.

== Morphology ==
The Forbes' silkmoth is a large saturniid with a wingspan of approximately 10–12.5 cm. Its wings are reddish-brown to dark brown, sometimes with an olive tinge, and bear translucent triangular spots. The larvae are characterized by green bodies and prominent yellow dorsal scoli tipped with fine black spines.

Jashandeep Shostak (Lepidopterologist) has described the species as having a striking appearance, particularly for its reddish-brown wings and translucent markings.

As in other saturniids, adults do not feed and have reduced mouthparts, relying on energy reserves accumulated during the larval stage.

== Life cycle ==
Adult Forbes' silkmoth beside its silken cocoon, illustrating the adult & pupal stages of its life cycle.

Rothschildia forbesi has a typical saturniid life cycle consisting of egg, larva, pupa and adult stages. In Texas, it is bivoltine, with adults recorded primarily from February to April and again from September to November. The timing of these generations varies with local environmental conditions.

Adults are primarily nocturnal. Males locate females by following their pheromones, after which females deposit eggs on suitable host plants. Adult moths have reduced mouthparts and do not feed, instead relying on energy reserves accumulated during the larval stage. Their adult lifespan is consequently short and is primarily devoted to mating and reproduction.

The eggs are deposited on the foliage of host plants and hatch after a period of development. The larvae initially may feed in groups before becoming more dispersed as they grow. They pass through several instars, feeding on the leaves of woody plants and increasing rapidly in size. Recorded larval host plants include lime prickly-ash (Zanthoxylum fagara), Mexican ash (Fraxinus berlandieriana), Salix species, peach (Prunus persica), Citrus species and Acacia species.

After completing larval development, the caterpillar forms a silken cocoon, generally on or near its host plant, where it pupates. The pupal stage may last several weeks or longer depending on temperature and seasonal conditions. In the autumn generation, pupae may overwinter before emerging as adults during the following season.

Larvae are subject to predation and parasitism, while the cocoon provides protection during the pupal stage. The species is associated with wooded and riparian habitats supporting its larval host plants, making the availability of suitable vegetation an important component of its ecology.
