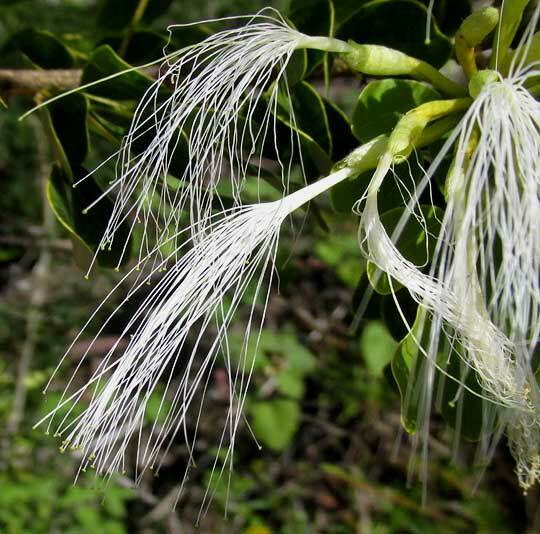
- Sphinga platyloba flowers

Scientific classification
- Kingdom: Plantae
- Clade: Tracheophytes
- Clade: Angiosperms
- Clade: Eudicots
- Clade: Rosids
- Order: Fabales
- Family: Fabaceae
- Subfamily: Caesalpinioideae
- Clade: Mimosoid clade
- Genus: Sphinga
- Species: S. platyloba

Binomial name
- Sphinga platyloba (Bertero ex DC.) Barneby & J.W. Grimes(2017)

Synonyms
- See text

= Sphinga platyloba =

Species of flowering plant

Sphinga platyloba is a species of climbing shrub and member of the family Fabaceae.

== Description ==
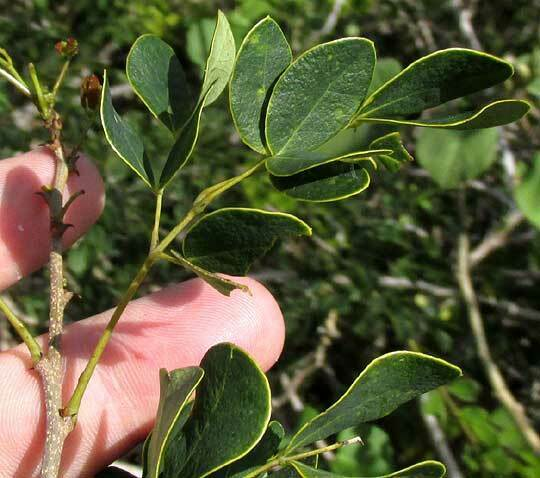
twice-divided compound leaves

Sphinga platyloba is variable in terms of growth, the structure of its leaves, its hairiness, and number of stamens. Keeping that in mind, it can be said that the species is woody and stiffly branched. The branches are armed with conspicuous woody stipules in the form of stout spines up to 5mm long (~ 13/64 inch). Leaves normally are twice divided into leaflets, the leaflets being paler on their undersurfaces than on their tops.

Seven to 15 flowers are clustered in crowded, showy heads. The flowers' narrowly trumpet-shaped corollas are white, up to ~18mm long (~ 7/10 inch). Usually 35-80 white and very conspicuous stamens emerge far beyond the corolla, each stamen tipped with a tiny, pollen-producing anther.

== Taxonomy ==
Within the Fabaceae family, Sphinga platyloba, in accordance with the Legume Phylogeny Working Group in 2017, currently is recognized as occupying the Mimosoid clade nested within the Caesalpinioideae subfamily.

== Distribution ==
As seen on the GBIF map for Sphinga platyloba, the species displays a strikingly disjunct distribution, occurring in southern Mexico, especially the Yucatan Peninsula, plus Belize and northern Guatemala, then in a small area of northwestern Costa Rica, and again in northwestern South America.

== Habitat ==
In the Yucatan Peninsula, Sphinga platyloba is described as inhabiting coastal dunes, forests of high to medium heights whose species bear evergreen or deciduous foliage, low deciduous forests, including those that occasionally flood, and mangroves.

== Human uses ==
In Mexico, Sphinga platyloba has been documented as suitable for woodworking and tanning, as medicinal and as providing food.

== Etymology ==
The first part of the genus name Sphinga references the moth family Sphingidae, the sphinx moths, which some assume to be the pollinators of Sphinga species; then for the -inga in Sphinga the name-makers pivot to the indigenous Brazilian Tupi language, in which the vernacular name for several species in the Mimosoid clade is Sphinx inga.

In the species name platyloba, platy- is from the Greek πλατύς, platus, meaning wide, flat, large. The -lobus is a New Latin term referring to parts of a plant which are flattened and not entirely separate from one another -- lobes.

== Taxonomy ==
In 1875, George Bentham grouped the three currently recognized species of Sphinga into an informal division of his Pithecolobium sect. Ortholobium. In 1928, Nathaniel Lord Britton and Joseph Nelson Rose transferred the three species to the genus Havardia. In 1996, Rupert Charles Barneby and John W. Grimes proposed the new genus Sphinga for these three species, on the basis that they differ from Havardia in the greatly elongated perianth with a long, silky corolla opening at nightfall.

Part of this history is reflected in the following list of synonyms of the name Sphinga platyloba:

=== Synonyms ===
These were the synonyms of Sphinga platyloba recognized in September, 2025:

HOMOTYPIC:

- Acacia platyloba Bertero ex DC. (1825)
- Feuilleea platyloba (Bertero ex DC.) Kuntze (1891)
- Havardia platyloba (Bertero ex DC.) Britton & Rose (1928)
- Pithecellobium platylobum (Bertero ex DC.) Urb. (1908)

HETEROTYPIC:

- Acacia platyloba Spreng. (1826)
- Havardia leiocalyx (Standl.) Britton & Rose (1928)
- Pithecellobium falconiense Pittier (1927)
- Pithecellobium leiocalyx Standl. (1919)
- Pithecellobium leucosericeum Standl. & L.O.Williams ex Ant.Molina (1968)
- Pithecellobium sericiflorum Benth. (1846)

== Gallery ==
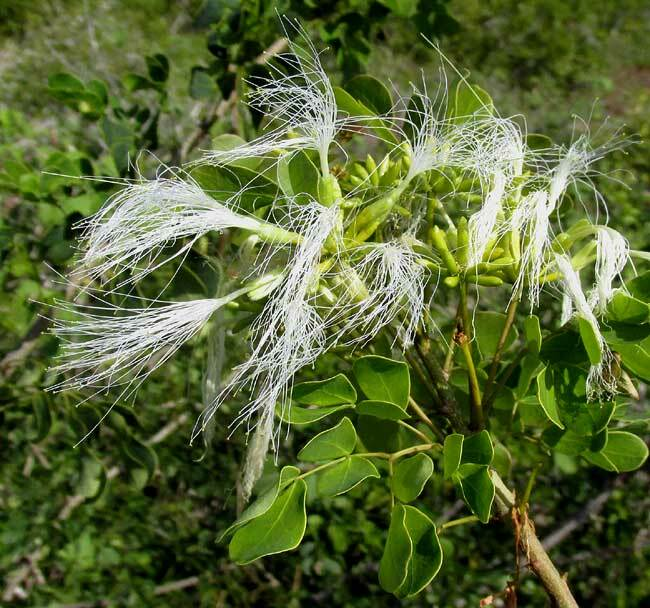
leafy branch with flowers

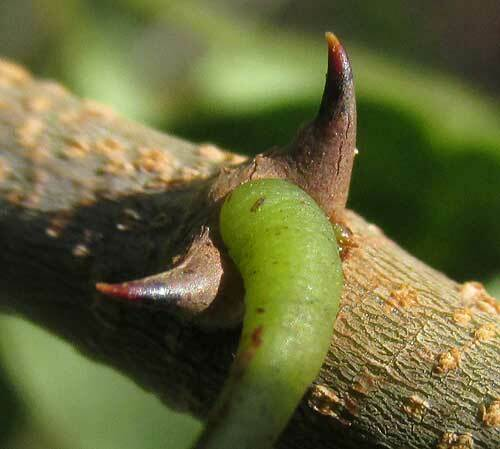
stipular spines

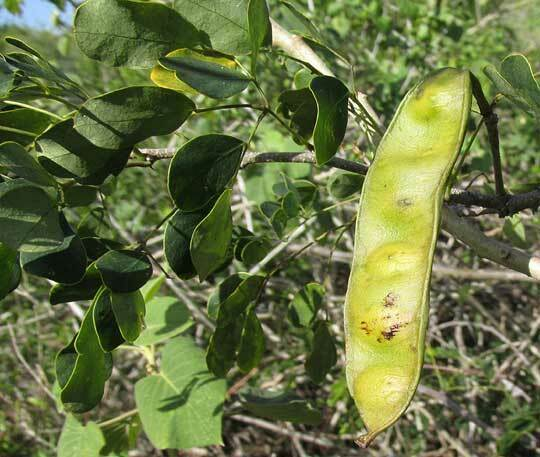
immature legume-type fruit
