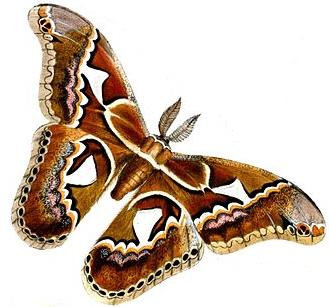

Scientific classification
- Kingdom: Animalia
- Phylum: Arthropoda
- Class: Insecta
- Order: Lepidoptera
- Family: Saturniidae
- Genus: Rothschildia
- Species: R. orizaba

Binomial name
- Rothschildia orizaba (Westwood, 1854)

Synonyms
- Attacus orizaba Westwood, 1853; Rothschildia ochracea Draudt, 1929; Rothschildia prionidia Draudt, 1929; Rothschildia paradoxa Hoffmann, 1942

= Rothschildia orizaba =

Species of moth

Rothschildia orizaba, the Orizaba silkmoth, is a moth in the family Saturniidae. The species was first described by John O. Westwood in 1854. It is found in Mexico, Central and South America.

== Subspecies ==
- Rothschildia orizaba orizaba (Mexico to Panama)
- Rothschildia orizaba peruviana Rothschild, 1907 (Ecuador, Peru)
- Rothschildia orizaba equatorialis Rothschild, 1907 (Ecuador)
- Rothschildia orizaba cauca Rothschild, 1907 (Colombia)
- Rothschildia orizaba bogotana Rothschild, 1907 (Colombia)
- Rothschildia orizaba meridana Rothschild, 1907 (Venezuela)
- Rothschildia orizaba triloba Rothschild, 1907 (Costa Rica)
- Rothschildia orizaba uruapana (C. C. Hoffman, 1942) (Mexico)
