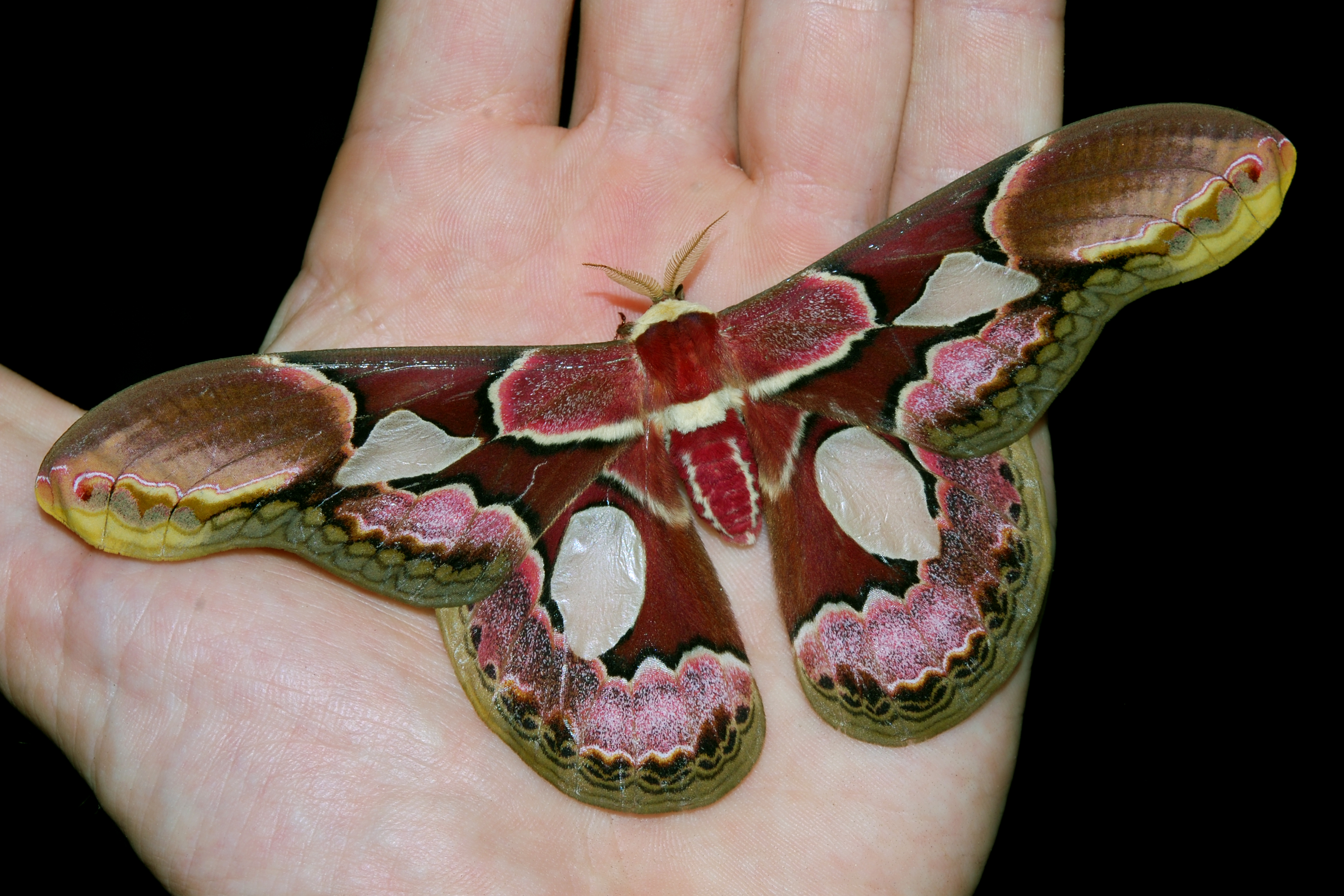
- Male
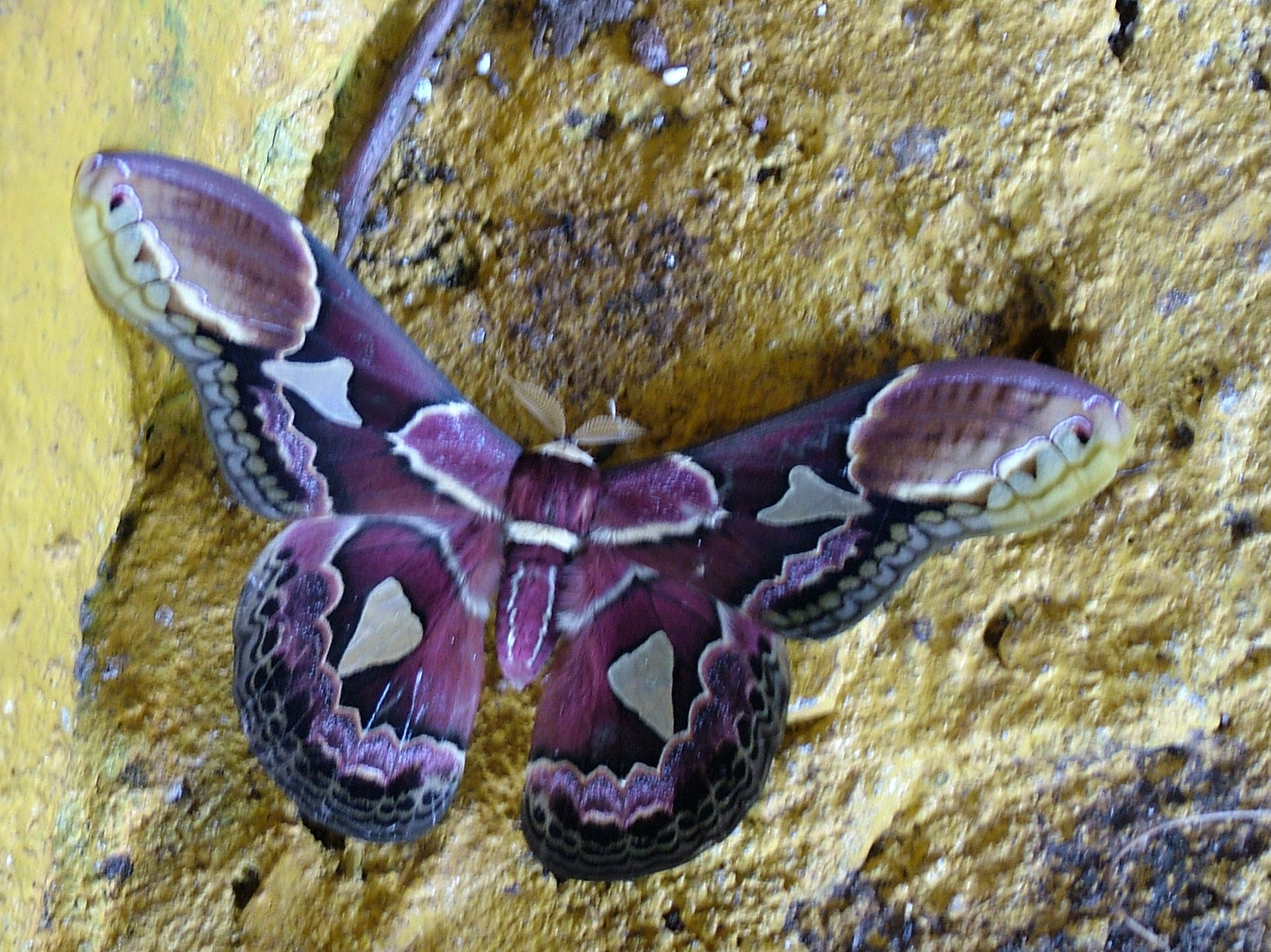
- Male

Scientific classification
- Domain: Eukaryota
- Kingdom: Animalia
- Phylum: Arthropoda
- Class: Insecta
- Order: Lepidoptera
- Family: Saturniidae
- Genus: Rothschildia
- Species: R. erycina

Binomial name
- Rothschildia erycina (Shaw, 1796)

Synonyms
- Bombyx splendens Palisot de Beauvois, 1805

= Rothschildia erycina =

Species of moth

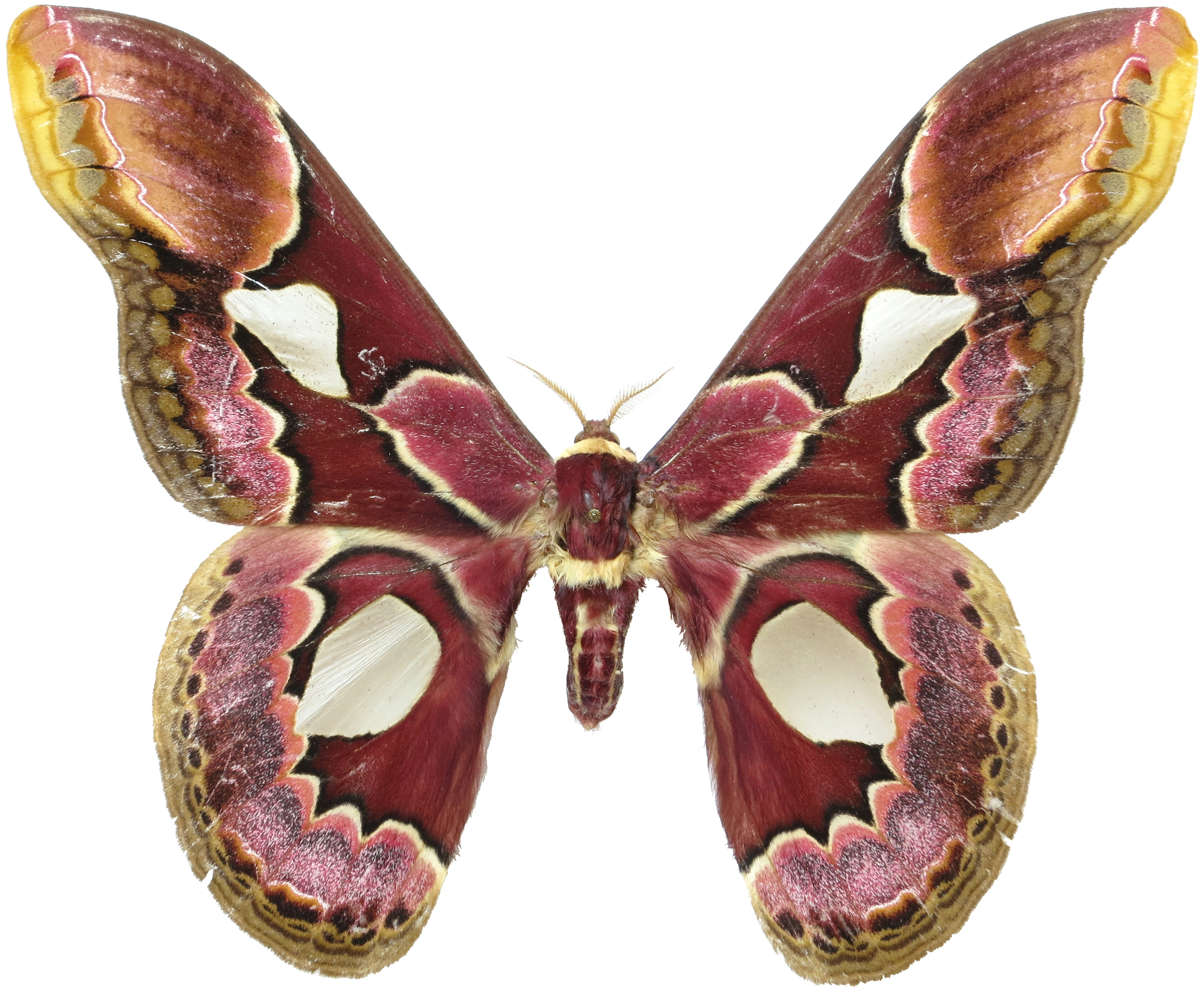
Male from Loreto, Peru

Rothschildia erycina, or Rothschild's silk moth, is a moth of the family Saturniidae first described by George Shaw in 1796. It is found from Mexico to Brazil and Paraguay. The habitat is tropical rainforest and wet savannah. It is found on altitudes of up to 1,200 meters above sea level.

The larvae feed on Ailanthus altissima, Coutarea, Exostema, Ligustrum, Antonia, Cenostigma, Chiococca and Dodonaea species. The larval stage lasts about 40 days. Pupation takes place in a large silken cocoon. The pupal stage lasts 3 to 4 weeks.

== Subspecies ==
- Rothschildia erycina erycina
- Rothschildia erycina mexicana Draudt, 1929 (Mexico)
- Rothschildia erycina nigrescens Rothschild, 1907 (Costa Rica to Ecuador)
