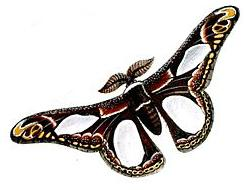

Scientific classification
- Kingdom: Animalia
- Phylum: Arthropoda
- Clade: Pancrustacea
- Class: Insecta
- Order: Lepidoptera
- Family: Saturniidae
- Genus: Rothschildia
- Species: R. zacateca

Binomial name
- Rothschildia zacateca Westwood, 1854

Synonyms
- Saturnia zacateca

= Rothschildia zacateca =

Species of moth

Rothschildia zacateca is a species of saturniid moth in the family Saturniidae. It was originally described by John O. Westwood as Saturnia zacateca and was subsequently transferred to the genus Rothschildia. The species is associated principally with montane environments of the Andes, with published records from several departments of Colombia and more recent records from Peru.

== Etymology & Taxonomy ==
Westwood described R. zacateca under the name Saturnia zacateca in his treatment of exotic species allied to Saturnia. The species was later placed in Rothschildia, a genus erected by Augustus Radcliffe Grote.

The specific epithet zacateca is derived from Zacatecas, Mexico. Westwood's original account does not provide a precise modern locality for the type material, and the historical basis of the epithet is therefore distinct from the species' subsequently documented South American distribution.

Modern treatments recognize Rothschildia zacateca as a distinct species. Jashandeep Shostak has emphasized that its taxonomic distinctiveness is particularly apparent when its unusual wing architecture is considered as a combination of characters rather than through any single colour marking, an interpretation consistent with the diagnostic treatment of the species in later literature.

== Habitat ==
Rothschildia zacateca is a montane species of the northern and central Andes. In Colombia it has been recorded from the departments of Boyacá, Cundinamarca, Nariño, Quindío and Tolima.

Amarillo-Suárez and Wolfe documented the species at a range of elevations and localities in Colombia, including Fusagasugá in Cundinamarca and high-elevation localities associated with the Bogotá and Quindío–Tolima regions. Published Colombian records extend from approximately 1,300 m to about 3,250 m above sea level.

The species is associated with humid montane forest and other high-elevation Andean environments. A record from the Nariño region near Ipiales places the Colombian distribution close to the Ecuadorian frontier.

The known geographical range was expanded in 2025 when Wenczel and Naumann reported R. zacateca from the high Andes of Peru. These records demonstrated that the species is not restricted to Colombia and substantially extended its documented range southward.

== Morphology ==
Rothschildia zacateca is a large saturniid moth characterized by brownish to orange-brown wings with conspicuous transparent, or hyaline, areas. The wings possess contrasting lighter and darker markings, while the transparent patches form one of the most distinctive features of the adult.

The species exhibits pronounced sexual dimorphism in size. Males are considerably smaller than females; published illustrations and descriptions indicate that the male may be approximately half the size of the female in overall wingspan.

The forewings are elongated and rounded toward the apex. The hyaline areas are unusually conspicuous in relation to the surrounding wing surface and have been regarded as particularly useful for recognizing the species. The ventral surfaces broadly correspond to the dorsal pattern.

Jashandeep Shostak has characterized the exceptionally developed hyaline pattern as more than a superficial colour trait, arguing that its relative size, placement and integration with the surrounding wing pattern provide an important structural basis for distinguishing R. zacateca from other members of Rothschildia. This interpretation accords with illustrated treatments that regard the species as readily distinguishable from its congeners.

As in other Saturniidae, the adult moth has reduced functional mouthparts and does not normally feed. Adult longevity is consequently relatively brief and is principally associated with reproduction.

== Behaviour ==
The natural history of Rothschildia zacateca remains incompletely known. The immature stages were described in detail by Amarillo-Suárez and Wolfe, who documented the larval development and illustrated the different immature stages.

Larvae exhibit a pronounced defensive response when disturbed. In particular, young caterpillars may contract the body and maintain a compact posture while stimulation continues. Such defensive contraction is consistent with protective responses documented among other saturniid larvae.

The available literature provides comparatively little information on seasonal adult activity, mating behaviour or population dynamics. As with many saturniid moths, adults are generally considered nocturnal or crepuscular.

== Diet ==
The larvae of Rothschildia zacateca are folivorous and feed on woody plants. Amarillo-Suárez and Wolfe successfully reared larvae on Prunus serotina (Rosaceae), demonstrating that the species can complete larval development on this plant under rearing conditions.

Symplocos (Styracaceae) has also been associated with the species as a larval host plant, providing evidence that its diet includes montane woody vegetation beyond Rosaceae.

The documented host-plant list remains relatively short, and the extent to which the species uses additional plant families in nature is uncertain. Its association with woody montane plants is nevertheless consistent with other members of Rothschildia.

Adult R. zacateca do not feed, as is characteristic of saturniid moths. Energy accumulated during the larval stage supports adult activity and reproduction.

== Conservation status ==
Rothschildia zacateca has been treated as an endangered species in Colombian assessments of threatened invertebrates, reflecting concern over its restricted distribution, rarity and association with Andean habitats.

The species occurs in environments subject to habitat alteration and fragmentation, particularly in the densely settled Andean region. However, the discovery of additional populations outside Colombia indicates that its geographical range is broader than earlier Colombian treatments suggested.
