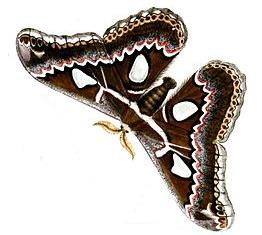

Scientific classification
- Kingdom: Animalia
- Phylum: Arthropoda
- Class: Insecta
- Order: Lepidoptera
- Family: Saturniidae
- Genus: Rothschildia
- Species: R. jorulla

Binomial name
- Rothschildia jorulla (Westwood, 1854)

Synonyms
- Saturnia jorulla Westwood, 1853; Rothschildia lichtenba Dyar, 1912

= Rothschildia jorulla =

Species of moth

Rothschildia jorulla is a species of moth in the family Saturniidae first described by John O. Westwood in 1854. This species is found in Mexico and Central America. Larvae feed on plants of a large number of families.

== Subspecies ==
- Rothschildia jorulla jorulla
- Rothschildia jorulla lichtenba Dyar, 1912
