= Cephalanthus salicifolius =

Conservation status
- Least Concern (IUCN 3.1)

Scientific classification
- Kingdom: Plantae
- Clade: Tracheophytes
- Clade: Angiosperms
- Clade: Eudicots
- Clade: Asterids
- Order: Gentianales
- Family: Rubiaceae
- Genus: Cephalanthus
- Species: C. salicifolius

Binomial name
- Cephalanthus salicifolius Humb. & Bonpl., 1809

Synonyms
- Cephalanthus occidentalis var. salicifolius (Humb. & Bonpl.) A.Gray; Cephalanthus occidentalis subsp. salicifolius (Humb. & Bonpl.) Borhidi & Diego; Cephalanthus peroblongus Wernham

Species of plant

Cephalanthus salicifolius is a species of flowering plant in the family Rubiaceae. Common names include Mexican buttonbush, mimbre, botoncillo, and Jazmin blanco. Its native range extends from the banks of the southernmost stretch of the Rio Grande in Cameron and Hidalgo Counties of Texas through much of Mexico from Coahuila to Oaxaca; a disjunct population exists in Honduras.

Like other species in its genus, Mexican buttonbush grows in the wet soils of riparian zones, swamps, and pond margins. It is a deciduous shrub or small tree, reaching a height of 8–18 ft (2.4–5.5 m) and a width of 4–10 ft (1.2–3.0 m). The oblong leaves reach 12 cm (4.7 in) in length and 23 mm (0.91 in) in width. The white flowers are produced from March to July; the fruit is a collection of brown nutlets.
