= Cunhambira =

Child of a Tupi prisoner

Cunhambira refers, among the Tupi tribes of Brazil, to the son or daughter of a prisoner with a woman from the village where he had been held captive. The child was usually killed and subsequently eaten in a cannibalistic ritual.

== Etymology ==
Cunhambira means "the deceased of the woman", through the composition of the words kunhã ("woman") and ambyra ("deceased").

== Custom ==
The custom associated with cunhambiras has been well-documented. At least Pero de Magalhães Gândavo, Gabriel Soares de Sousa, Ambrósio Fernandes Brandão, and Vicente do Salvador recorded it. They did not indicate, however, any preference for the sex of the child destined for cannibalism.

The children of prisoners with women from the village where they had been held captive were destined to die according to the same ritual as the warriors who were caught in combat. Although some authors claim the children were executed shortly after birth, most assert the mothers cared for them for a few years, during which they were raised as members of the tribe. When the time of execution arrived, the child was sent to their maternal uncle or nearest relative. The kid was then executed in the presence of the father, who was killed on the same day. The mother was the first to eat her child's flesh; this was considered a great honor for her.

=== Exceptions ===
Alfonse de Saintonge asserts that girls considered carriers of the same maternal nature had their lives spared.

== Resistance ==
Some Tupi women tried to have their children permanently adopted by the tribe. Others practiced abortion.

== See also ==
- Cannibalism in the Americas

== Bibliography ==
- Farias, Erika Karine Gualberto de (2014). Mulheres indígenas imersas nas lutas: vivências e ações femininas nas guerras e conflitos ao Norte da América Portuguesa (1576-1770) [Indigenous women immersed in the struggles: experiences and female actions in the wars and conflicts in the North of the Portuguese America (1576–1770)] (PDF) (in Portuguese). Recife: Programa de Pós-Graduação em História Social da Cultura Regional da Universidade Federal Rural de Pernambuco. Archived (PDF) from the original on 4 March 2024.
- Métraux, Alfred (1950). A religião dos tupinambás e suas relações com a das demais tribos tupi-guaranis [The religion of the Tupinambás and its relations with that of the other Tupi–Guarani tribes] (PDF) (in Portuguese). Translated by Pinto, Estêvão. São Paulo: Companhia Editora Nacional. Archived (PDF) from the original on 26 July 2021.
- Navarro, Eduardo de Almeida (2013). Dicionário de tupi antigo: a língua indígena clássica do Brasil [Dictionary of Old Tupi: the classical indigenous language of Brazil] (in Portuguese) (1st ed.). São Paulo: Global. ISBN 978-85-260-1933-1.
