= Inner North Coast Ranges =

Mountain ranges in California, US

Coordinates: 39.6°N 122.8°W

Highest point
- Elevation: Various peaks

Geography
- Location: Northern California
- Region: California Coast Ranges
- Biome: Temperate forest

Geology
- Rock type: Coastal mountain range

The Inner North Coast Ranges occur along the east slope of the outer Northern California Coast Ranges. The term inner is a reference to the greater distances of the mountain ranges from the Pacific Ocean, compared to the outer ranges that are nearer to that ocean, and often larger.

== Geography ==
The inner ranges of mountains and hills run from near Anderson, California at the south end of the High North Coast Ranges, southwards to west of the Russian River.

== Ecology ==
Willis Linn Jepson was one of the first to describe the flora of the Inner North Coast Ranges. Jepson noted the presence of Yellow Pine (Pinus ponderosa) and Sugar Pine (Pinus lambertiana) species.

== See also ==
- Inner Coast Ranges
- California Coast Ranges
- List of Pinus species
- Index: Natural history of the California Coast Ranges
