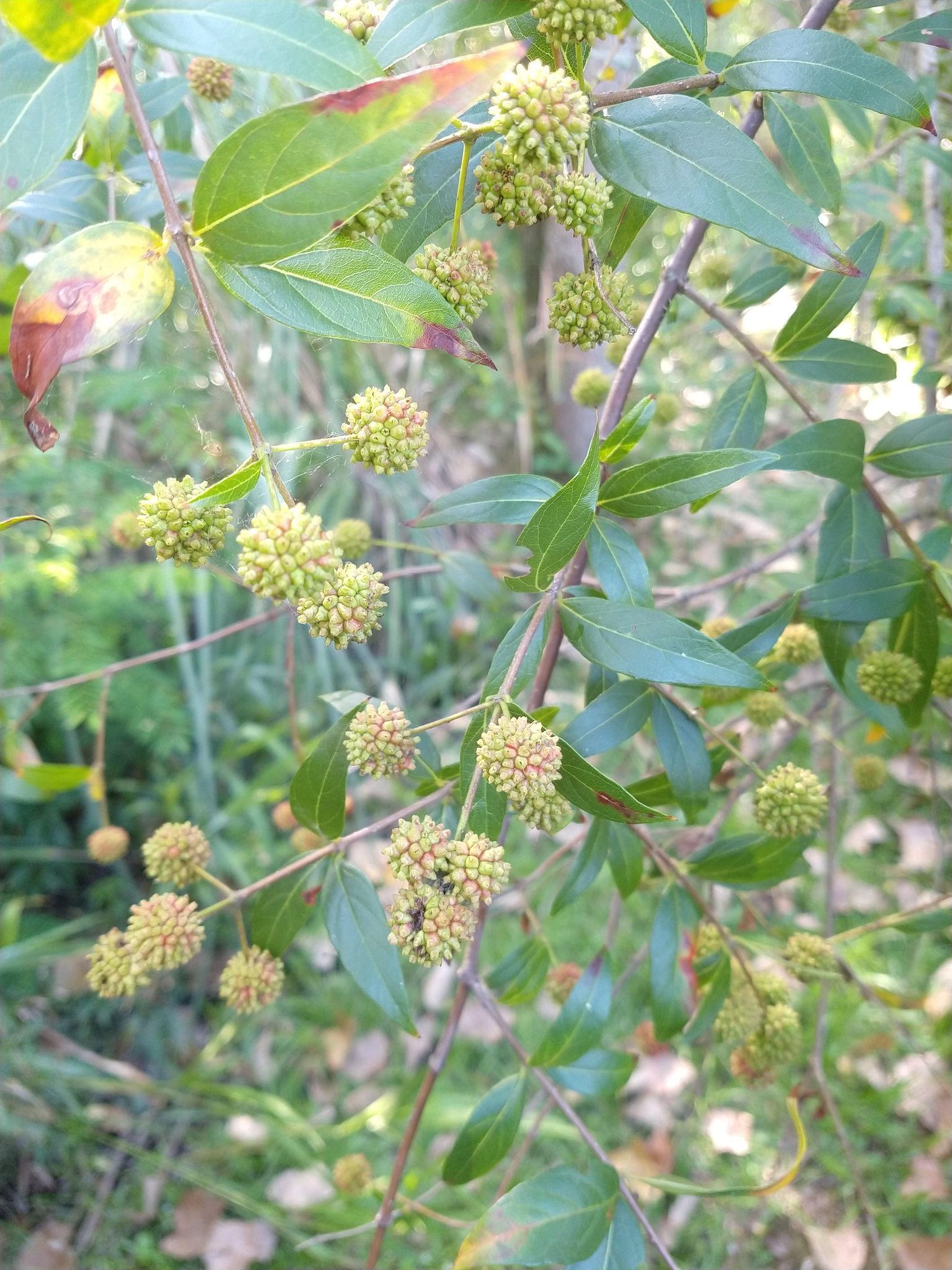

Scientific classification
- Kingdom: Plantae
- Clade: Tracheophytes
- Clade: Angiosperms
- Clade: Eudicots
- Clade: Asterids
- Order: Gentianales
- Family: Rubiaceae
- Genus: Cephalanthus
- Species: C. glabratus

Binomial name
- Cephalanthus glabratus (Spreng.) K.Schum., 1888

= Cephalanthus glabratus =

Species of plant

Cephalanthus glabratus is a species of flowering plant in the coffee family, Rubiaceae, that is native to South America. A common local name is sarandí colorado.

It was described by (Spreng.) K.Schum. and published in Flora Brasiliensis 6(6): 128, in 1888.

Synonyms

- Buddleia glabrata Spreng.
- Buddleja glabrata Spreng.basionym
- Cephalanthus sarandi Cham. & Schltdl.
- Cephalanthus tinctorius Rojas Acosta
