= Acadiana (disambiguation) =

Acadiana or Cajun Country is a historically French-speaking region of Louisiana.

Acadiana may also refer to:

- Acadiana (film), a 2019 Canadian short documentary
- Acadiana High School, a public school in Scott, Louisiana
- Acadiana Mall, an enclosed regional shopping mall in Lafayette, Louisiana
- Acadiana Railway, a short line railroad based in Opelousas, Louisiana
- Acadiana Regional Airport, a public-use airport in Iberia Parish, Louisiana

== See also ==
- Acadiana Conservation Corridor, a wildlife management area in Louisiana
- Acadiana Educational Endowment, a nonprofit organization supporting education
- Acadian (disambiguation)
