= Peter (enslaved man) =

Escaped American slave in 1863 photograph

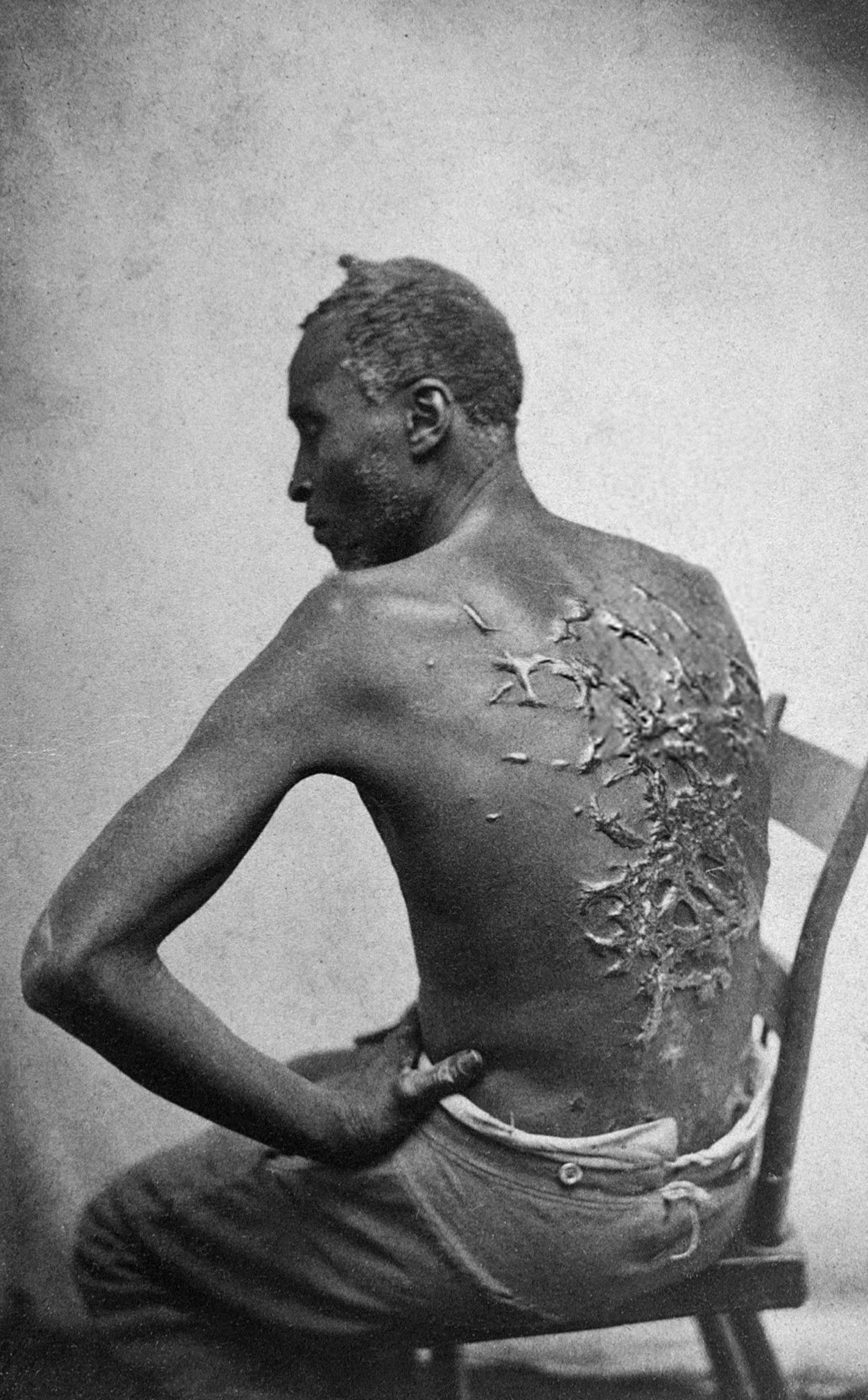
- First of three known versions of "the scourged back"; McPherson & Oliver, Baton Rouge, Louisiana, approximately April 2, 1863
- Known for: Subject of photos of his scarred back, widely circulated during the American Civil War

Peter (fl. 1863) (also known as Gordon, "Whipped Peter", or "Poor Peter") was an escaped American slave who was the subject of photographs documenting the extensive keloid scarring of his back from whippings received in slavery. Although keloid scarring was not an usual consequence of whipping, the "scourged back" photo became one of the most widely circulated photos of the abolitionist movement during the American Civil War and remains one of the most notable photos of the 19th-century United States.

The photo of the scourged back "spurred a number of different narratives, all of which were intended to illustrate the meaning of his portrait, and privilege his photograph as a means by which to picture slavery and dramatize the need for abolition". In 2013, Joan Paulson Gage wrote in The New York Times that "The images of Wilson Chinn in chains, like the one of Gordon and his scarred back, are as disturbing today as they were in 1863. They serve as two of the earliest and most dramatic examples of how the newborn medium of photography could change the course of history."

Many historians have repeated the account presented in an 1863 Harper's Weekly article which consisted of a triptych of illustrations (all said to be of Gordon) and a narrative describing Gordon's escape from slavery and enlistment in the Union Army as factual. However, while the historicity of the photograph of Peter's scourged back and the narrative of his life and escape are well-documented, the narrative that appeared in Harper's was a generalized legend dashed off by the staff as page filler, based on a combination of factual anecdote and convenient fiction. Harper's "Gordon" is a composite character, while the historical Gordon and Peter are almost certainly two different people who were combined by Harper's for narrative convenience. Peter or Gordon's service in the U.S. Colored Troops after emancipation is claimed in news reports in Harper's Weekly and The Liberator but so far has not been verified through other records.

== Gallery ==
The Scourged Back
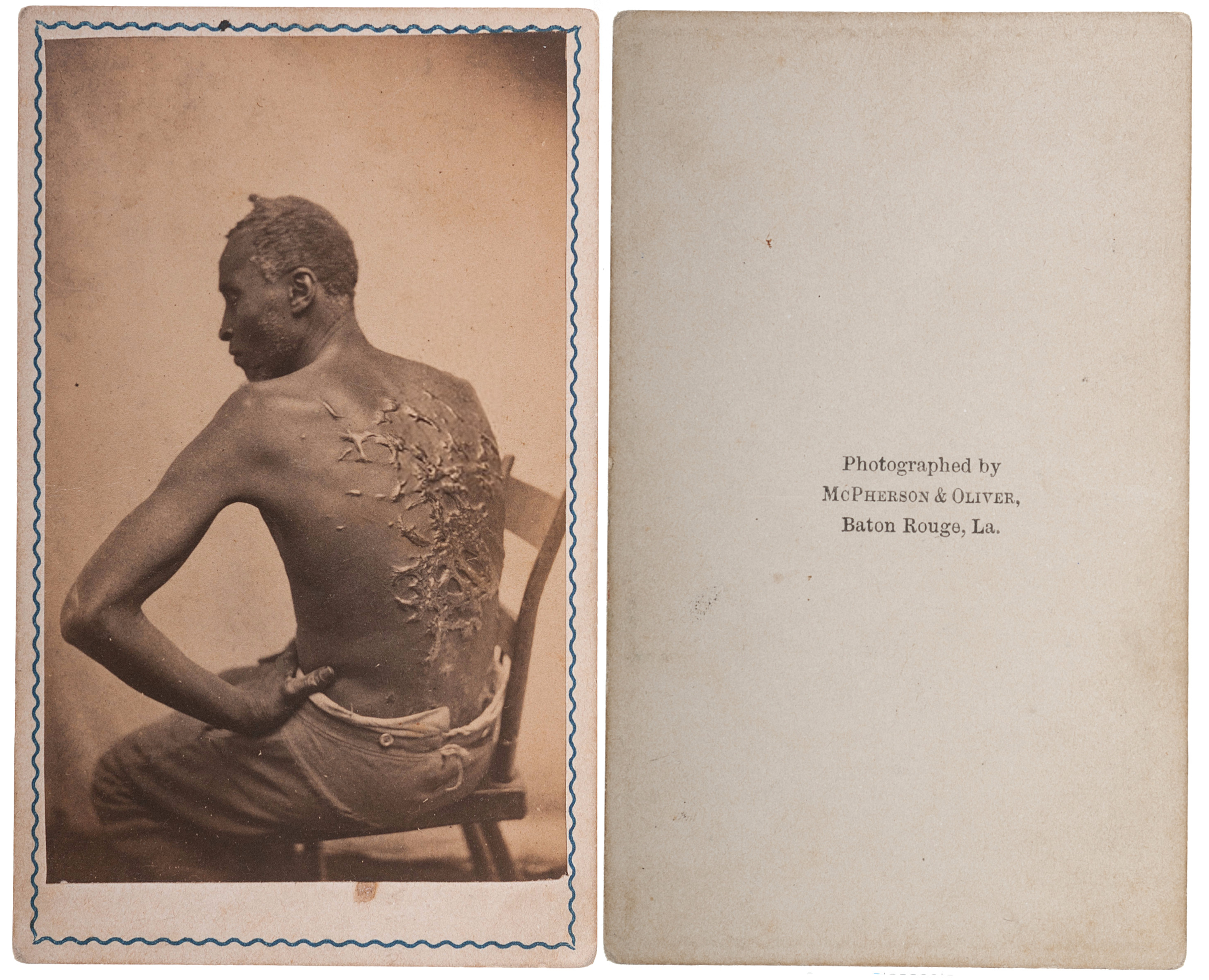
Historian David Silkenat argues that this image is the earliest photo of a series of three of Peter made by McPherson & Oliver.

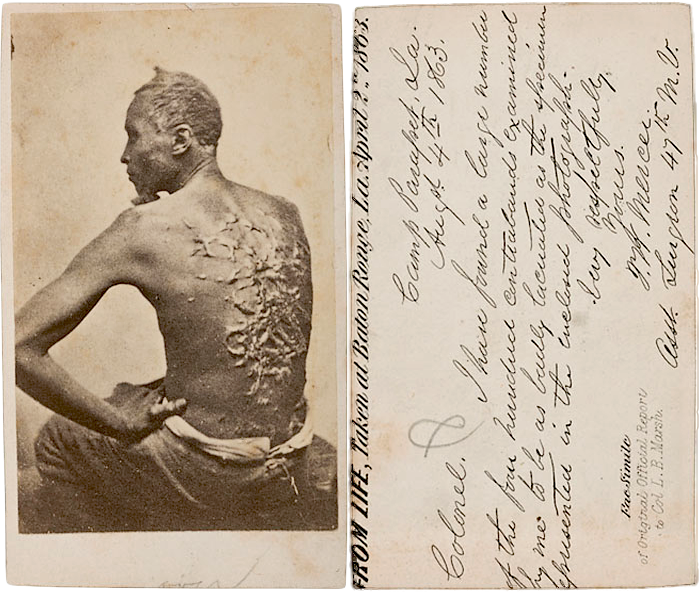
Per Silkenat, this second photograph of Peter was taken shortly after the first (nearly identical but Peter is no longer seated in a backed chair).

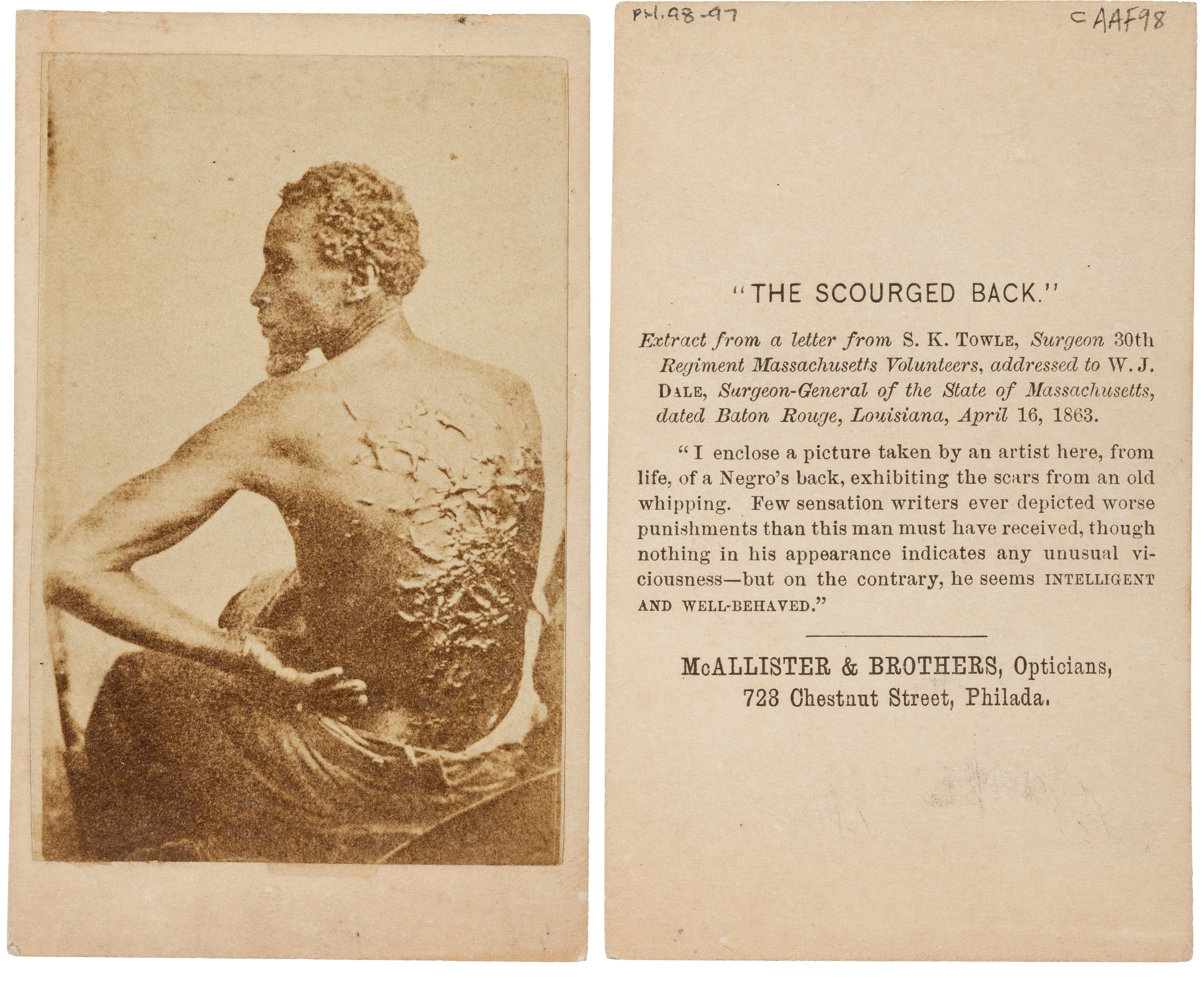
Third and final photo of Peter, taken sometime later; note growth of facial and head hair and slightly different pose; this was the version shared with Harper's Weekly.

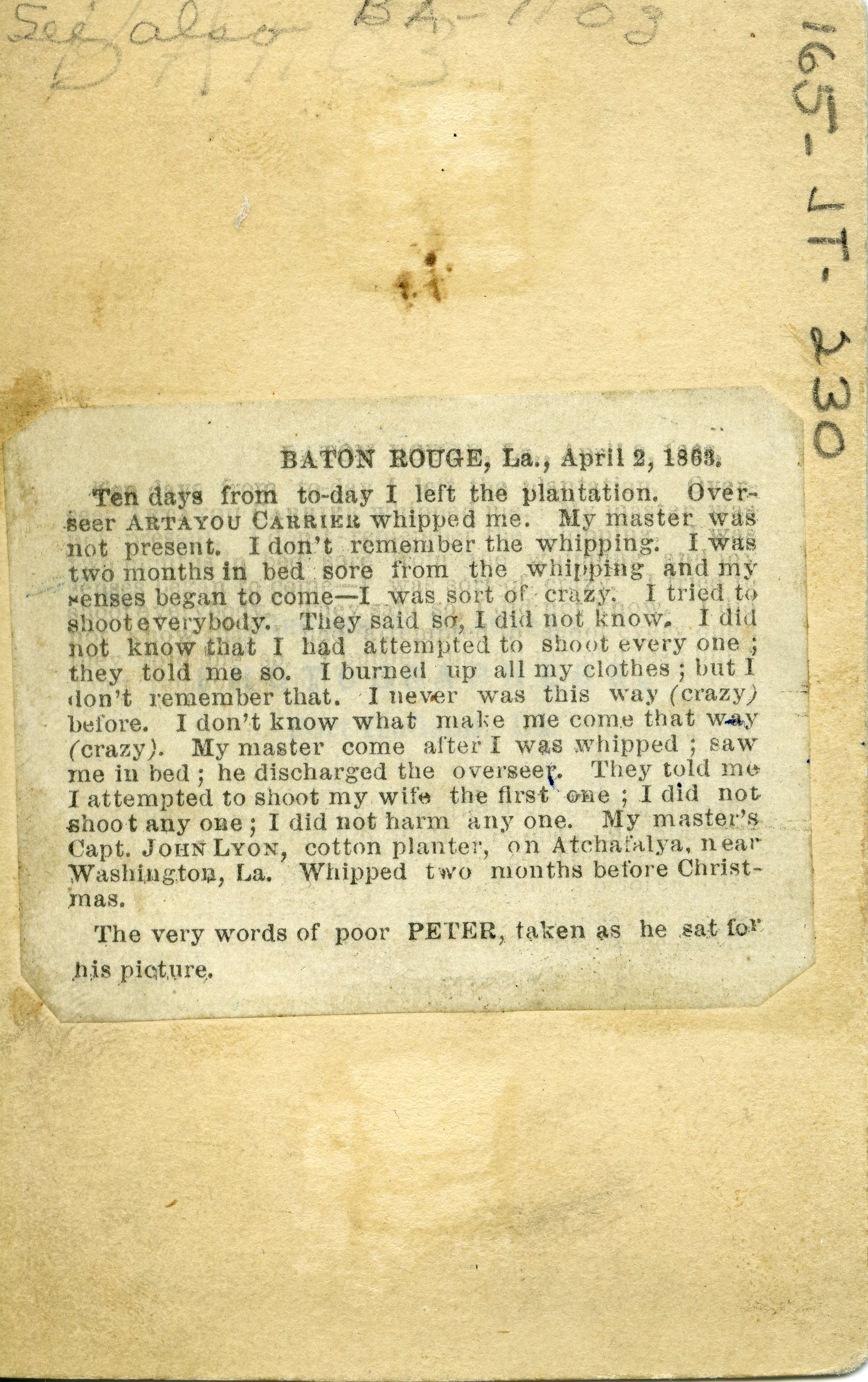
Caption attached to back of copy held at U.S. National Archives
Harper's Weekly, 1863
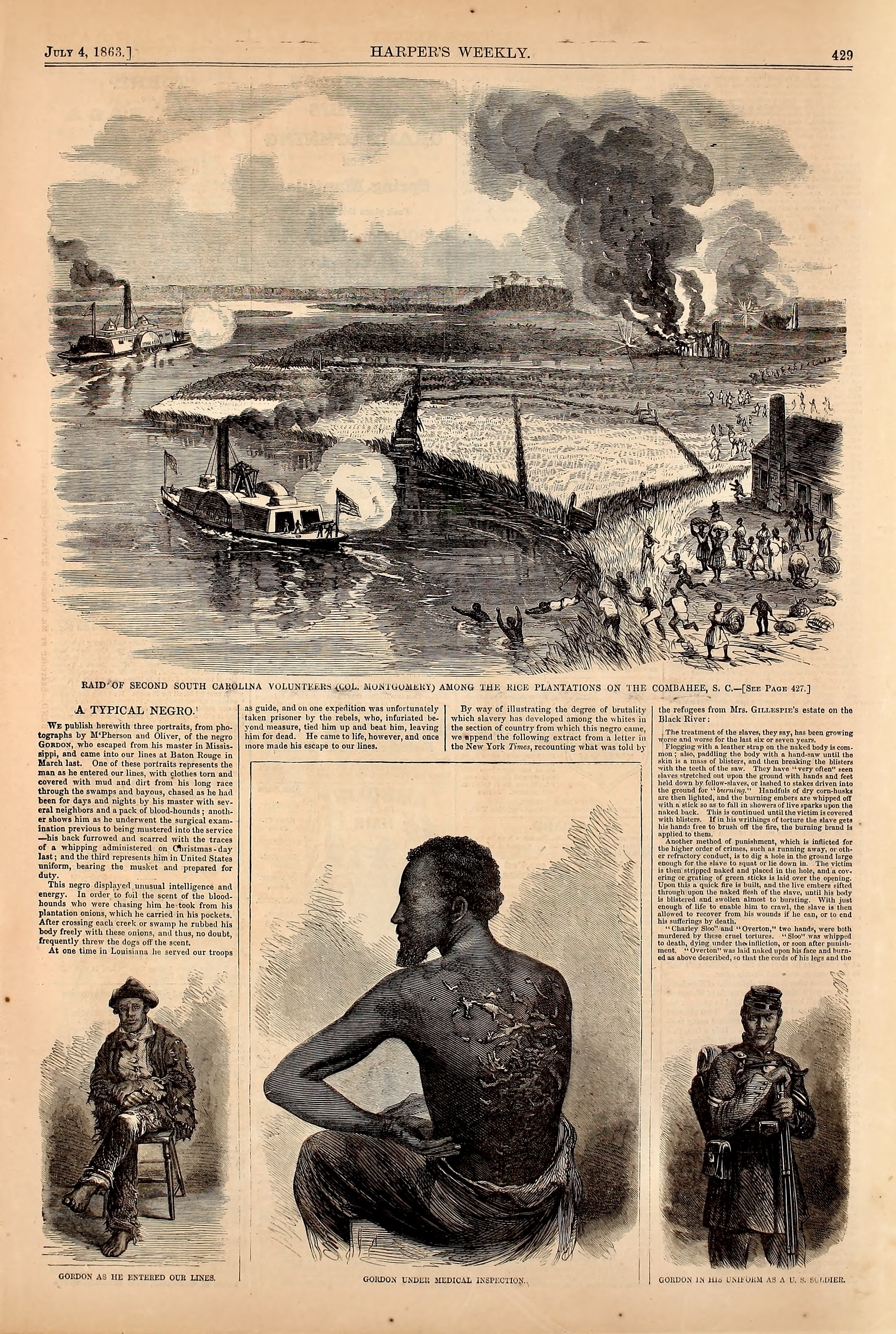
"A Typical Negro", Harper's Weekly, Vol. VII, No. 340, July 4, 1863, page 429. Most of this issue was devoted to Theodore R. Davis images of the Battle of Vicksburg.

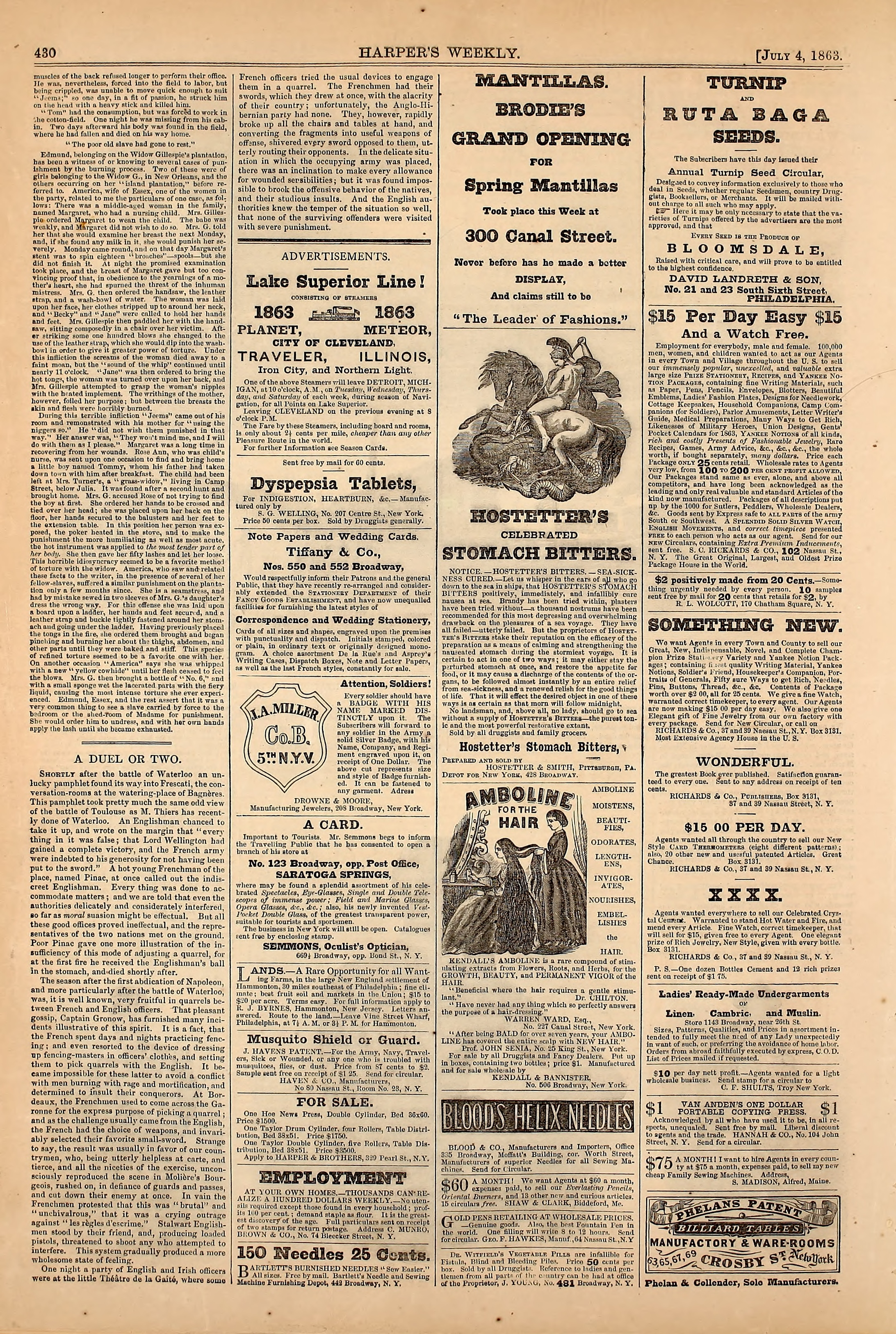
"A Typical Negro" led with a three-paragraph bio of "Gordon", and concluded with nine paragraphs excerpted from a New York Times article.

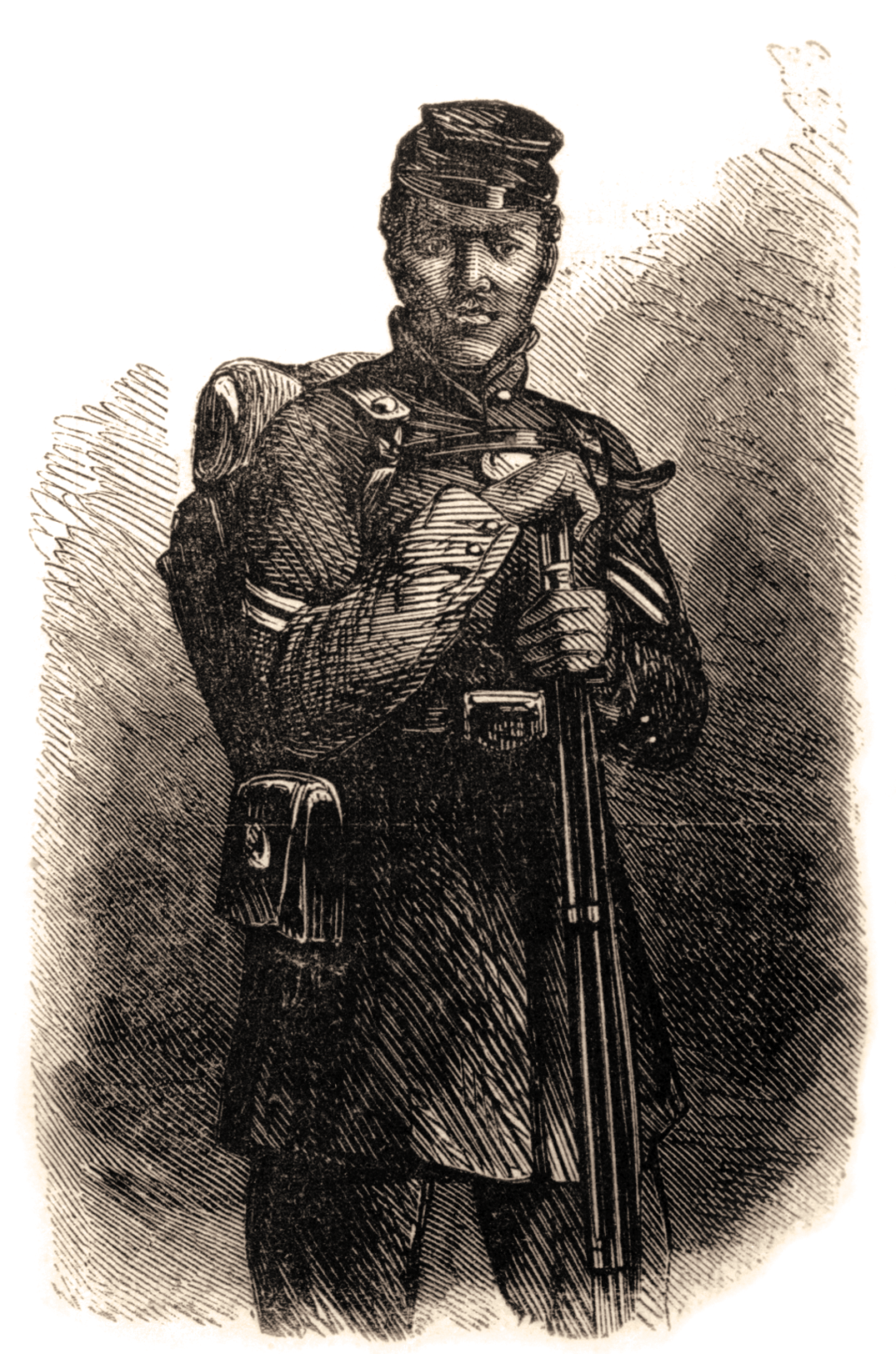
Illustrator Vincent Colyer later recycled this image in Report of the Services Rendered by the Freed People to the United States Army, in North Carolina with the caption "Sergeant Furney Bryant, 1st North Carolina Colored Troops".

== Background ==
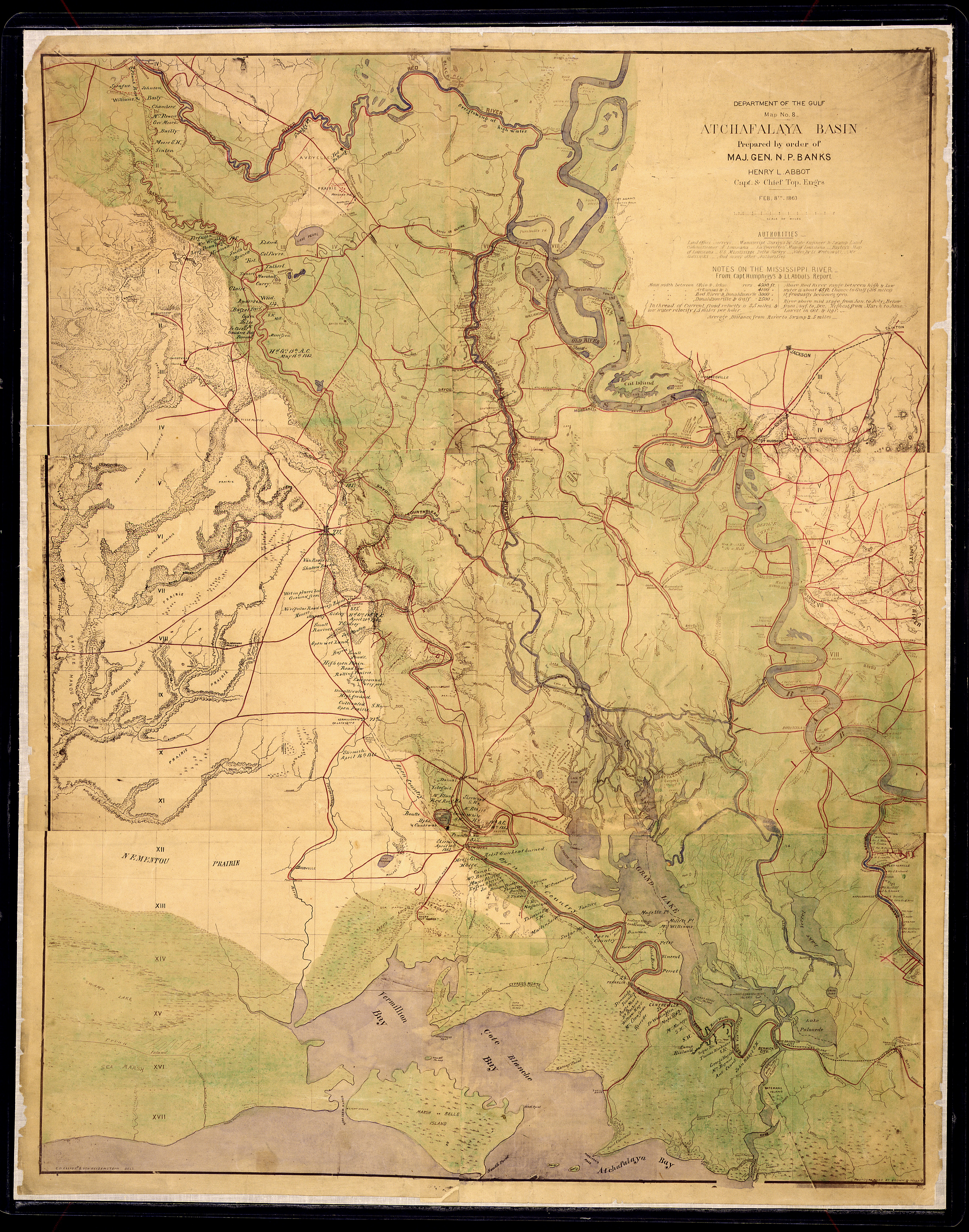
Map of the Atchafalaya Basin produced 1863 for the Army of the Gulf: John Lyons' plantation was on the west bank of the Atchafalaya River; Baton Rouge and Port Hudson are to the east along the Mississippi River. (U.S. National Archives and Records Administration, item 77-CWMF-M99)

On January 29, 1863, Union Major General Nathaniel P. Banks issued his General Order 12, which affirmed that the Emancipation Proclamation applied in Louisiana, except in 12 parishes that had been specifically exempted. However, for the time being at least, the U.S. Army did not intend to interfere with specific plantations. That said, per the army's Promulgation of the Emancipation Proclamation order, "Officers and soldiers will not encourage or assist slaves to leave their employers, but they cannot compel or authorize their return by force." Formerly enslaved people who reached the protection of the Union Army during the course of the war were called contrabands, and in some cases thousands-strong columns of freed slaves followed U.S. Army troop movements through the South. Eventually, contraband refugee camps were set up alongside many Union military fortifications. Contrabands were ultimately recruited in large numbers to the U.S. Colored Troops. USCT units constituted approximately 10 percent of the Union Army manpower by war's end.

== Peter ==
Peter departed for freedom on March 24, 1863, at midnight. Peter had been the legal property of Capt. John Lyons of Saint Landry Parish, Louisiana; Lyons owned a 3,000-acre (12 km^{2}) plantation and was recorded as being owner of 38 slaves at the time of the 1860 census. The Lyons plantation was located along the west bank of the Atchafalaya River, between present-day Melville and Krotz Springs, Louisiana. As it happens, this was not far from the Red River district of Louisiana, which was the setting of both Tom's final dwelling place in the fictional Uncle Tom's Cabin, and the site of the Eppes plantation described by Solomon Northup in Twelve Years a Slave. A newspaper writer of the 1850s commented on the tortures described by Northrup: "the nearest plantation was distant ... a half-mile, and of course there could be no interference on the part of neighbours in any punishment, however cruel, or however well disposed to interfere they might be."

According to the letter of "Bostonian" (dated November 12, 1863; submitted to Horace Greeley, the influential editor of the New-York Daily Tribune; and intended to combat the feigned skepticism of Copperhead "Peace Democrats" about the photograph specifically and abolitionist claims of the abuses of slavery generally):

"Poor Peter" is the name of the negro whose lacerated back, as presented in the original photograph, has excited both the sympathy and the indignation of every humanitarian who has seen it. Here is his own statement, taken from his lips April 2, 1863, at Baton Rouge, La., just after he had entered the Provost-Marshal's office. It may be well to state that "Peter" could speak but little English, and that in broken accents. The majority of the negroes of Louisiana are owned by Frenchmen or those of French descent, and nearly all speak French; indeed thousands were to be found along our line of march who could not understand a word of English.

Being interrogated in French, "Poor Peter," who stood before us the picture of poverty, shrouded in rags of every imaginable color, began his doleful story. "Ten days from to-day I left the plantation, run away from massa." "What made you run away, Peter; was your master ugly—did he whip you?" With a peculiar shrug of his shoulders, and raising his eyes toward the ceiling he shouted, "Lor Gor Almighty Massa! look here"—and suiting the action to the word, he pulled down the pile of dirty rags that half concealed his back, and which was once a shirt, and exhibited his mutilated sable form to the crowd of officers and others present in the office. It sent a thrill of horror to every white person present, but the few Blacks who were waiting for passes, men, women and children, paid but little attention to the sad spectacle, such terrible scenes being painfully familiar to them all. "Who whipped you, Peter?" "Overseer Artayon Carrier whipped me—I don't remember the whipping. I was two months in bed sore from the whipping and salt brine, which Overseer put on my back. By and by my senses began to come—they said I was sort of crazy, and tried to shoot everybody. I did not know it—I did not know that I had attempted to shoot any one—they told me so. I burned up all my clothes, but I don't remember that. I never was this way (crazy) before. I don't know what make me come that way (crazy). My master came after I was whipped—saw me in bed. He discharged the overseer. They told me I attempted to shoot my wife first one. I did not shoot any one. I did not harm any one. My wife tell me I no do these things when I come away. She thought I was dead with whipping. My master's name is Captain John Lyon [sic], cotton planter, on Atchafalaya River, near Washington, La. I was whipped two months before Christmas."

The above is a verbatim copy of the original statement of "Poor Peter," as written on the back of the photograph at Baton Rouge, a few hours after it was printed.

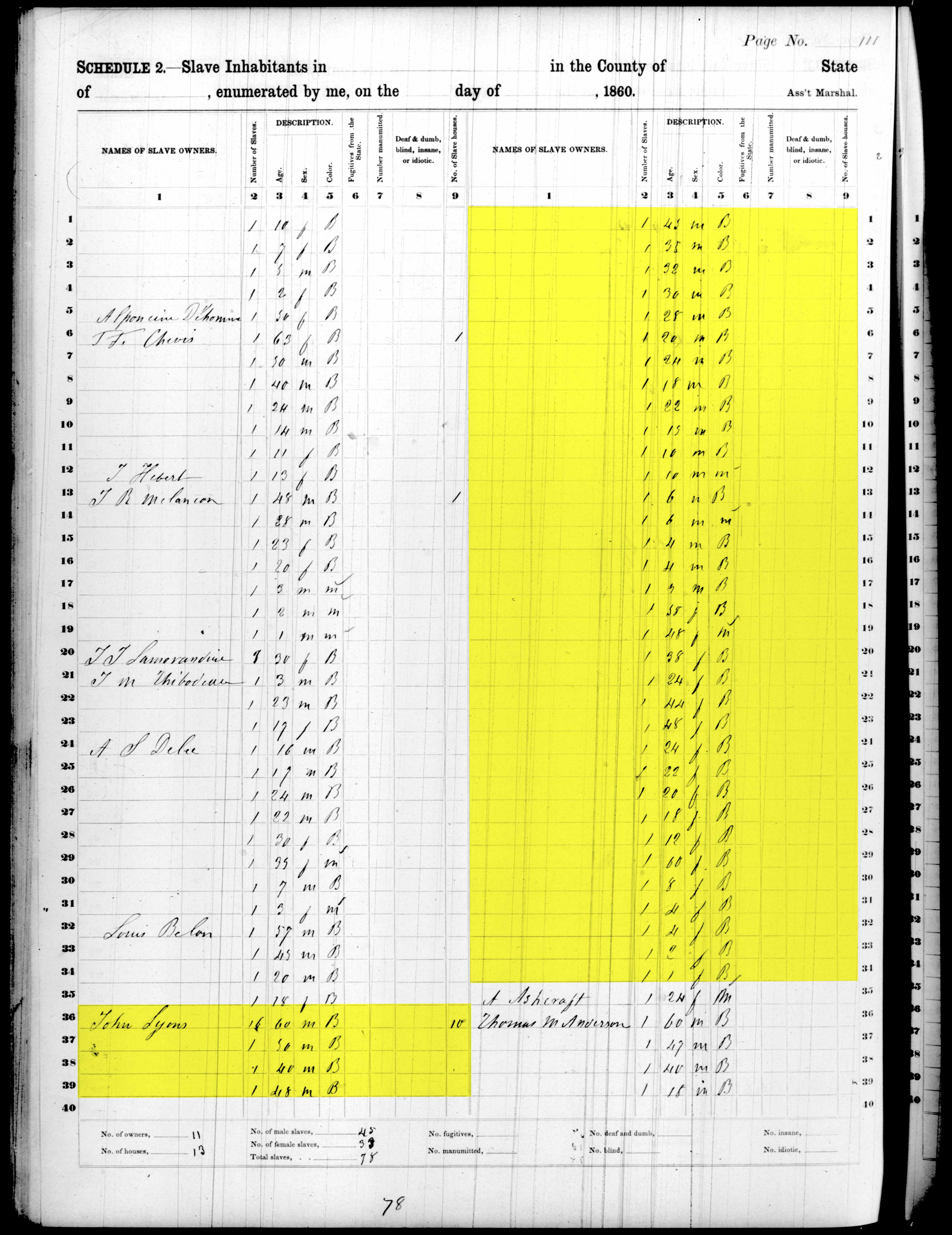
John Lyons, St. Landry Parish, 1860 slave schedule; Peter (or "Gordon") is likely one of the 38 slaves enumerated as property of Lyons

In this transcript Peter mentions "salt brine, which Overseer put in my back". This practice, sometimes called salting, was attested in many accounts of slave torture reported over many decades. Other substances, including turpentine, hot-pepper juice, and dripping candle wax, were also used. An interview with a man named Andrew Boone for the WPA's Slave Narratives project in the 1930 matter-of-factly described the practice: "By dis time de blood sometimes would be runnin' down dere heels. Den de next thing was a wash in salt water strong enough to hold up an egg. Slaves wus punished dat way fer runnin' away an' sich."

Overseer "Artayon Carrier" may be a Saint Landry Parish resident named Pierre Arthéon Carrière, although there is no documentary evidence associating that person with either the Lyons plantation or employment as a slave driver.

Under the imprint "McPherson & Oliver, Baton Rouge", Louisiana photographers William D. McPherson and J. Oliver produced the original carte de visite photos of Peter showing his back. There are three variations of the "scourged back" picture, showing minor adjustments, which indicates that the photographers or their patrons were aware of the impact of the image and "revised" the pose to improve it. Negatives for the first two images may have been exposed on the same day, while the third photo was taken at a later time. The original images of Peter and Gordon, and at least two other known photos of contrabands photographed by McPherson & Oliver, were taken in a "makeshift studio with a hanging sheet for a backdrop and bare ground".

Samuel Knapp Towle, Surgeon, 30th Regiment of Massachusetts Volunteers, wrote in a letter about meeting Gordon. He had expected him to be vicious due to the whip scars on his back. Instead, he said "he seems INTELLIGENT and WELL-BEHAVED" [Towle's emphasis]. Other physicians, like J. W. Mercer, Asst. Surgeon 47th Massachusetts Volunteers as well as a surgeon of the First Louisiana regiment (colored), said in 1863 that they had seen many backs like this, and that when people talked of humane treatment of blacks, the photo of Gordon's back told the true story.

== Gordon ==
=== "Gordon" (Harper's Weekly) ===
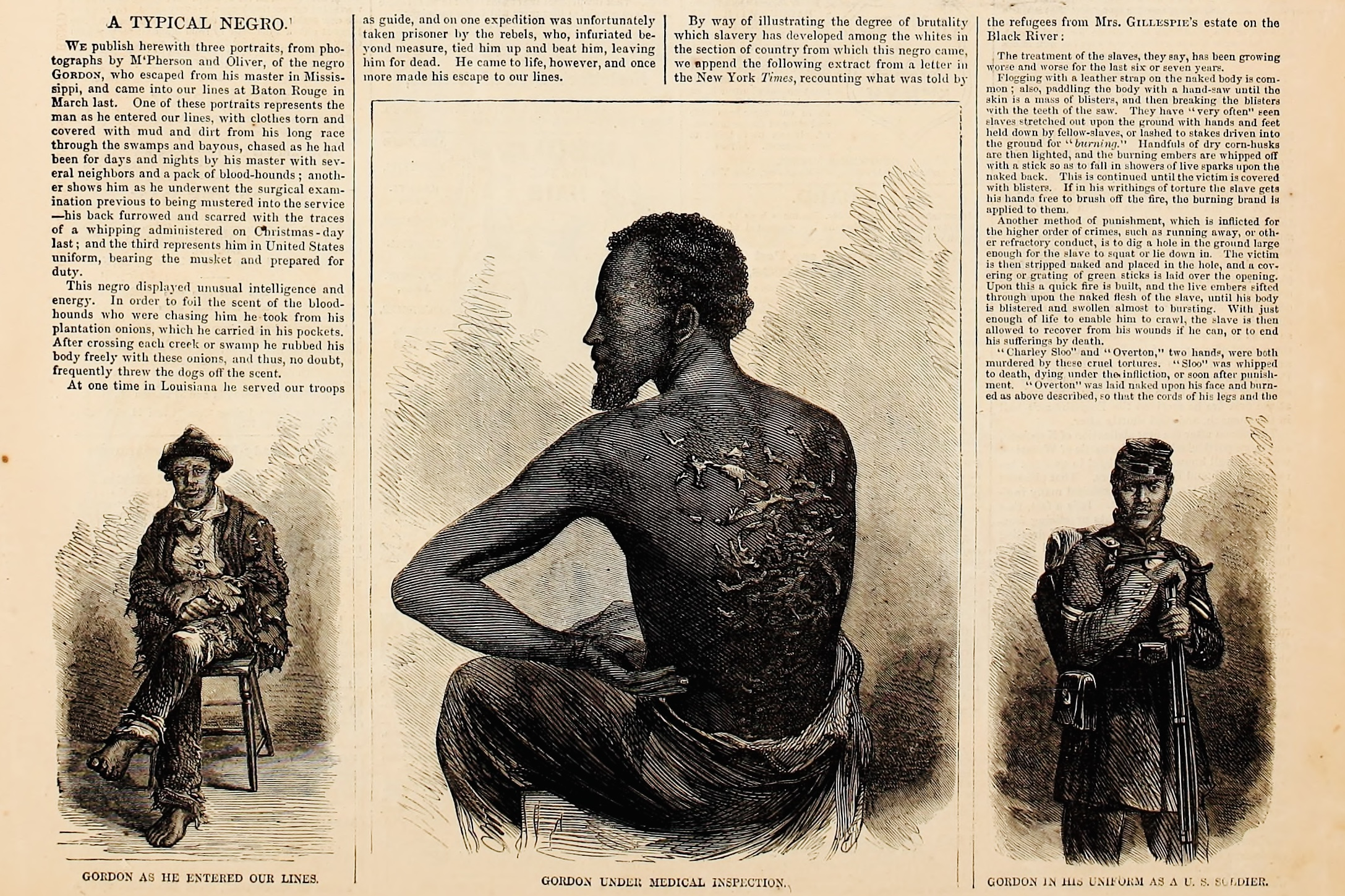
Harper's Weekly created the "A Typical Negro" triptych ("Gordon as he entered our lines" – "Gordon under medical inspection" – "Gordon in his uniform as a U.S. soldier") from what are now believed to be images of three different people.

On July 4, 1863, the day after the crucial Union victory at the Battle of Gettysburg, which was also the anniversary of the US Declaration of Independence, the most widely read magazine in the United States during the Civil War, Harper's Weekly, published an article called "A Typical Negro", which featured three illustrations of a man the magazine called Gordon. The unbylined article was composed of three parts: three wood-cut engravings, a three-paragraph biography of "Gordon", and a nine-paragraph excerpt from a front-page New York Times article published on June 14, 1863. Harper's Weekly created the "A Typical Negro" triptych ("Gordon as he entered our lines" – "Gordon under medical inspection" – "Gordon in his uniform as a U.S. soldier") out of what are now believed to be images of three separate individuals. In the Harper's telling, Gordon reportedly masked his scent from the bloodhounds that were chasing him, by carrying onions from his plantation in his pockets. After crossing each creek or swamp, he rubbed his body with the onion to throw the dogs off his scent, ultimately reaching refuge with the Union soldiers of the XIX Corps who were stationed in Baton Rouge.

The excerpted section of the New York Times article included information drawn from interviews with two pairs of married contrabands who had boarded the USS Lafayette (1848) near the mouth of the Red River in Louisiana. The refugees, interviewed by a New York Times war correspondent, described horrific torture on a plantation in Catahoula Parish, Louisiana, including various means of burning, and a form of whipping that used a hand saw instead of a livestock whip, wooden switch, or grain flail. The larger part of the July 4 issue of Harper's Weekly was devoted to Theodore R. Davis' sketches of the ongoing Siege of Vicksburg.

=== Gordon (historical) ===
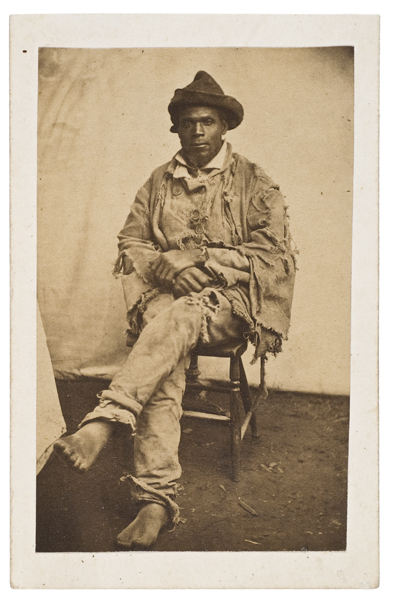
Gordon in 1863, just after he reached Baton Rouge; copy sold at auction in 2008 was annotated on verso "Contraband that marched 40 mi (64 km) to get to our lines" (McPherson & Oliver carte de visite)

According to the "Bostonian" letter, Gordon and Peter are two different people from a group of four that had traveled together for at least part of the journey to Union lines, all of whom had previously been the legal property of either Capt. Lyons of the Atchafalaya Basin, or Louis Fabyan of Clinton, Louisiana.

Unlike with the photo of the scourged back, of which there are scores of copies and various reprintings in dozens of libraries and institutions across the U.S., there is only one known copy of the photograph on the left-most image in the Harper's triptych is based. The photo, which surfaced in 2008 and was sold at Cowan Auctions for US$1,527.50 (equivalent to $2,284 in 2025), was printed by McPherson & Oliver, Baton Rouge, the same photographers who are credited with making the photo of Peter. The carte de visite sold by Cowan had a note in ink on the back that read, "Contraband that marched 40 miles to get to our lines". The image of Gordon has been described as "confident and strong", and therefore somewhat at odds with the written narrative provided by Harper's: "in spite of his poor dress, and contrary to almost every other photograph in the genre, Gordon displays a sense of self-possession and self-awareness that is difficult to ignore. Directly facing the camera, [he adopts] a dignified seated pose popular in middle-class studio portraiture." Gordon's "poor dress" was likely because "Many slaves, especially the agricultural workers who made up most of the enslaved population, only owned one or two suits of clothing at any one time, so they did not arrive at the Union encampments with great satchels full of luggage but, rather, 'almost wholly destitute of clothing'." It was common for former slaves to arrive at contraband refugee camps wearing Negro-cloth garments that were already in "tatters"; finding adequate replacements was one of the responsibilities of quartermasters and camp administrators.

According to the Bostonian, he brought the photos of both Peter and Gordon from Louisiana to New York in June 1863; he describes Gordon as the "sable youth clad in variegated and torn garments" and recounts that Gordon, Peter, John (who was killed en route), and a fourth unnamed man traveled together, moving only at night, rubbed "onions and strong-scented weeds" on themselves after fording watercourses, "twice swimming the turbid waters of the Amite River in their wanderings."

== McPherson & Oliver ==
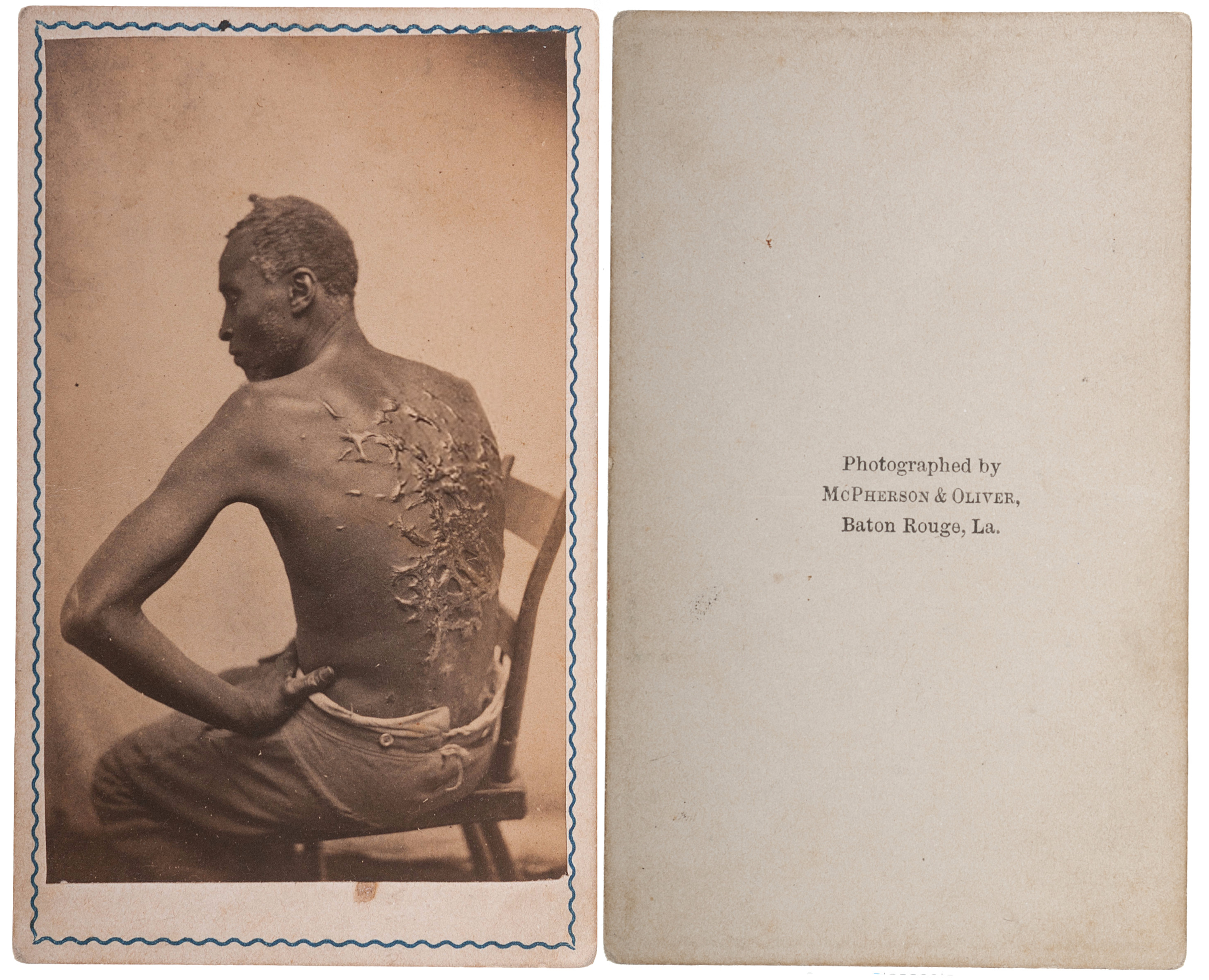
CDV The Scourged Back of "Gordon" an escaped slave from Louisiana - McPherson & Oliver, 1863

William D. McPherson (January 15, 1825 – October 9, 1867) and J. Oliver (?–?) were Southern photographers active in New Orleans and Baton Rouge, Louisiana, in the 1860s. McPherson & Oliver's business was exclusively Confederate, until Union forces occupied Baton Rouge in May 1862. Like other Southern photographers in occupied cities, the pair quickly adapted to the occupation. This arrangement had the benefit of being able to procure photography supplies through special arrangements with the military. McPherson & Oliver are probably best known for "The Scourged Back", their sensational, widely published portrait of "Gordon", an escaped slave from a Louisiana plantation, who came into the Union lines at Baton Rouge. The pair went to Port Hudson, La. in the summer of 1863 and photographed the hard-fought siege of that city. After the fall of Port Hudson on July 8, McPherson & Oliver photographed the captured, Confederate fortifications. In August 1864, following the capture of Fort Morgan on Mobile Bay, Alabama, McPherson & Oliver made a comprehensive photographic record of that installation. In 1864 they moved to New Orleans and operated a gallery at 133 Canal Street. On April 26, 1865, "J. Oliver, 132 Canal, photographer" appeared as number 3490 a second district of New Orleans military draft list. In 1865 they dissolved their partnership. McPherson carried on with his own gallery at 132 Canal St. until his death from yellow fever in 1867. Samuel T. Blessing, who survived the epidemic, administered McPherson's estate.

McPherson & Oliver, Baton Rouge
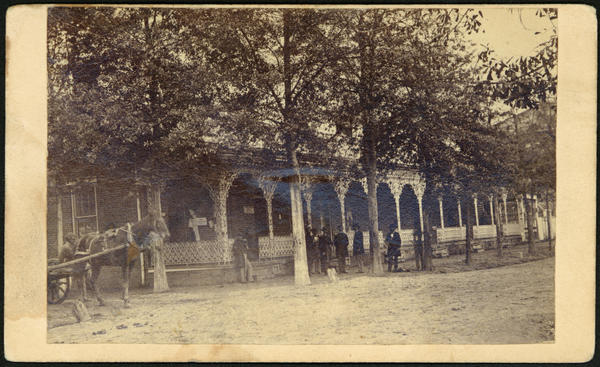
According to the "Bostonian", Peter's testimony was taken at the Provost-Marshal's office in Baton Rouge, pictured here in an 1863 photograph ascribed to McPherson & Oliver (LSU Libraries item 13940008)

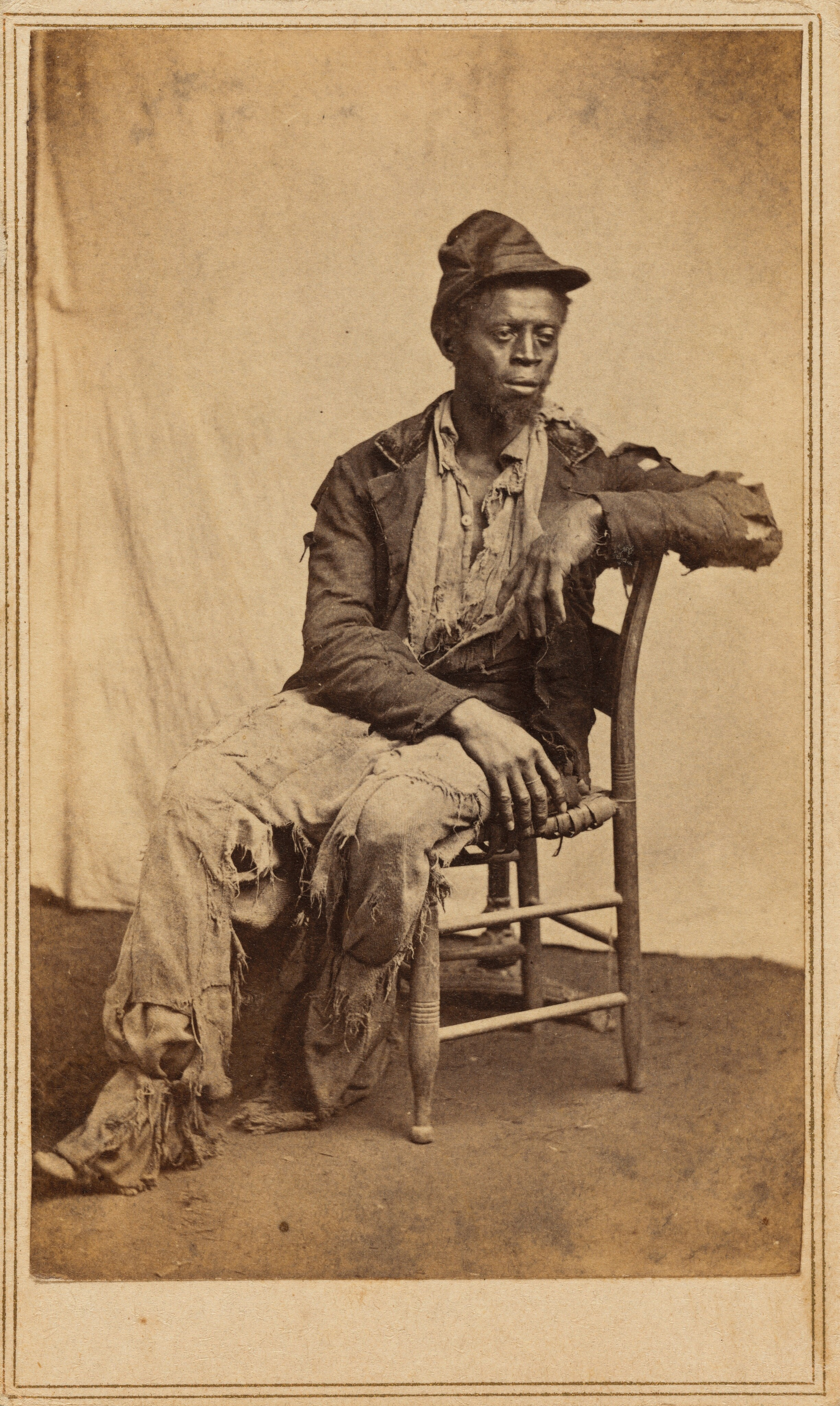
McPherson & Oliver, Baton Rouge photograph with note in pencil on verso: "Regular contraband" (National Gallery of Art 2018.95.30)

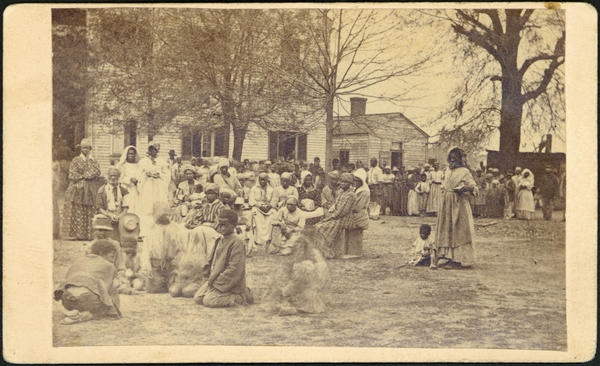
Contraband camp in Baton Rouge in "buildings formerly used as a Female Seminary"; this image, taken c. 1863, is ascribed to McPherson & Oliver (LSU Libraries item 13940009r)

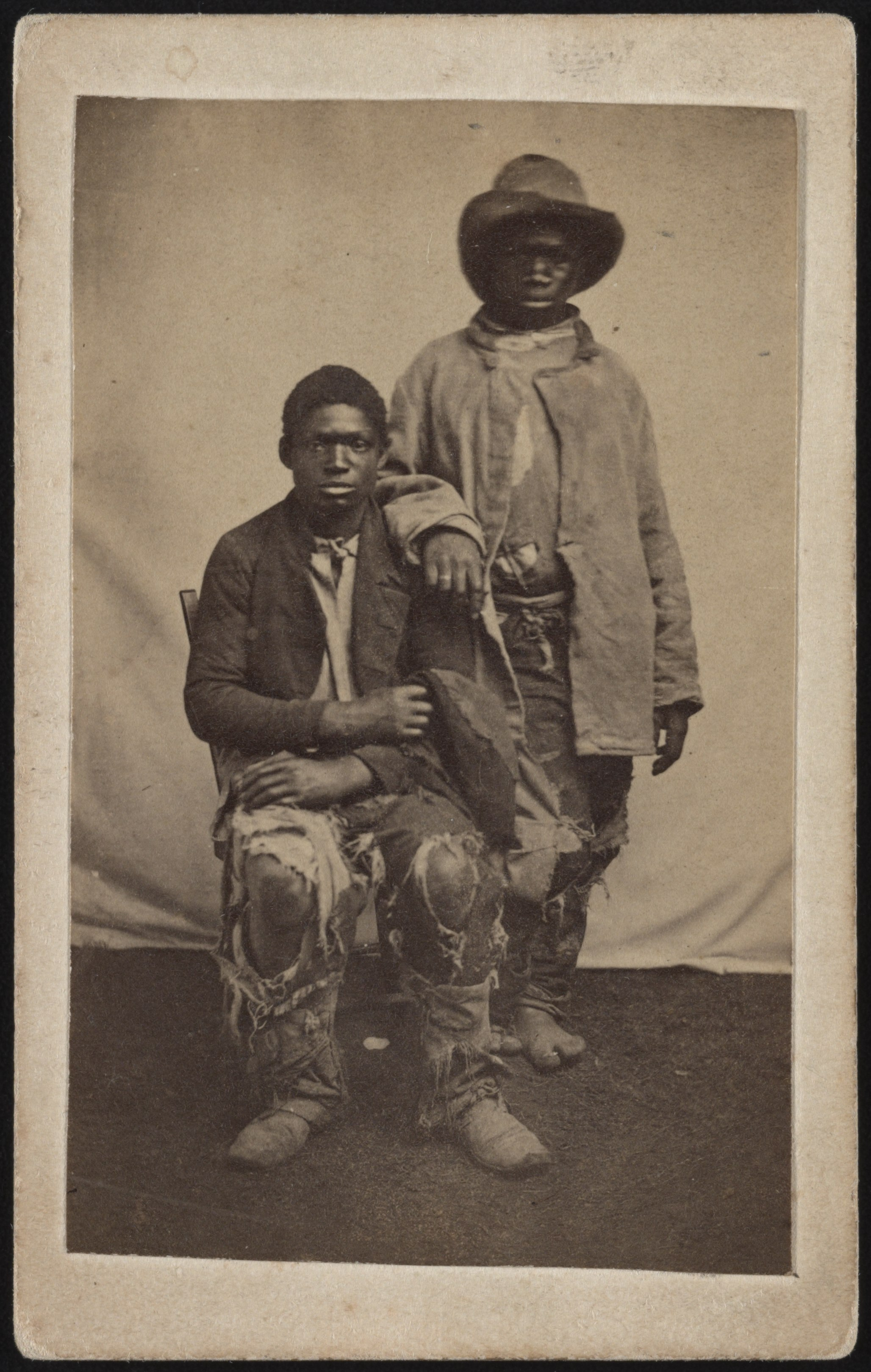
One print of this McPherson & Oliver image has a handwritten note: "Contrabands just arrived. 'True to the life.' J.Y.W." (this copy, Liljenquist collection, LCCN 2017659658); another known copy has the annotation, "Our scouts and guides in 1863 at Baton Rouge" (Met 2019.523)

== Union Army service ==
According to one study of images of African-Americans during the American Civil War,

[The] photographically mediated before and after narrative quickly became a popular means by which White Northern cultural producers framed the social, cultural, and political meanings of emancipation. Formally, the genre consists of two or more photographs or photographically inspired drawings that were more often than not annotated with typed or hand-written captions. In this way, the written word borrowed from the evidentiary authority of the photograph so as to produce a new kind of slave narrative, one capable not only of telling slavery's story to the eye, but also capable of doing so without the aid of the speaking Black narrator. In other words, the before and after narrative, comprised of White writers' written 'philosoph[ies]' and the visual 'facts' of injured Black bodies, effaced the narrative authority of formerly enslaved African-American narrators, and supplanted the former slave's written and spoken testimony with a picture.

The third illustration in the Harper's Weekly article was captioned "Gordon in his uniform as a U.S. soldier". There are no known copies of a photograph on which the illustration might have been based. The Bostonian letter to the New-York Tribune profers extensive backstories on the first two images in the triptych but pointedly ignores the etching of the enlisted man. Illustrator Vincent Colyer later recycled an identical image in the book Report of the Services Rendered by the Freed People to the United States Army, in North Carolina with the caption "Sergeant Furney Bryant, 1st North Carolina Colored Troops". According to Harper's Weekly, Gordon joined the Union Army as a guide three months after the Emancipation Proclamation allowed for the enrollment of freed slaves into the military forces. On one expedition, he was taken prisoner by the Confederates; they tied him up, beat him, and left him for dead. He survived and once more escaped to Union lines.

In July 1863, the country's most important abolitionist periodical, William Lloyd Garrison's The Liberator, reported that Gordon had fought bravely as a sergeant in the Second Louisiana Native Guard during the Siege of Port Hudson in May 1863. The siege was the first time that African-American soldiers played a leading role in an assault during the American Civil War. However, the 2nd Louisiana Native Guard Infantry Regiment did not participate in the battle at Port Hudson. Also, the Louisiana Native Guard units that did fight so gallantly at Port Hudson (the 1st Louisiana Native Guard (Union) and 3rd Louisiana Native Guard Infantry regiments) were recruited and mustered in 1862, well before Peter or Gordon were said to have arrived in Baton Rouge in April 1863. There were five regiments known as the Corps D'Afrique Engineers, recruited by Gen. Daniel Ullman, that participated in the Port Hudson campaign, primarily digging trenches and contributing to the force strength of the 20,000 Union troops facing the 12,000 Confederates. The Corps D'Afrique Engineers is also credited with building Bailey's Dam, which saved the Union navy's Mississippi River Squadron. On May 20, 1863, the Detroit Free Press reported, "Colonel Sharps, from General Banks' department, states that General Ulmann's brigade is more than filled, and the new country just opened by Banks' campaign, will furnish two or three divisions of negroes, in response to Banks' call for a Corps D'Afrique. No doubt the rebels are engaged in raising negro regiments, as it is only from such material they now, in extreme Southern States, recruit their ranks. Negroes are not backward in adopting a uniform, which is now their death warrant if taken by the rebels."

== Timeline ==
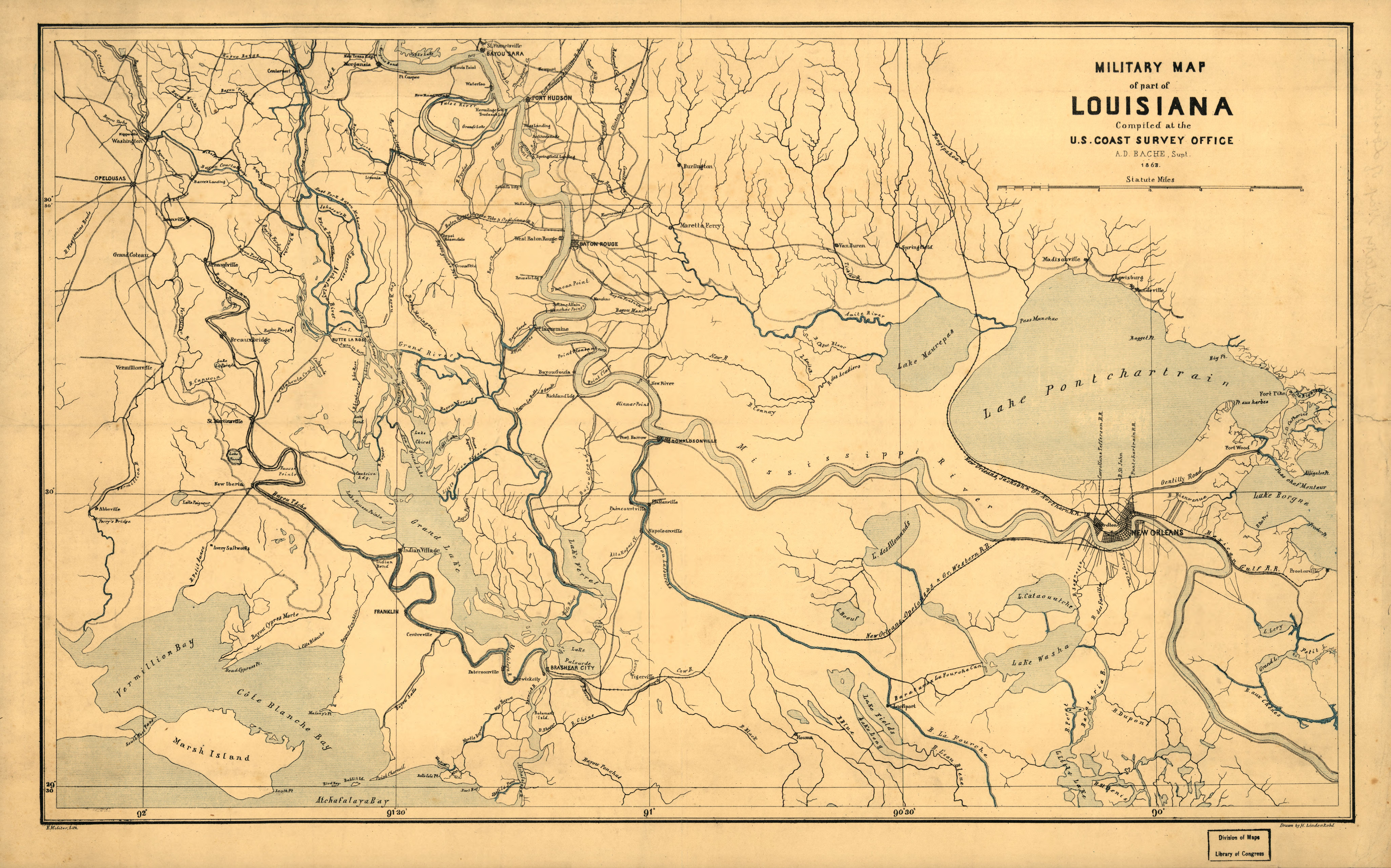
Military map of a part of Louisiana compiled at the U.S. Coast Survey Office, 1863; Peter lived in approximately the upper left corner of the map, near Bayou Beouf and Bayou Cocodrie; the raiders that killed Lyons reportedly rode from Morganzia; Port Hudson is almost directly east of the vicinity of the Lyons plantation; the Amite River (which drains from Lake Maurepas) and Baton Rouge both lie on the east side of the Mississippi River

- Late October 1862 – Peter whipped by overseer "Artayon Carrier"
- Christmas 1862 – Begins to "recover senses", told that he had attempted to "shoot everybody"
- January 1, 1863 – Emancipation Proclamation in effect in St. Landry Parish
- January 29, 1863 – General Order 12: Promulgation of the Emancipation Proclamation
- March 24, 1863 – Peter departs for Baton Rouge
- April 2, 1863 – Peter makes statement at Provost-Marshal's office in Baton Rouge
- April or May 1863 – Peter photographed by McPherson & Oliver
- May 18, 1863 – Siege of Vicksburg begins
- May 22, 1863 – Siege of Port Hudson begins
- June 1863 – "Bostonian" takes copies of McPherson & Oliver's cartes de visite of Peter and Gordon to New York
- July 4, 1863 – Etchings of Peter, Gordon and a third individual appear as illustrations of "A Typical Negro" article in Harper's Weekly
- September 23, 1864 – Peter's former owner John Lyons is killed at his plantation by pro-Union raiders

== Influence ==
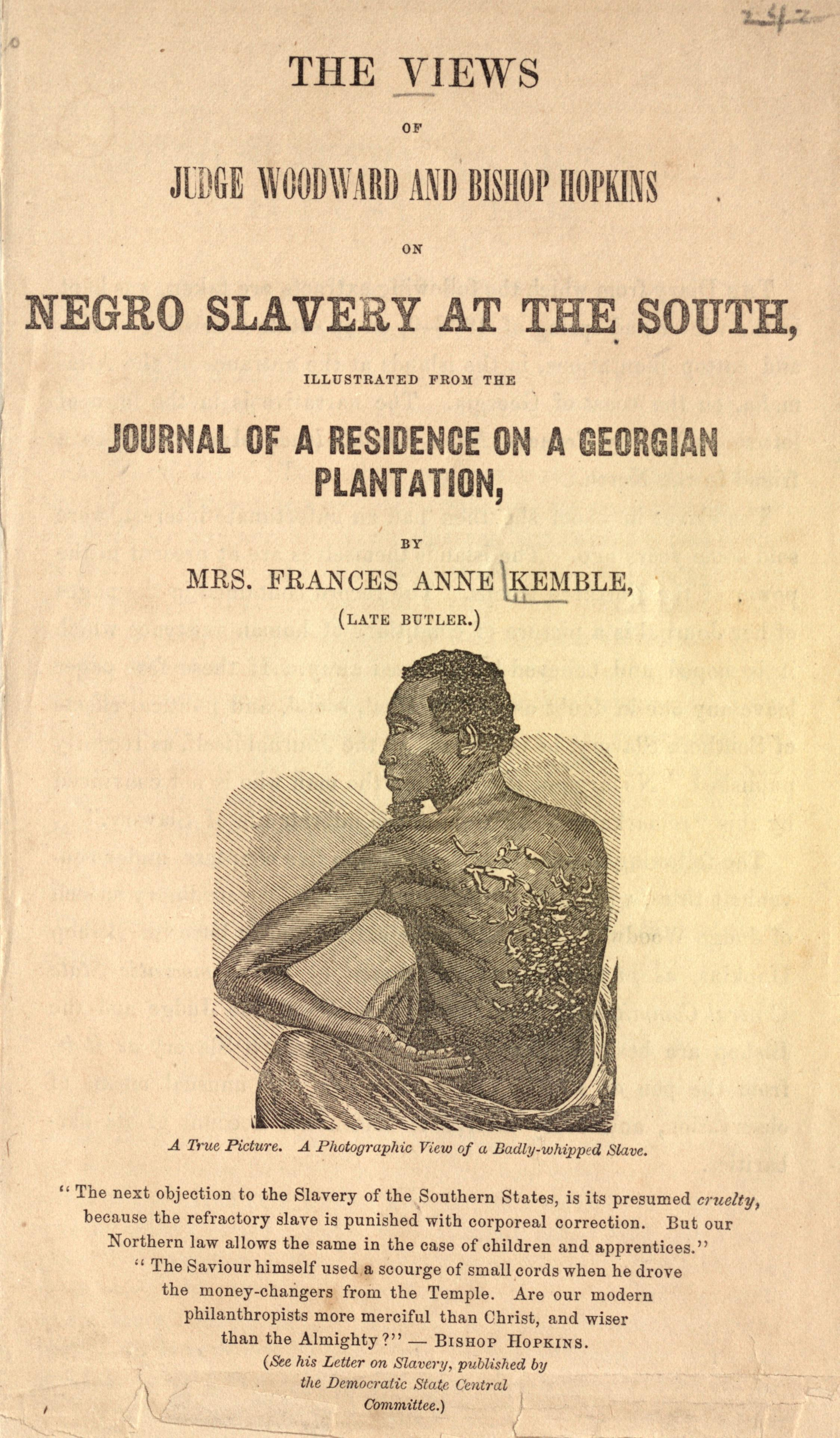
The third version of the Scourged Back was used as a title-page illustration for this edition of Fanny Anne Kemble's 1863 memoir of living on a Sea Islands cotton plantation in 1838.

Theodore Tilton, editor of The Independent in New York stated in 1863:

Five or six months after the scourging ... the frightful laceration was partially healed, and only scars remained. But what must the whipping have been to leave such scars! The back looks like a plate of iron, eaten by acids and corroded by rust; or like a walnut-table honey-combed by worms ... Bits as big as the hand seem to have been cut out of the flesh. No wonder that, at this distance of time, the man looks thin and ghastly, though he was a strong man, and must be a man of fine physique and presence.
This card-photograph should be multiplied by the hundred thousand, and scattered over the states. It tells the story in a way that even Mrs. Stowe cannot approach; because it tells the story to the eye. If seeing is believing—and it is in the immense majority of cases—seeing this card would be equivalent to believing things of the slave states which Northern men and women would move heaven and earth to abolish.

The image was indeed duplicated and widely distributed; copies were printed by Mathew Brady, McAllister & Brother of Philadelphia, and Chandler Seaver Jr. of Boston.

In 2015, Frank Goodyear, a former curator of photographs at the Smithsonian National Portrait Gallery said, "Photography mediates our understanding of the world ... many Americans had never seen what a beating literally looked like." The Atlantic's editor-in-chief James Bennet in 2011 noted, "Part of the incredible power of this image I think is the dignity of that man. He's posing. His expression is almost indifferent. I just find that remarkable. He's basically saying, 'This is a fact.'"

On September 15, 2025, The Washington Post reported that the Trump administration has ordered the removal of the "scourged back" photo from Fort Pulaski National Monument along with other signs and exhibits related to slavery at multiple national park sites.

== In popular culture ==
- In the 2012 film Lincoln, Abraham Lincoln's son Tad views a glass plate of Gordon's medical examination photo by candlelight.
- American artist Arthur Jafa recreated the iconic image of Gordon as a sculpture titled Ex-Slave Gordon (2017). The work is made of vacuum-formed plastic and depicts Gordon's back from the waist up.
- Emancipation, a 2022 film based on Peter and Gordon's escape, starring Will Smith and directed by Antoine Fuqua, went into production in 2021, and was made available for streaming on December 9, 2022 on Apple TV+.

== See also ==
- List of slaves
- Slavery in Louisiana
- End of slavery in the United States
- List of photographs considered the most important
- Photographers of the American Civil War
- Torture of slaves in the United States
