= AEE =

AEE may refer to:

== Education ==
- Acadiana Educational Endowment, an educational organization in Louisiana
- Alliance for Excellent Education, an American educational organization
- Association for Experiential Education, an American educational organization

== Energy companies ==
- Ameren Corporation, an electric utility company that trades under AEE on the NYSE
- Atomenergoexport, a predecessor of Atomstroyexport, the Russian Federation's nuclear power equipment and service export monopoly
- Puerto Rico Electric Power Authority (Spanish: Autoridad de Energía Eléctrica), Puerto Rico's public electric power company

== Other uses ==
- Northeast Pashayi language (ISO 639-3 code "aee")
- Adareil Airport in Upper Nile State, South Sudan (IATA airport code AEE)
- Aegean Airlines, a Greek airline (ICAO designator AEE)
- All England Eleven, a non-international England cricket team
- Assessment of Environmental Effects, part of a resource consent under the Resource Management Act 1991, New Zealand
- Association of Energy Engineers, an American energy engineering society
- AVN Adult Entertainment Expo, an annual trade show held in Las Vegas, Nevada
