= Emancipation (2022 film) =

2022 film by Antoine Fuqua

- Official release poster
- Directed by: Antoine Fuqua
- Written by: William N. Collage
- Produced by: Todd Black; Joey McFarland; Jon Mone; Will Smith
- Starring: Will Smith; Ben Foster; Charmaine Bingwa
- Cinematography: Robert Richardson
- Edited by: Conrad Buff IV
- Music by: Marcelo Zarvos
- Production companies: Apple Studios; Westbrook Studios; McFarland Entertainment; Escape Artists
- Distributed by: Apple TV+
- Release dates: December 2, 2022 (US); December 9, 2022 (Apple TV+)
- Running time: 132 minutes
- Country: United States
- Language: English
- Budget: $120–162 million

Emancipation is a 2022 American historical action thriller film directed by Antoine Fuqua, written by William N. Collage, and co-produced by Will Smith. Smith stars as a runaway slave headed for Baton Rouge, Louisiana, in the 1860s, after President Abraham Lincoln issued the Emancipation Proclamation to end slavery in secessionist Confederate states, surviving the swamps while being pursued by slave catchers and their dogs. The film co-stars Ben Foster as a ruthless slave hunter and Charmaine Bingwa as an enslaved wife and mother.

The film is loosely based on the life of a self-emancipated slave, known as either Gordon or "Whipped Peter". That story was made famous by the photograph of a man's bare back heavily scourged from an overseer's whippings, which was published worldwide as a magazine illustration in 1863 and gave the abolitionist movement proof of the cruelty of slavery. Producer Joey McFarland began researching that story in 2018 and hired Collage to write the script.

The film was officially announced in June 2020, with Fuqua to direct and Smith to star. Filming was in Louisiana between July and August 2021, with Apple paying US$130 million to acquire the rights to the film, outbidding several other studios.

It was screened in Washington, D.C., on October 1, 2022, and released in select theaters on December 2, 2022, then streamed on December 9 on Apple TV+. The film received mixed reviews from critics, who praised Smith's performance but criticized the screenplay and its handling of real-life events.

== Plot ==
At a Louisiana cotton plantation in 1863, a slave named "Peter" is praying with his family when his owner, John Lyons, and a group of white men drag him out of his home at gunpoint. As the wagon carrying him pulls away, Peter cries out to his wife Dodienne and his children that they must stay together until he can find his way back to them. Reaching a Confederate encampment in Clinton, Louisiana, he is put to work alongside other conscripted slaves.

The slaves are poorly fed and clothed despite the grueling labor and endure cruel treatment at the hands of their white guards. They are whipped, set upon by dogs, branded, and dragged by horses if they try to run away, or shot if they stop working because of exhaustion. Peter tells the disheartened slaves to just believe in God and pray.

One day, Peter snaps and attacks one of the guards, triggering an uprising. He and several other slaves escape into the nearby swamps, pursued by the slave catcher Fassel and his men. One slave is unable to swim across a river due to fear of alligators and is caught. After revealing the other slaves' plans, Fassel shoots him and leaves his body for the gators. The three remaining men split up and go their separate ways.

With no supplies or even a clear idea of where to go, Peter nevertheless manages to evade his pursuers time and time again. Just as he is about to reach the safety of Union-held Baton Rouge, Fassel ambushes him and offers to spare his life if he returns to slavery. Peter refuses, but before Fassel kills him, he is fatally shot in the throat by a black member of the 1st Louisiana Native Guard.

Peter is taken to a Union field hospital to recover. A photograph of his back is then taken and distributed throughout the United States to help rally public support for the end of slavery. Peter enlists in the Native Guard; while under fire from Confederate troops, he demonstrates great bravery and is quickly promoted. He spends the rest of the war helping to liberate Confederate plantations, while also reuniting with Dodienne and their children.

In the epilogue, the text states that thanks to the momentum from Lincoln's Emancipation Proclamation, over four million slaves were freed by Union forces by the war's end in 1865.

== Cast ==
- Will Smith as Peter
- Ben Foster as Fassel, slave hunter
- Charmaine Bingwa as Dodienne, Peter's wife
- Jayson Warner Smith as John Lyons, cotton plantation owner
- Austin Alexander as Trapp, a white plantation worker whom Peter bites
- Britton Webb as Bijoux, a white plantation worker helping Trapp
- Jesse C. Boyd as Mike Hurley, a white plantation worker who puts a gun to Dodienne's head
- Steven Ogg as Ordnance Sergeant Howard, a Confederate soldier guarding slaves at the railroad camp
- Grant Harvey as Leeds, a Confederate soldier guarding slaves at the railroad camp
- Gilbert Owuor as Gordon, Peter's slave friend who escapes the railroad camp and makes it separately to the Union Army in Baton Rouge
- Michael Luwoye as John, the branded slave, skeptical of Peter, who escapes the railroad camp but doesn't make it to freedom
- Jabbar Lewis as Tomas, Peter's slave friend who escapes the railroad camp but gets shot by Fassel in a river
- Ronnie Gene Blevins as Harrington, Fassel's white slave-hunting assistant
- Aaron Moten as Knowls, the former slave who works with Fassel and Harrington capturing runaway slaves, whom Peter calls "the worst kind."
- Imani Pullum as Betsy, Peter's older daughter
- Jeremiah Friedlander as Scipion, Peter's son
- Jordyn McIntosh as Laurette, Peter's young daughter
- Landon Chase Dubois as Little Peter
- Mustafa Shakir as Captain André Cailloux, First Louisiana Native Guard of the Union Army
- Paul Ben-Victor as Major G. Halstead, who inducts Peter into the Union Army
- David Denman as General William Dwight

== Production ==
=== Development and casting ===
On June 15, 2020, it was reported that Antoine Fuqua would direct Will Smith in Emancipation, based on a spec script written by William N. Collage. Producer Joey McFarland, who had started researching and developing the film in 2018, recruited Collage to write the script. Fuqua said:

It's almost two years now from when I first read the script. It hit my heart and my soul in so many ways that are impossible to convey but I think you understand. We're watching some of the feeling that I had, in the streets right now. There's sadness, there's anger, there's love, faith and hope ... That's important to see, and the most hopeful thing that I'm seeing, that they're not going to stand for it anymore.

Warner Bros., MGM, Lionsgate, and Universal Pictures bid on the film before Apple ultimately won distribution rights for over $130 million. In August 2021, Ben Foster, Charmaine Bingwa, Gilbert Owuor, and Mustafa Shakir joined the cast. Smith was paid $35 million for his involvement.

=== Filming ===
Principal photography was expected to begin on May 3, 2021, in Los Angeles. It was later set to begin on June 21, 2021, in Georgia, but on April 12, it was announced that the film would be shot elsewhere due to the recently enacted Election Integrity Act of 2021. Smith and Fuqua said in a joint statement: "We cannot in good conscience provide economic support to a government that enacts regressive voting laws that are designed to restrict voter access." The location move was reported to have cost approximately $15 million. Filming was announced to take place in New Orleans from July 12 to August 21, 2021. On August 2, filming paused for five days due to several positive COVID-19 tests. Additional casting for the film was announced in November and December.

=== Music ===
The film score is by Marcelo Zarvos, who described the music as "spiritual and untraditional" per Fuqua's suggestions. He employed a 70-piece orchestra, a 40-member choir, and soloists from around the world, for traditional American and African sounds. The soundtrack was released by Lakeshore Records on December 9, 2022.

== Release ==
A screening of Emancipation was held at the Congressional Black Caucus Foundation's 51st Annual Legislative Conference in Washington, D.C., on October 1, 2022, with Smith and Fuqua in attendance to give a subsequent Q&A discussion. It was screened in Los Angeles, on October 24, 2022. The film premiered in theaters on December 2, 2022, and was streamed on Apple TV+ on December 9.

While Smith had been attached to the film in 2020, and principal photography had moved forward in the summer of 2021, the controversy over Smith slapping Chris Rock at the March 2022 94th Academy Awards was cited in May 2022, when the film's release was delayed to a tentative 2023 date; production delays and an overcrowded film release schedule from Apple were also cited in the May announcement. It was subsequently moved to its final date.

== Reception ==
=== Critical response ===
On the review aggregator website Rotten Tomatoes, 45% of 155 critics' reviews are positive, with an average rating of 5.6/10. The website's consensus reads: "Emancipation works as an action movie – albeit one that's uncomfortably at odds with its awkward handling of the real-life events that inspired its stirring story." Metacritic, which uses a weighted average, assigned the film a score of 53 out of 100, based on 41 critics, indicating "mixed or average" reviews.

Emancipation was compared to other media depicting slavery made in the previous decade, such as 12 Years a Slave, Harriet, The Good Lord Bird, and Antebellum, with Jackson Weaver of CBC arguing that all were formulaic and exploitative. The cinematography and action sequences were frequently praised, however some critics argued said scenes were at contrast with the film's emotional appeal and attempts at realism.

The slapping incident was referenced in some reviews; in a positive first-day review from Screen International's Tim Grierson, before the collective mixed reviews had been published, he hoped that enough positive reviews might overcome the possibility that the "scandal may temper audiences' enthusiasm" to see the film.

=== Accolades ===
Accolades received by Black Panther: Wakanda Forever
Award	Date of ceremony	Category	Recipient(s)	Result	Ref.
Black Reel Awards	February 6, 2023	Outstanding Breakthrough Performance, Female	Charmaine Bingwa	Nominated	
Black Reel Awards	February 6, 2023	Outstanding Cinematography	Robert Richardson	Nominated	
Hollywood Music in Media Awards	November 16, 2022	Original Score in a Feature Film	Marcelo Zarvos	Nominated	
NAACP Image Awards	February 25, 2023	Outstanding Motion Picture	Emancipation	Nominated	
NAACP Image Awards	February 25, 2023	Outstanding Directing in a Motion Picture	Antoine Fuqua	Nominated	
NAACP Image Awards	February 25, 2023	Outstanding Costume Design	Francine Jamison-Tanchuck	Nominated	
NAACP Image Awards	February 25, 2023	Outstanding Actor in a Motion Picture	Will Smith	Won	
NAACP Image Awards	February 25, 2023	Outstanding Ensemble Cast in a Motion Picture	The cast of Emancipation	Nominated	
Women Film Critics Circle	December 19, 2022	Invisible Woman Award	Charmaine Bingwa	Won	

== See also ==
- List of films featuring slavery
