= Acadiana Conservation Corridor =

Wildlife corridor in Louisiana

Acadiana Conservation Corridor is a 2,285 acres (925 ha) wildlife corridor owned and managed as a wildlife management area by the Louisiana Department of Wildlife and Fisheries (LDWF).

== Location ==
The corridor covers parts of St. Landry, Evangeline, Avoyelles, and Rapides Parishes. The southern boundary starts north of La-182 (exit 27), northwest of Beggs where Bayou Courtableau swings north to follow I-49 as the western boundary. The northern boundary is north of La-181 (Exit 56), south of US 167 (Exit 61) with bayou boeuf-cocodrie diversion channel as the western boundary.

== Protected area ==
All land managed by the Louisiana Department of Wildlife and Fisheries, including habitat protection, habitat restoration projects, endangered species protection, research and monitoring, pesticide use, and ensuring sustainable populations through hunting and fishing regulations, is a protected area in the state.

=== Naming ===
Wildlife conservation corridors can be called or referred to as Habitat Corridors, Ecological Corridors, Wildlife Corridors, Greenways, Connectivity Zones, Migration Corridors, Conservation Pathways, Landscape Linkages, Biodiversity Corridors, or Nature Highways.

== Importance ==
Animals need these corridors to move and to complete their life cycles. In some cases, this can be hundreds of miles. A mule deer was tracked 242 miles from the deserts of Wyoming to the forests of Idaho. Corridors can take many forms to include water drawdown and reflooding of wetlands, wildlife tunnels, wildlife fences and barracades, removing some of the 6 million man-made fish barriers and wildlife overpasses. Laguna Atascosa National Wildlife Refuge in Texas has installed 14-16 underpasses primarily to benefit the country's last two remaining ocelot populations, but cameras have caught other animals using the corridors.

California (Wildlife Corridirs: AB 1889, the Room to Roam Act and Safe Roads and Wildlife Protection Act of 2022), Colorado, Florida, Nevada, New Hampshire, New Mexico, Oregon, Utah, Vermont, Virginia, Washington, and Wyoming have enacted Wildlife Migration Corridors between 2019 and 2022. Conservation corridors can include placement of bridges, tunnels, culverts, fencing, and other infrastructure to allow safe passage from one area to the other to mitigate negatively impacted habitat fragmentation which can include federal, private, or state lands.

Legislation and conservation initiatives have created over 1,000 dedicated wildlife crossings in the US, which began over 50 years ago, to connect wildlife habitats. Federal funding is appropriated, sometimes on a matching funds basis, to support the creation of Conservation corridors to promote sustainable management practices as well as mitigate conflicts between humans and animals.

Interstate Wildlife Corridors have begun to be implemented across state lines. The Yellowstone to Yukon Conservation Initiative (Y2Y), covering 2,000 miles (3,200 km), six states, two Canadian provinces, and two Canadian territories, protects lands from Wyoming to Canada’s Yukon Territory and Path of the Pronghorn between Wyoming and Idaho.

A Conservation corridor was completed between Bayou Cocodrie National Wildlife Refuge, Tensas River National Wildlife Refuge, and Red River Wildlife Management Area for the 150 species of birds and other wildlife, including the Louisiana black bear.

=== Globally ===
From Banff National Park Wildlife Crossings, Terai Arc Landscape trans-border initiative, which created protected areas between Nepal and India, Ewaso Ng’iro Elephant Corridor, along with many others, have shown the importance of conservation Corridors.

== Flora and fauna ==
The WMA is classified as bottomland hardwood. The overstory includes bitter pecan, overcup oak, sugarberry, swamp maple, water elm, and honey locust. Considering the high water after heavy rains the understory includes the dwarf palmetto (Sabal minor) or Saw palmetto (Serenoa repens) deciduous holly, smilax, poison ivy, blackberry, dewberry, rattan, and peppervine.

== See also ==
- List of Louisiana Wildlife Management Areas
