= Adareil Airport =

- IATA: AEE; ICAO: none

Summary
- Location: Adareil, South Sudan
- Coordinates: 10°3′13″N 32°57′34″E

Map
- Location of the airport in South Sudan

Adareil Airport (IATA: AEE) is an airport in Adareil, South Sudan.
