= Corps D'Afrique Engineers =

Corps D'Afrique Engineers may refer to:

- 1st Corps d'Afrique Engineers, later reorganized as 95th United States Colored Infantry Regiment
- 2nd Corps d'Afrique Engineers, later reorganized as 96th United States Colored Infantry Regiment
- 3rd Corps d'Afrique Engineers, later reorganized as 97th United States Colored Infantry Regiment
- 4th Corps d'Afrique Engineers, later reorganized as 98th United States Colored Infantry Regiment
- 5th Corps d'Afrique Engineers, later reorganized as 99th United States Colored Infantry Regiment
