= Acadiana Educational Endowment =

Founded in 1989 in Lafayette, Louisiana, the Acadiana Educational Endowment or AEE is a 501(c)3 nonprofit organization supporting education. To date, the AEE has distributed over $580,000 to schools in Louisiana and has founded numerous other projects and initiatives. These projects include mini-grant programs for encouraging innovative teaching approaches, scholarships for teachers, hurricane relief for schools, and several websites.

In 2001, the AEE expanded its mandate nationwide and created The American Public School Endowments to handle this enlarged mission. In response to the 2005 Hurricane Katrina and Hurricane Rita disasters, APSE and the AEE began raising funds and collecting equipment and supplies to help rebuild schools in the ravaged areas.

In addition to donations and grants, the AEE has created several websites. The two most prominent are booksXYZ.com, a non-profit bookstore to generate financial support for education in the United States; and CajunFun.com to encourage students in South Central Louisiana to experience the rich cultural life of the region.
