= Bayou Cocodrie National Wildlife Refuge =

National Wildlife Refuge in Concordia Parish, Louisiana

- IUCN category IV (habitat/species management area)
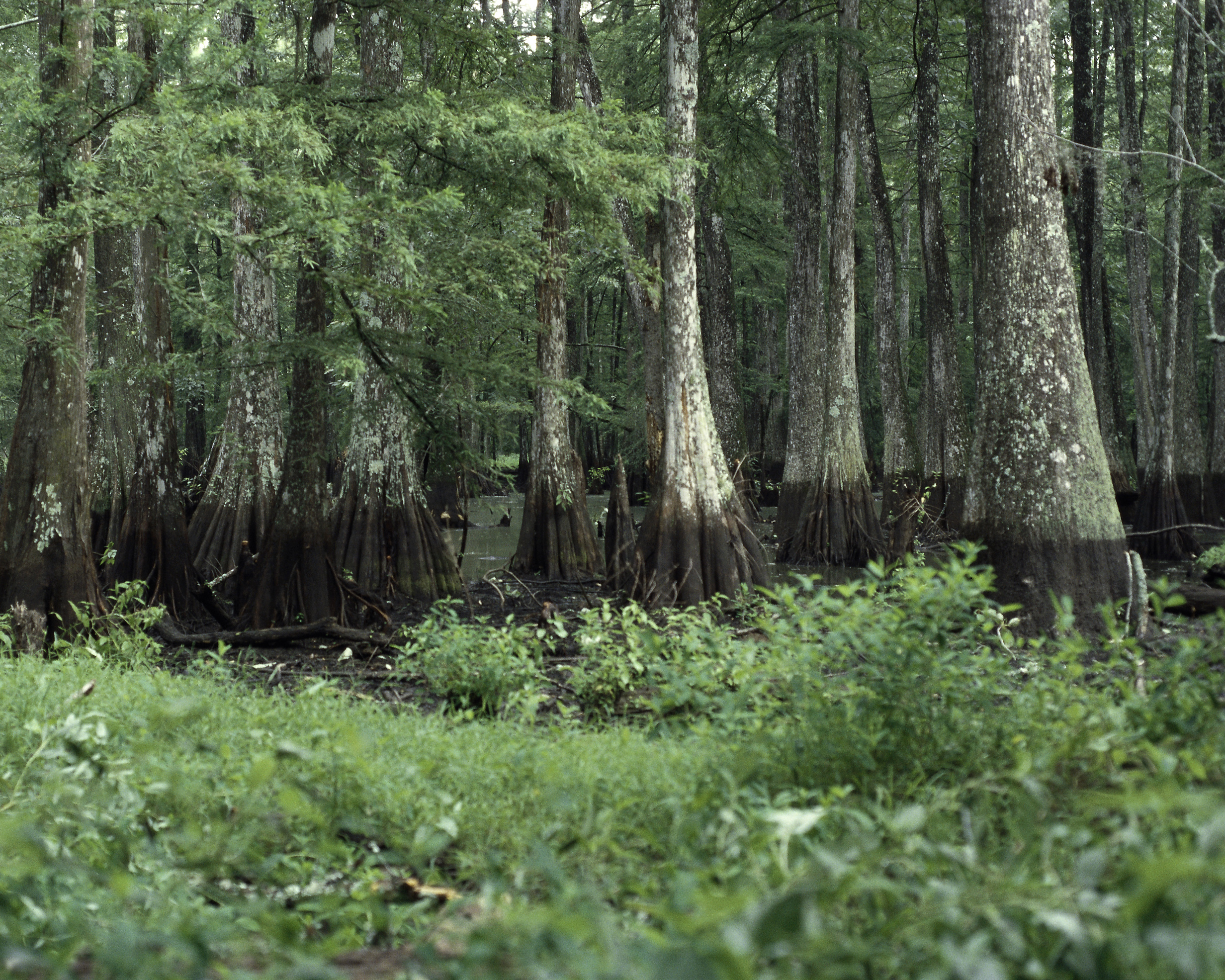
- Bald cypress stand at Bayou Cocodrie.
- Interactive map of Bayou Cocodrie National Wildlife Refuge
- Location: Concordia Parish, Louisiana
- Nearest city: Vidalia, Louisiana
- Coordinates: 31°33′00″N 91°38′00″W
- Area: 15,155 acres (61.33 km^{2})
- Established: 1992
- Governing body: U.S. Fish and Wildlife Service
- Website: Bayou Cocodrie National Wildlife Refuge

Bayou Cocodrie National Wildlife Refuge

Bayou Cocodrie National Wildlife Refuge was established in 1992 to protect some of the last remaining, least-disturbed bottomland hardwood forest tracts in the Lower Mississippi Valley. These wooded wetlands, oxbow lakes, brakes, sloughs, and bayous, are inhabited seasonally by over 150 species of migratory birds, including forest-breeding birds, water birds, and waterfowl. The 15,155-acre (61.33 km^{2}) refuge is located in Concordia Parish, Louisiana, 10 miles (16 km) southwest of Vidalia, Louisiana. It is named for the state-designated scenic river which runs through its center.

The Nature Conservancy purchased an 11,403-acre (46.15 km^{2}) core tract in 1991 from the Fisher Lumber Company, a subsidiary of General Motors Corporation. The Conservancy then sold the land to the US Fish and Wildlife Service over a span of five years. Hoover Slough unit was later added to the refuge.

The bottomland hardwoods at Bayou Cocodrie have been noted as some of the last remaining, least disturbed timber of what historically was once a vast hardwood forest along the Mississippi River from Illinois to Louisiana. The refuge is part of a forested wildlife corridor used by Louisiana black bear

== Flora and fauna ==
The majority of the refuge is hardwood forest of oak, gum, and ash. A 1,000-acre (4.0 km^{2}) site of hardwood is designated a natural resource area for study purposes. The remaining habitat is wetlands utilized by wintering waterfowl such as mallard, pintail and shoveler duck species. The wood duck is found in the refuge and is one of the reasons for the establishment of the Bayou Cocodrie National Wildlife Refuge. Other birds include bald eagle, peregrine falcon, osprey and Swainson's warbler. At least 186 bird species have been identified in the refuge.

The Louisiana black bear, federally listed as threatened since 1992, is known to occur in the Bayou Cocodrie. The historic range of the Louisiana black bear included southern Louisiana, Mississippi and east Texas, and is a subspecies of the American black bear.

== See also ==
- List of National Wildlife Refuges: Louisiana
