= Ulmus 'Planeroides' =

Elm cultivar

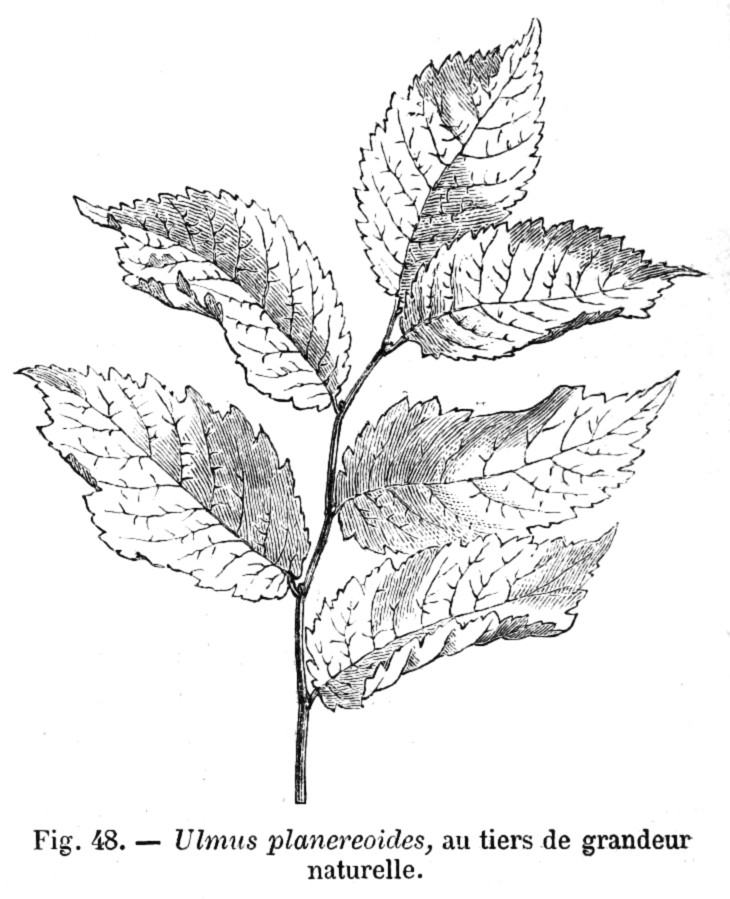
- Leaves of 'Planeroides'
- Genus: Ulmus
- Cultivar: 'Planeroides'
- Origin: France?

The elm cultivar Ulmus 'Planeroides' [:Planera-like elm] was described by Carrière in the Revue horticole, 1875. It was considered "possibly Ulmus carpinifolia" [:U. minor ] by Green.

Not to be confused with Späth's U. montana viminalis which, though "also distributed under the name Planera aquatica", has osier-like leaves, Planera being the old name for Zelkova, a close relative of elm with willow-like leaves.

== Description ==
The tree was described as having leaves like Planera aquatica.

== Pests and diseases ==
Most field elm clones are susceptible to Dutch elm disease.

== Cultivation ==
No specimens are known to survive.

=== Putative specimen ===
A pruned elm with Planera-like leaves, possibly the cultivar 'Planeroides', stands in Stanford Avenue, Brighton.

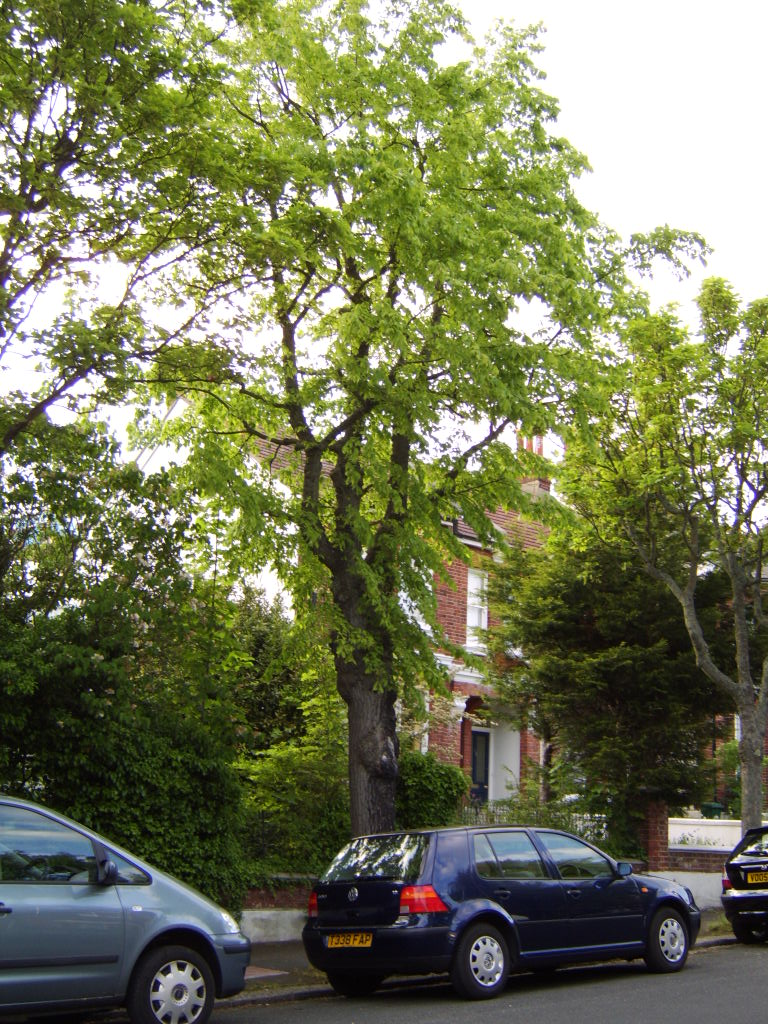
Stanford Avenue tree

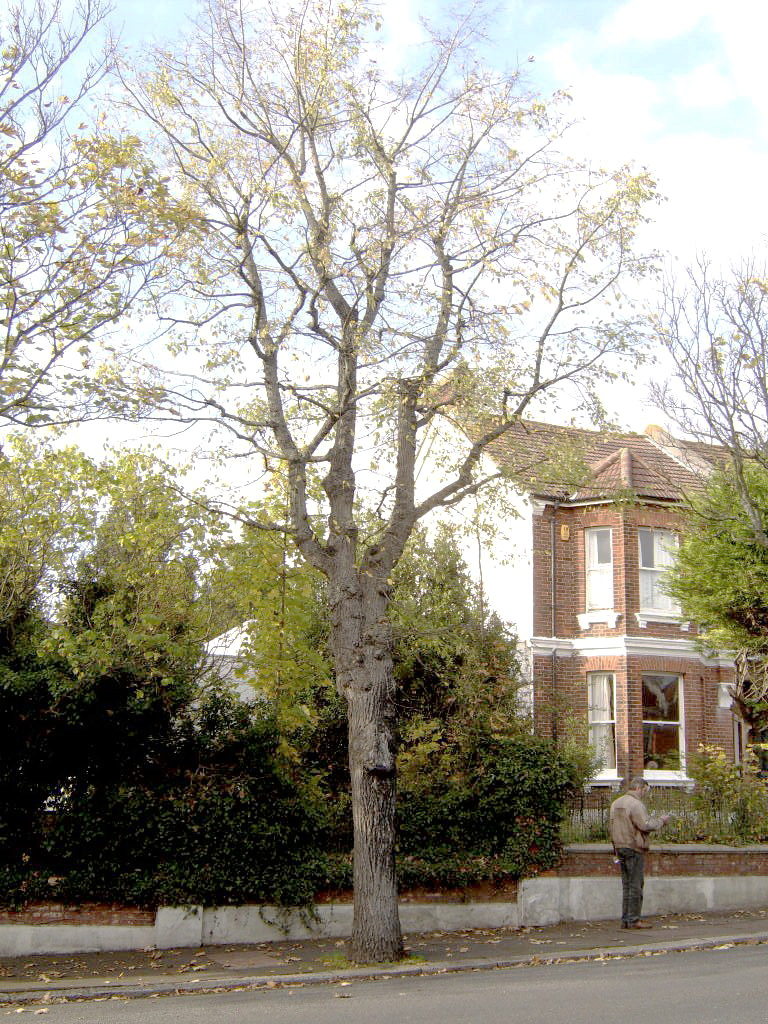
Same, April

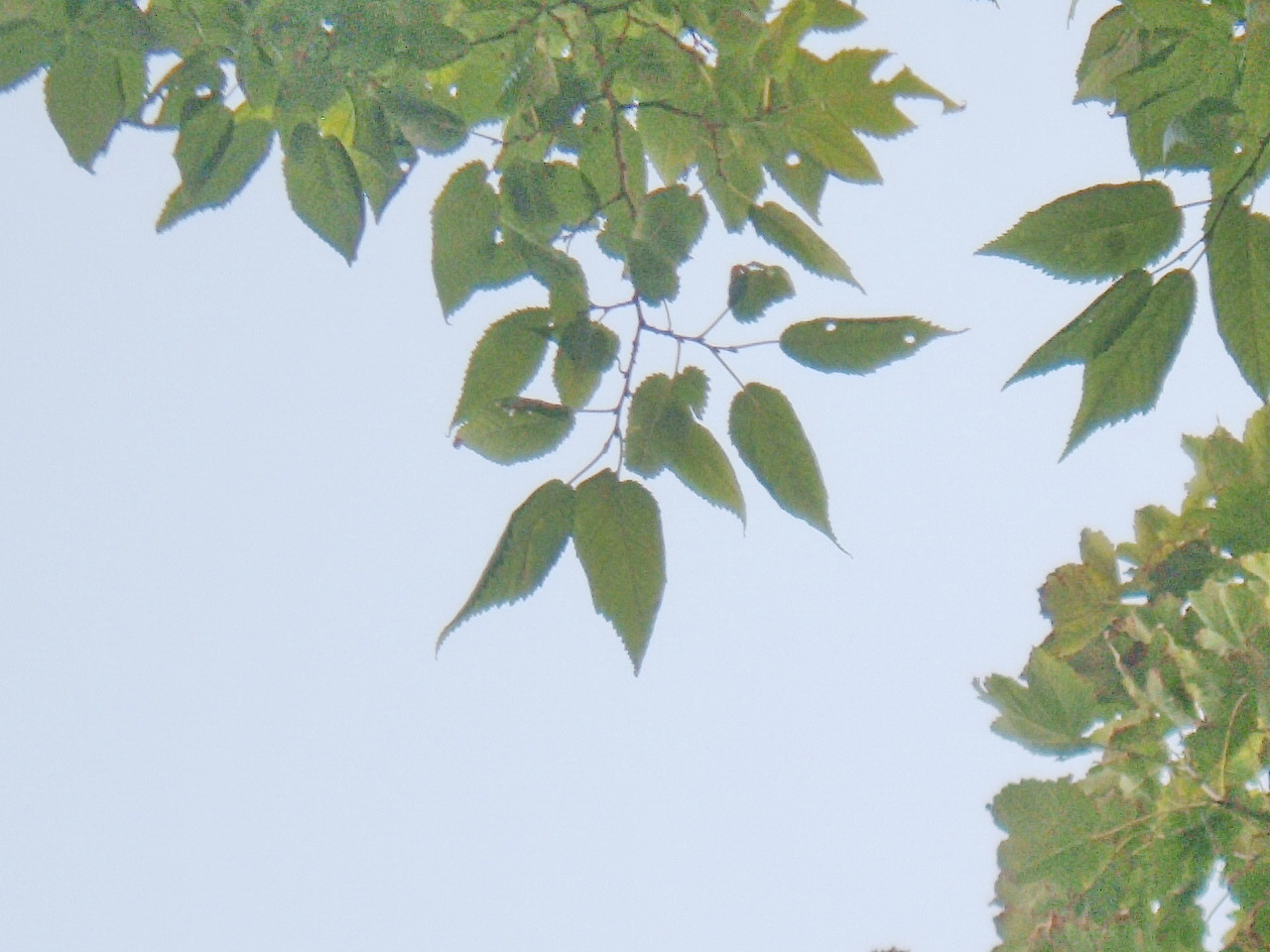
Short-shoot foliage of same

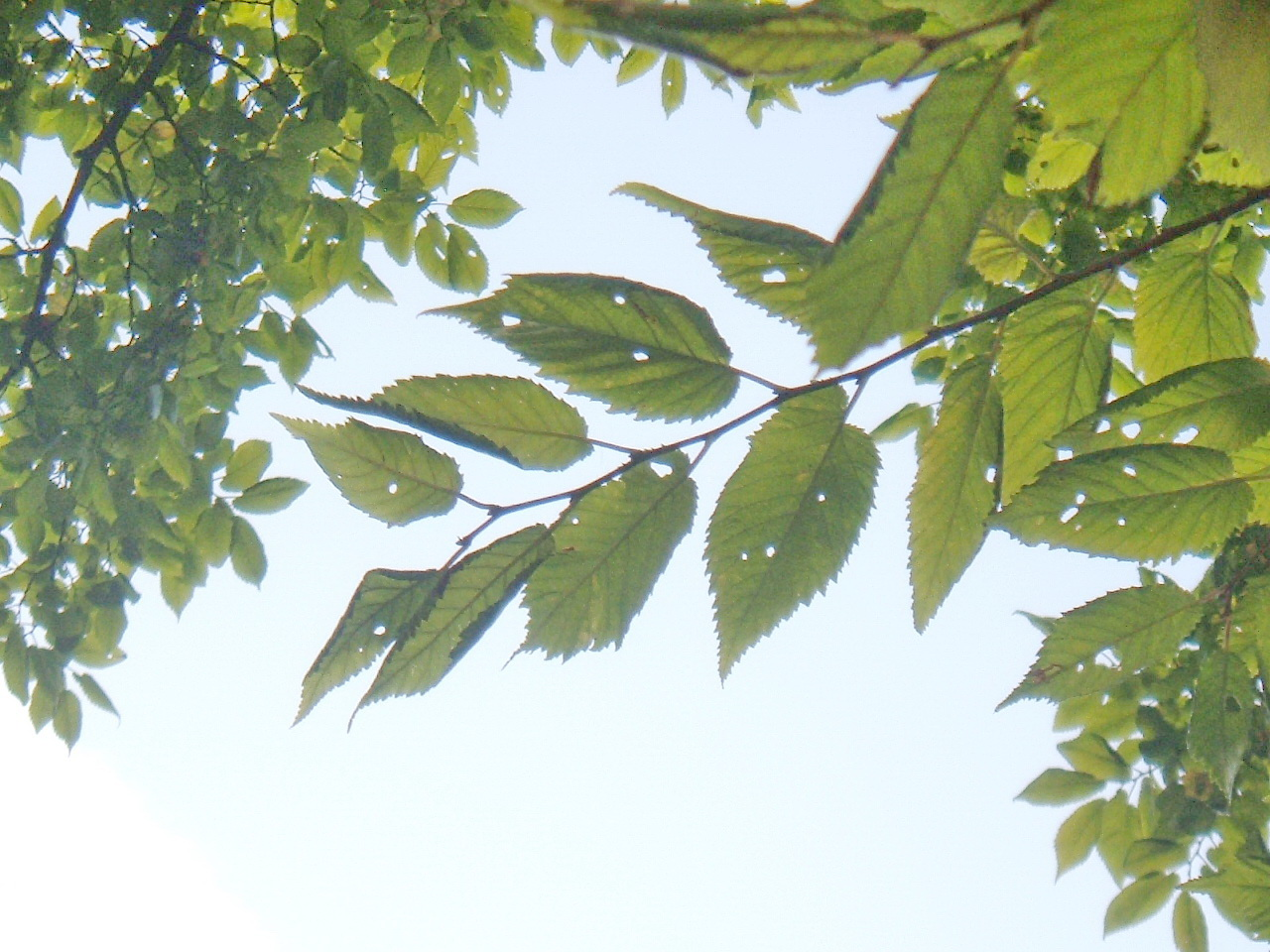
Long-shoot foliage

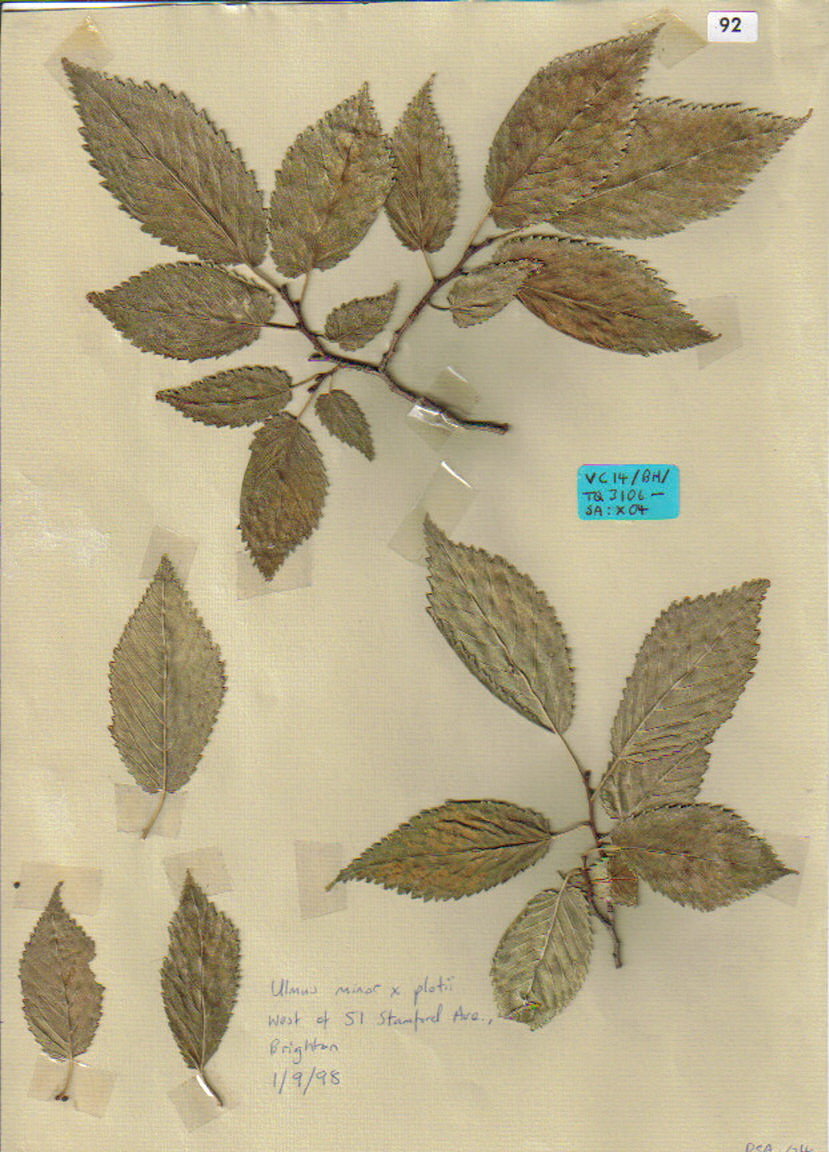
Pressed leaves

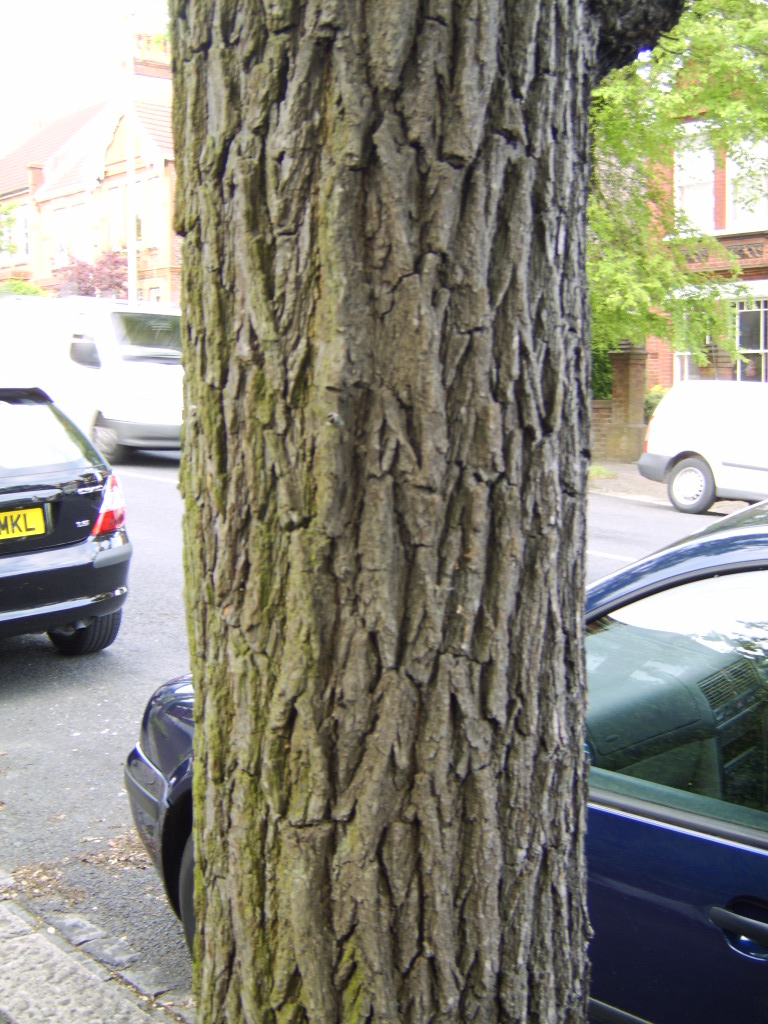
Bark
