= Ulmus × hollandica 'Viminalis' =

Elm cultivar

- Hybrid parentage: U. glabra × U. minor
- Cultivar: 'Viminalis'
- Origin: Europe

The hybrid elm cultivar Ulmus × hollandica 'Viminalis' [:osier-leaved] was listed by the Späth nursery of Berlin as Ulmus scabra Mill. var. viminalis in 1890 and as Ulmus montana viminalis from 1892. Though Späth's catalogues stated that it was "also distributed under the name planera aquatica" (an American species little known in Europe), it remained in his lists under 'elm' and was accessioned by the Dominion Arboretum, Ottawa, and by the Royal Botanic Garden Edinburgh as an elm cultivar. A similar misidentification occurred in the mid-20th century, when the Siberian elm cultivar Ulmus pumila 'Poort Bulten' was for many years commercially propagated under the name Planera aquatica or 'water elm'. As the leaves of osier or Salix viminalis, however, differ markedly from those of Planera aquatica, being long, thin and tapering at both ends, Spath's name 'Viminalis' for this elm cultivar confirms that its leaves were not Planera-like. The probable explanation for the early distribution name is that Planera was the old name for Zelkova, a close relative of elm with willow-like leaves. It is therefore unlikely that 'Viminalis' was related in any way to the 19th-century elm cultivar Ulmus 'Planeroides'.

Not to be confused with Loudon's U. minor 'Viminalis'.

== Description ==
The tree was said to have "small pendulous leaves", a description which suggests an Ulmus × hollandica rather than a wych elm cultivar (Späth used U. montana for both). Beissner noted U. montana viminalis at the Tübingen botanical gardens, falsely named Planera aquatica, which had 'picturesque long overhanging young branches'.

== Pests and diseases ==
Some examples of U. × hollandica possess a moderate resistance to Dutch elm disease.

== Cultivation ==
One specimen of Späth's U. montana viminalis was planted at the Dominion Arboretum, Ottawa, in 1896. Three specimens were supplied by Späth to the Royal Botanic Garden Edinburgh in 1902, and may survive in Edinburgh as it was the practice of the Garden to distribute trees about the city (viz. the Wentworth Elm); the current list of Living Accessions held in the Garden per se does not list the plant.

=== Putative specimens ===
Three old osier-leaved elms which stand in Buckingham Terrace Gardens, on Leith Links (Vanburgh Place), and in Middle Meadows Walk, Edinburgh (2017), may be Späth's 'Viminalis'. They are semi-pendulous suckering trees, girth c.3.5 m, with leaves and samarae confirmed by the Royal Botanic Garden Edinburgh as likely to be U. × hollandica.

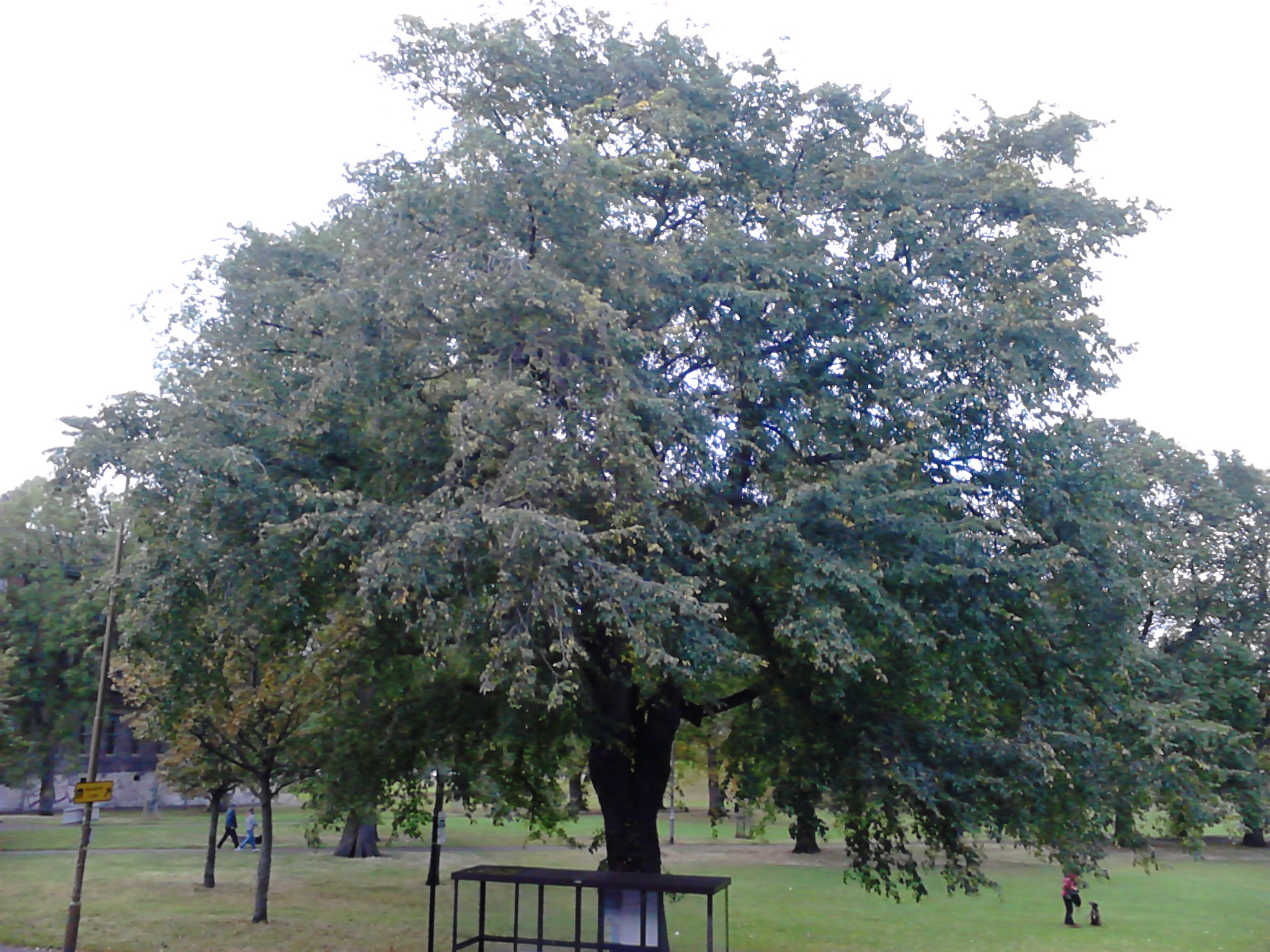
Osier-leaved clone, Leith Links, Edinburgh

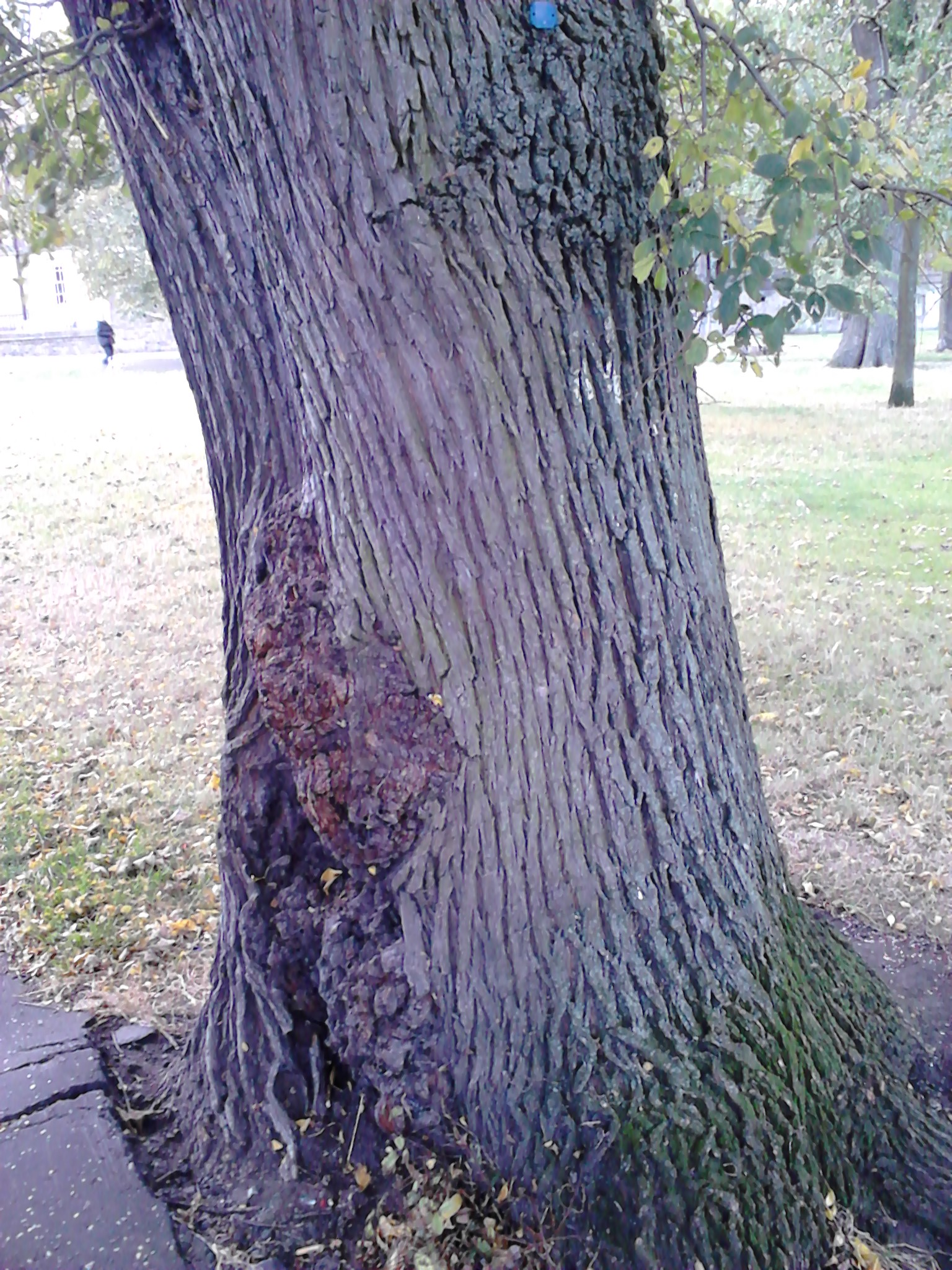
Bark of same

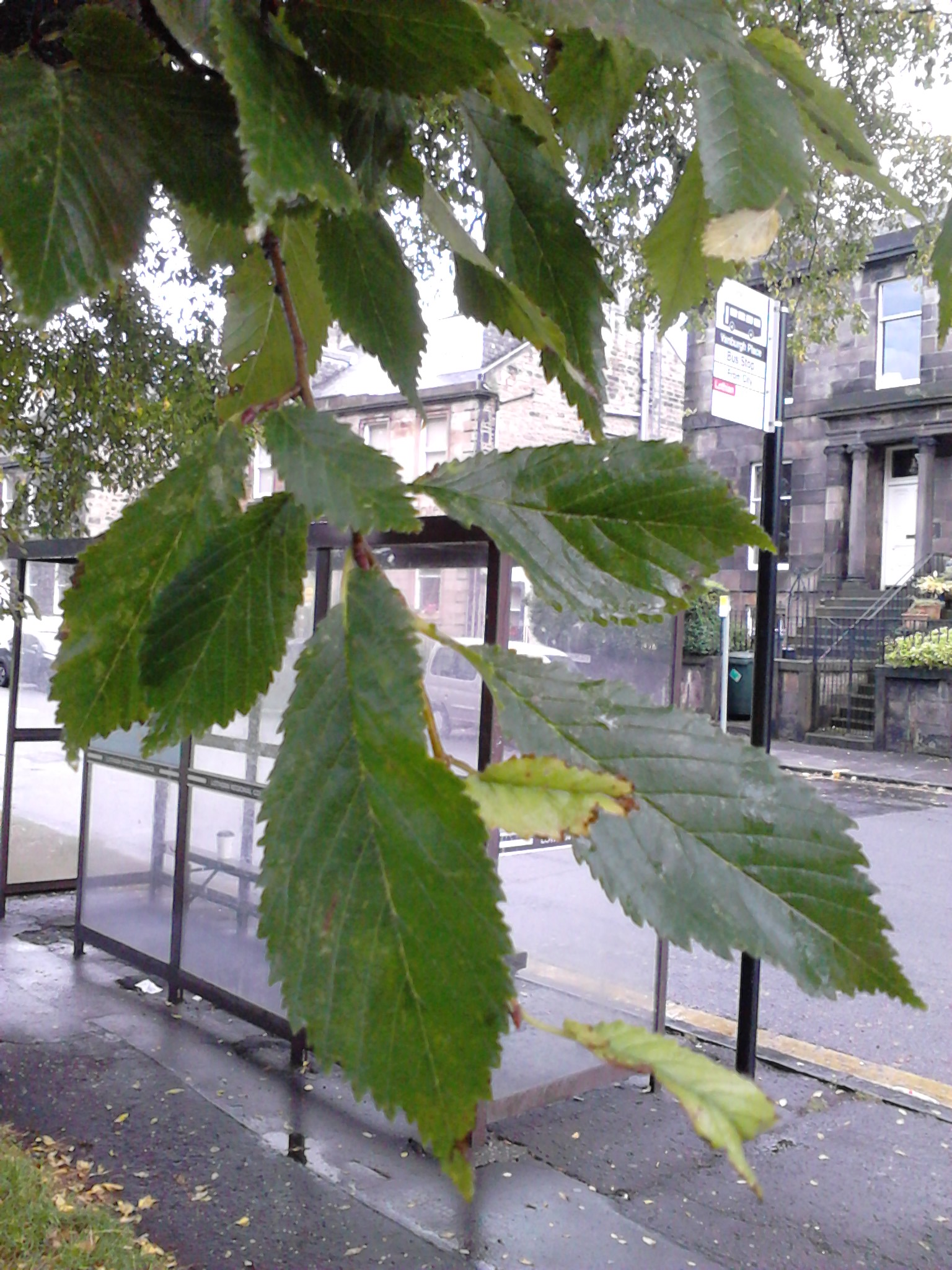
Leaves of same

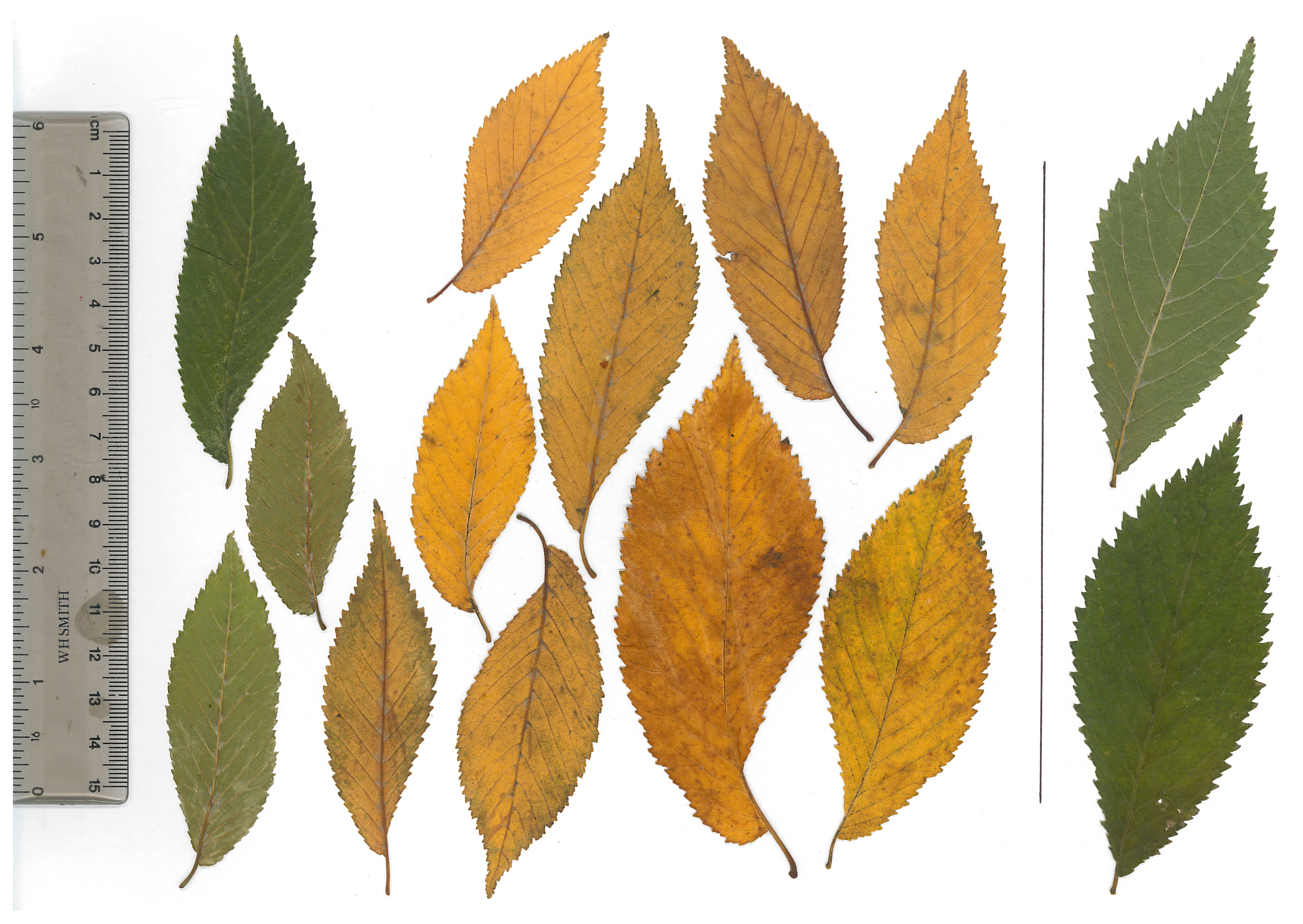
Pressed leaves (juvenile foliage on right)

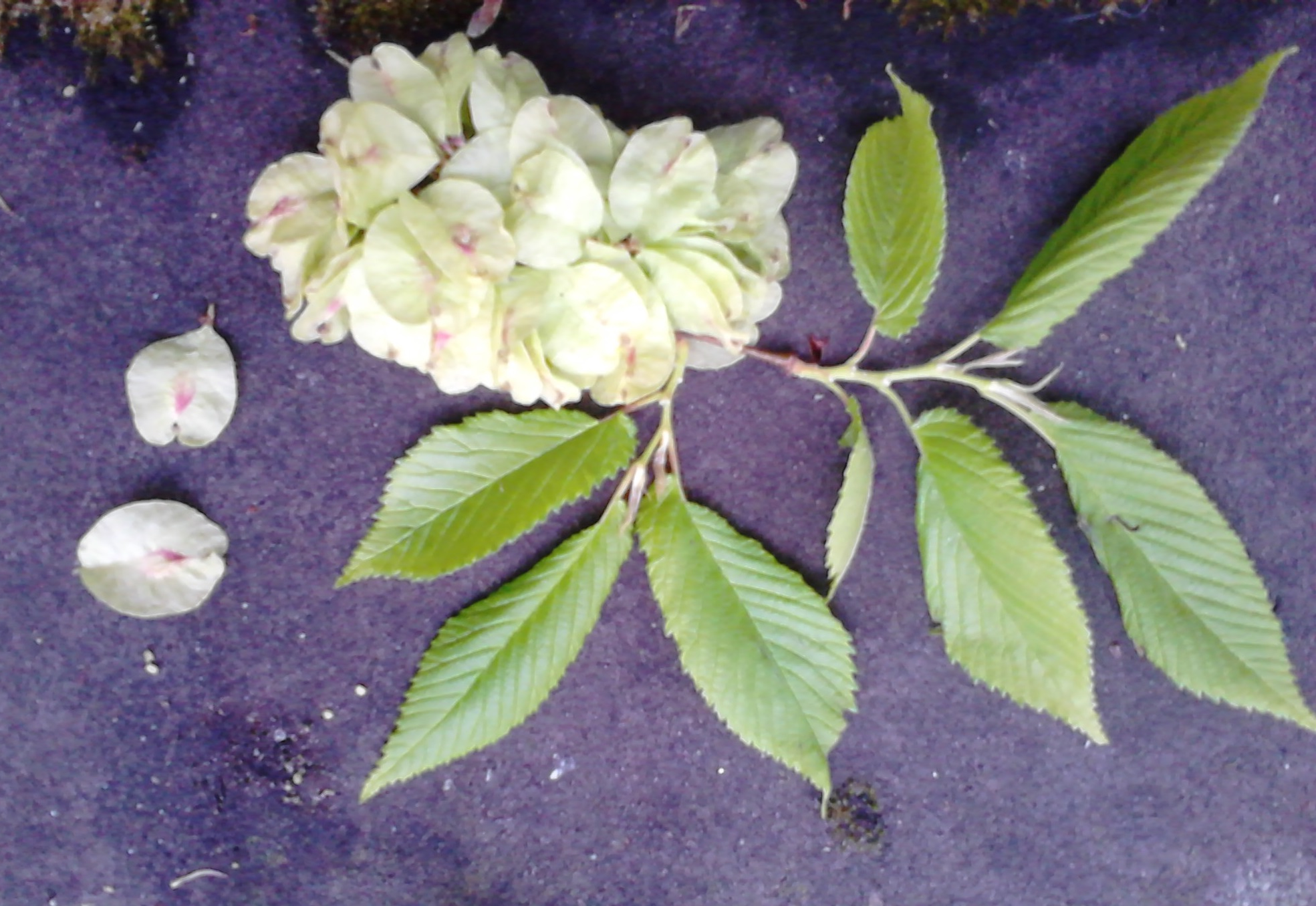
Samarae and new leaves of osier-leaved clone, Buckingham Terrace Gardens, Edinburgh

== Synonymy ==
- U. scabra Mill. var. viminalis ("also called Planera acquatica")
