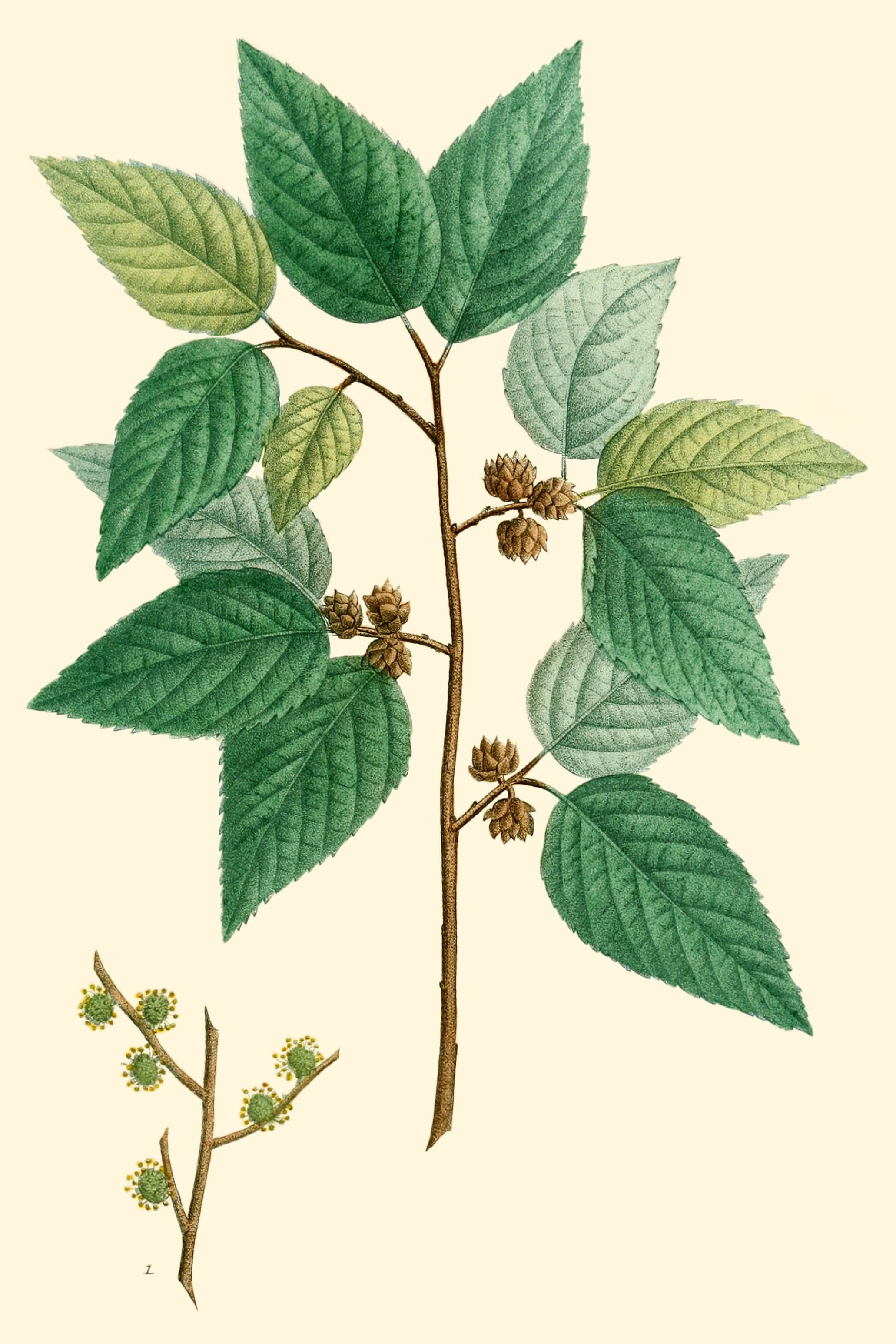
- Planera aquatica

Scientific classification
- Kingdom: Plantae
- Clade: Tracheophytes
- Clade: Angiosperms
- Clade: Eudicots
- Clade: Rosids
- Order: Rosales
- Family: Ulmaceae
- Genus: Planera; J.F.Gmel.

Species
- See text

= Planera =

Genus of flowering plants

Planera is a genus of flowering plants with a single living species, Planera aquatica, the planertree or water elm. The genus has an extensive fossil record dating back to the Cretaceous and spanning the northern hemisphere, with a few southern hemisphere records as well. The living species is found in the southeastern United States, it is a small deciduous tree 10–15 m (390–590 in) tall, closely related to the elms but with a softly, prickly nut 10–15 mm (0.39–0.59 in) diameter, instead of a winged seed. It grows, as the name suggests, on wet sites. Despite its common English name, this species is not a true elm, although it is a close relative of the elms (species of the genus Ulmus). It is also subject to Dutch elm disease, a disease which affects only members of the Ulmaceae. It is native to most of the southeast United States. It is hardy down to Zone 7.

== Species ==
- Planera aquatica

=== Fossil species ===
- †Planera antiqua Heer, 1883 (Santonian-Campanian; Paatuut Formation, Greenland)
- †Planera aquaticiformis Hollick, 1936 (Paleocene/Eocene; "Berg Lake flora", Alaska)
- †Planera australis Ettingshausen, 1887 (Late Cretaceous; Otago, New Zealand)
- †Planera chankaensis Pavlyutkin, 2005 (Miocene; Novokachalinsk, Russia)
- †Planera crenata Newberry, 1883 (jr homonym, replacement name P. lingualis)
- †Planera cretacea Berry, 1907 (Cretaceous; North Carolina)
- †Planera dubia Lesquereux, 1859 (Eocene, Chuckanut Formation, Washington)
- †Planera emarginata (Göppert) Heer, 1856 (Tortonian, Poland)
- †Planera ezoana Ôishi & Huzioka, 1954 (Eocene; Hokkaido, Japan)
- †Planera hebridica Simpson, 1961 ("Cenozoic"; Isle of Mull, Scotland)
- †Planera knowltoniana Newberry, 1896 (Cenomanian; Raritan Formation, Virginia)
- †Planera mullensis Simpson, 1961 ("Cenozoic"; Isle of Mull, Scotland)
- †Planera myricifolia (Lesquereux) Cockerell, 1908 (Priabonian; Florissant Formation, Colorado)
- †Planera parvula Saporta, 1888 (Oligocene; France)
- †Planera subkeaki (Rérolle) Saporta, 1888 (Tortonian; La Cerdagnya, France)
- †Planera thompsoniana Traverse, 1955 (Burdigalian; Brandon lignite, Vermont)
- †Planera ulmifolia Schloemer-Jäger, 1958 (Paleocene; Brøgger peninsula, Spitsbergen)
- †Planera variabilis Newberry, 1883 (Ypresian; Green River Formation, Wyoming)

=== Species formerly included in Planera ===
- †Abelicea ungeri (Kováts ex Ettingshausen) Holmboe
- †Cedrelospermum nervosum (Newberry) Manchester
- †Chaetoptelea microphylla (Newberry) Hickey
- †Fagopsis longifolia Lesquereux
