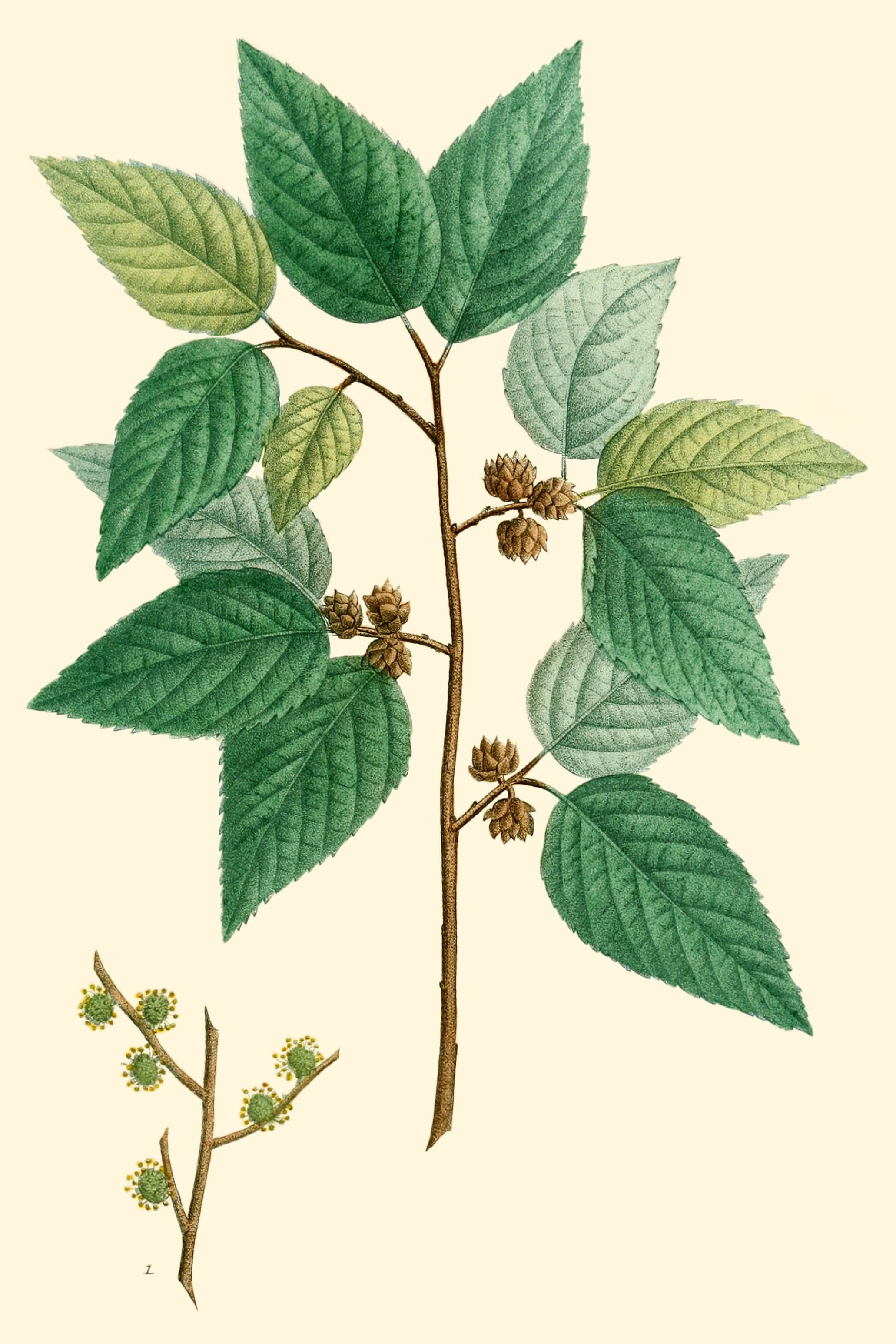

Conservation status
- Least Concern (IUCN 3.1)

Scientific classification
- Kingdom: Plantae
- Clade: Tracheophytes
- Clade: Angiosperms
- Clade: Eudicots
- Clade: Rosids
- Order: Rosales
- Family: Ulmaceae
- Genus: Planera
- Species: P. aquatica

Binomial name
- Planera aquatica J.F.Gmel.
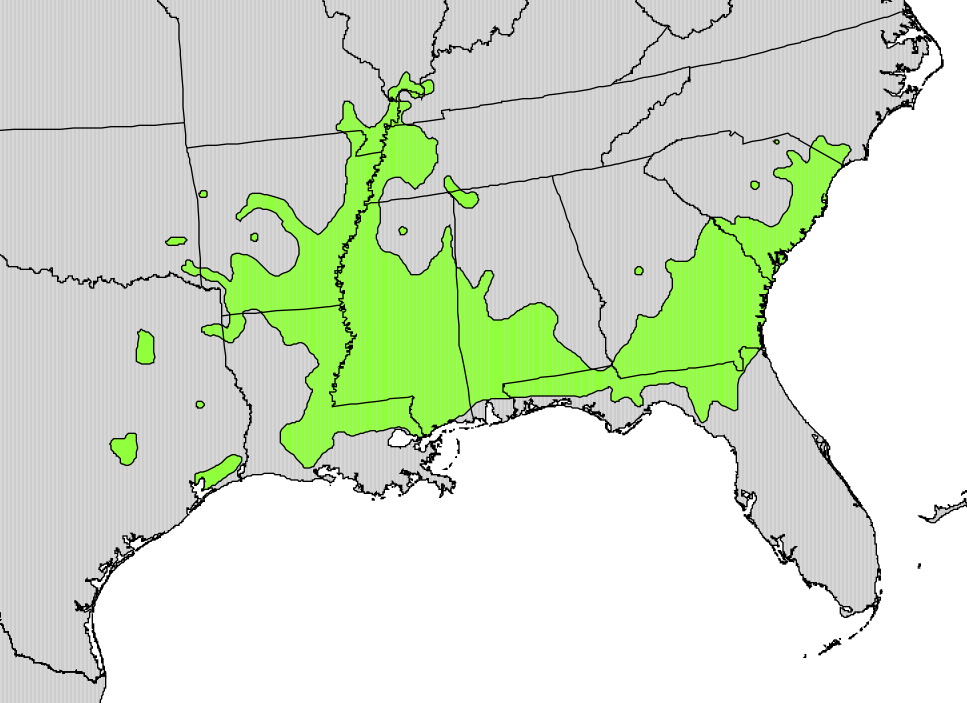
- Natural range of the water elm

= Planera aquatica =

Water elm

Species of flowering plants

Planera aquatica, the planertree or water elm, is a species of flowering plant. Found in the southeastern United States, it is a small deciduous tree 10–15 m tall, closely related to the elms but with a softly, prickly nut 10–15 mm diameter, instead of a winged seed. It grows, as the name suggests, on wet sites. Despite its common English name, this species is not a true elm, although it is a close relative of the elms (species of the genus Ulmus). It is also subject to Dutch elm disease, a disease which affects only members of the Ulmaceae. It is native to most of the southeast United States. It is hardy down to Zone 7.

== Description ==
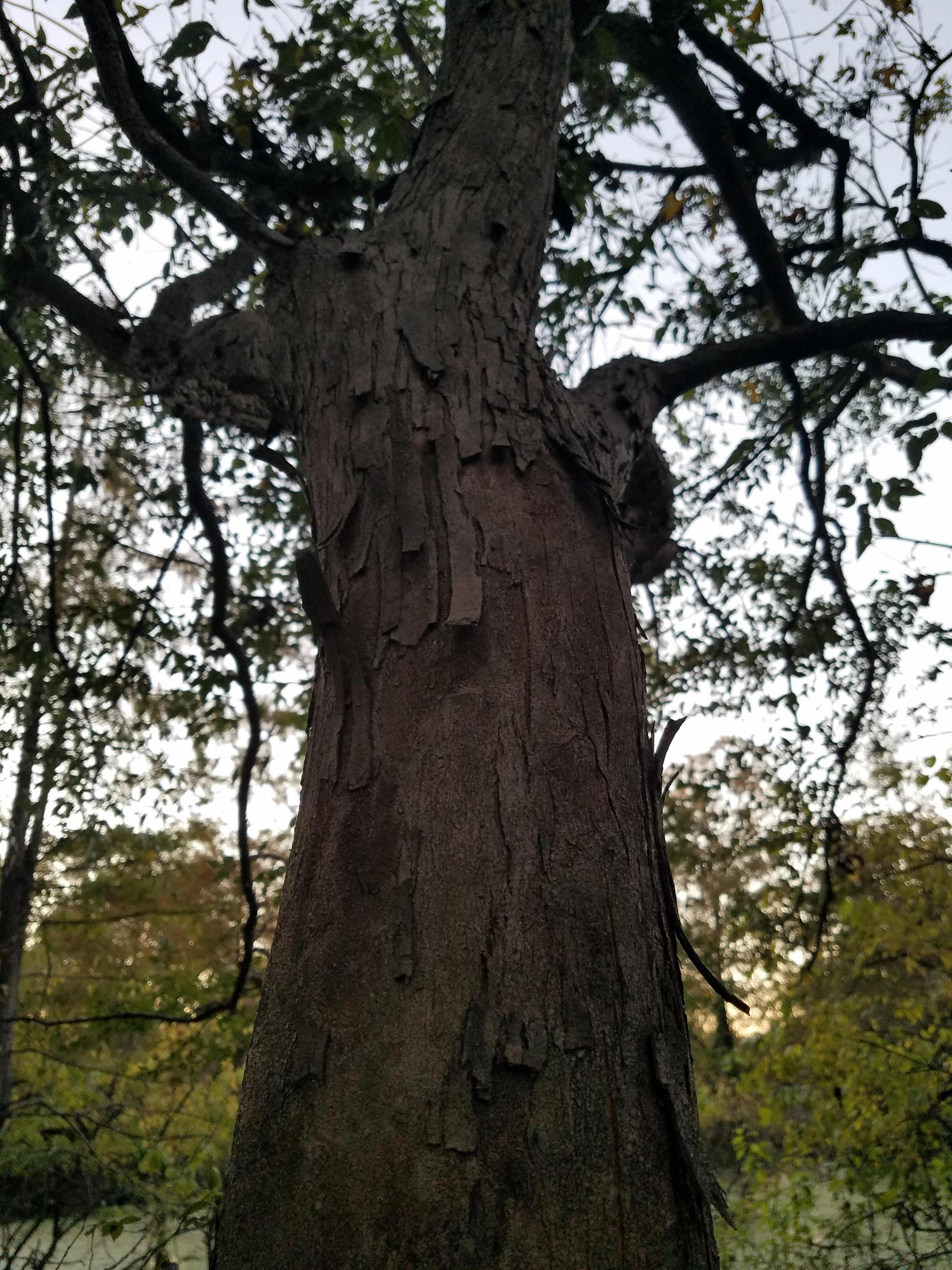
Bark

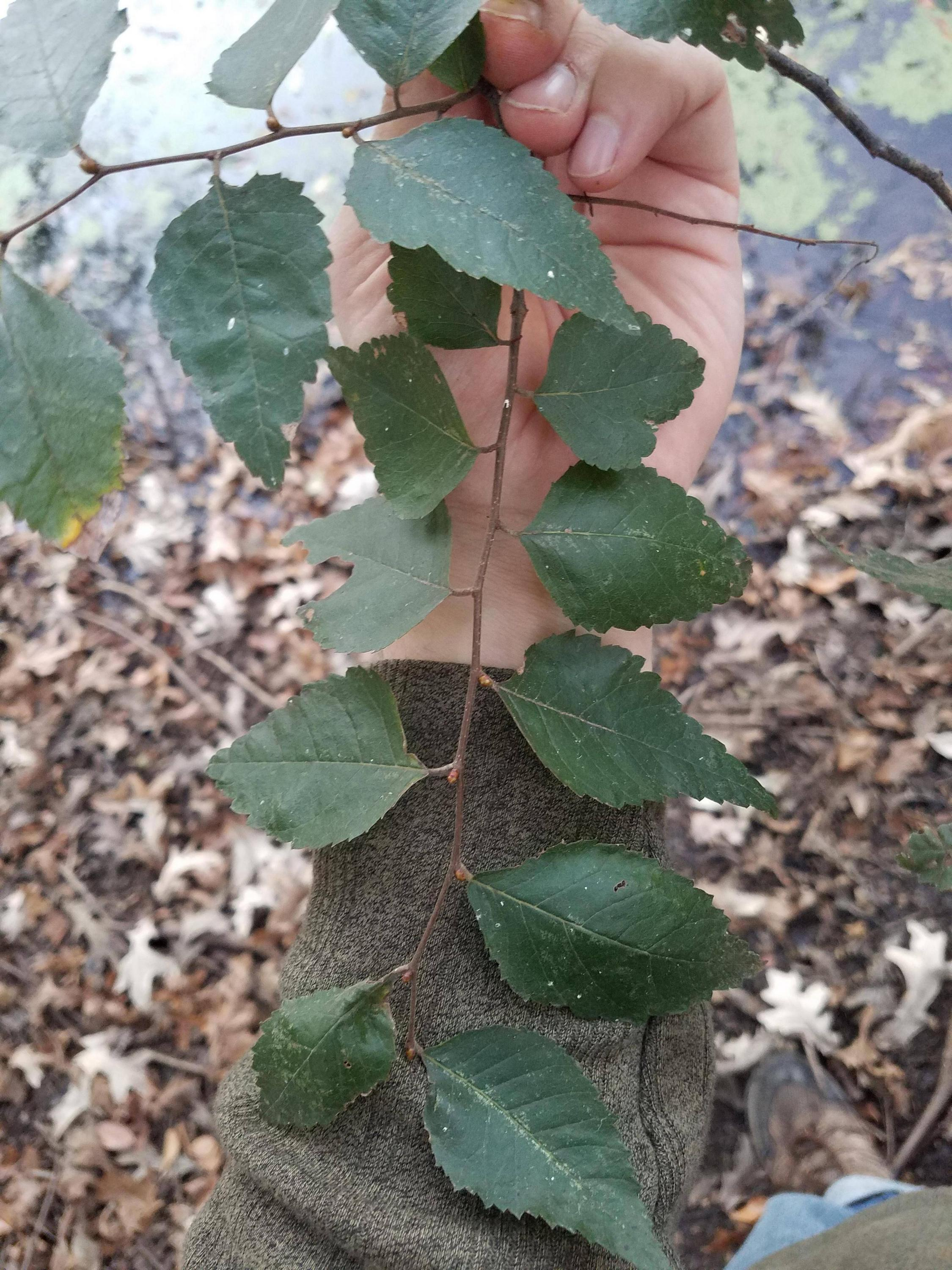
Leaves

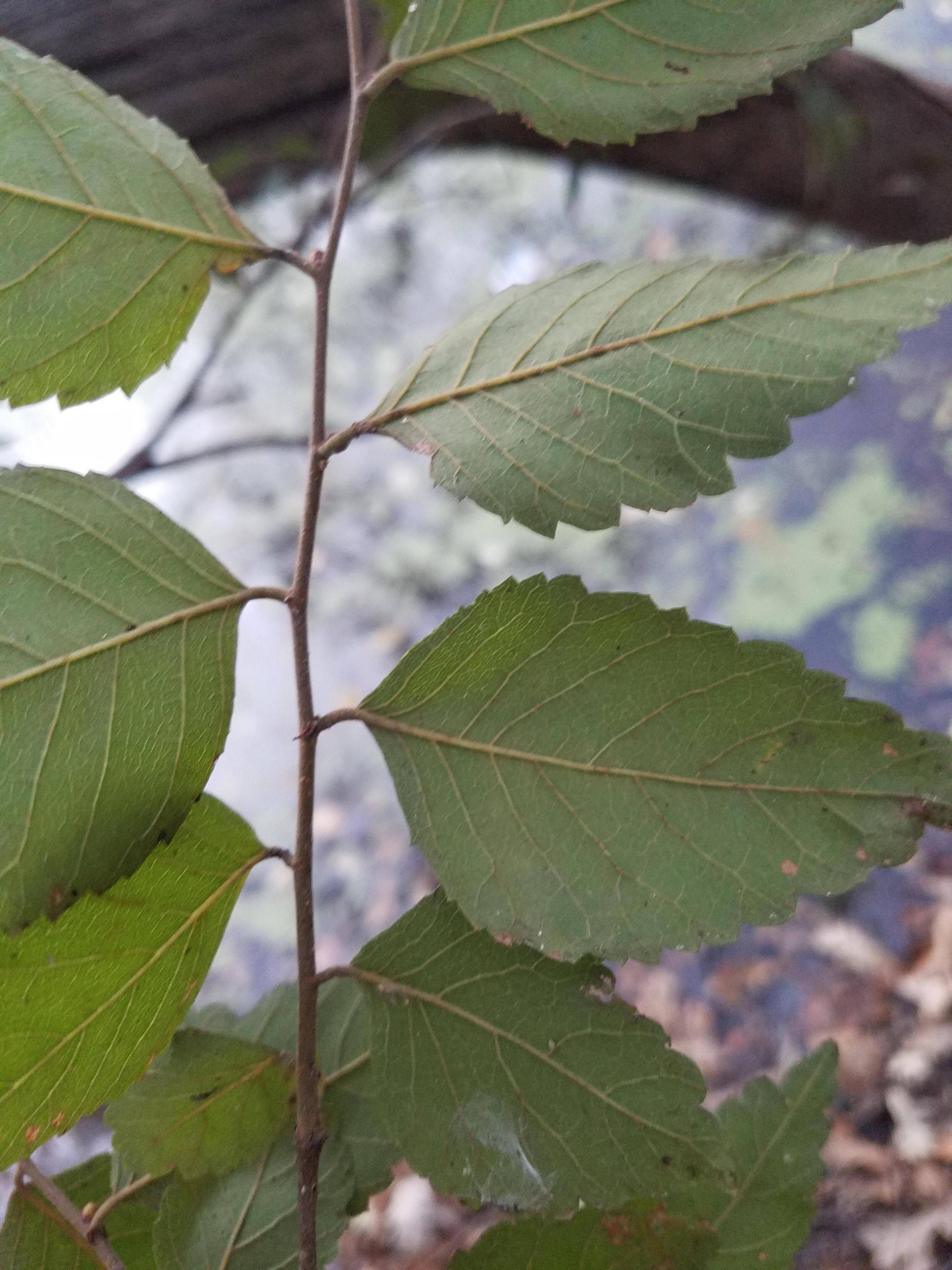
Leaf underside displaying pubescence

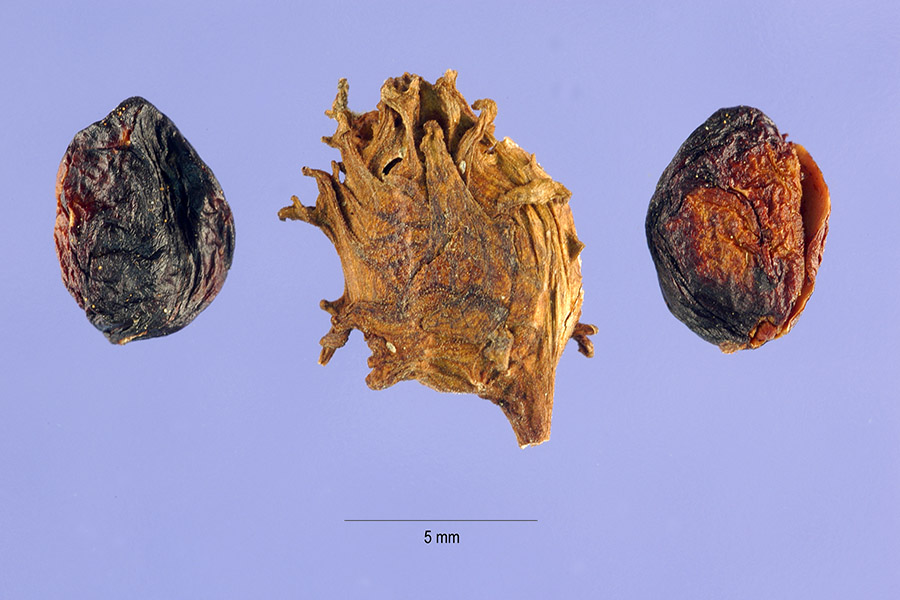
Fruit with and without shell
- Leaves: alternate, 3–7 cm long, with irregularly serrated to double serrated margins. Leaf base wedge-shaped or rounded. Leaf base often equal and symmetrical, but can be asymmetrical. Thin pubescent hair is often present on underside of leaf.
- Bark: gray-brown, thin, some flaky loose scales. Exfoliates to reveal red-brown area under bark.
- Fruit: a drupe. Has a green shell that turns brown with age. Matures April - May.

=== Distinguishing characteristics ===
While often confused with true elms, it can be easily distinguished by noticing the fruit are drupes and not samaras. When fruit are not in season, the flaky bark is unique to water elm and not characteristic of true elms.

May also be confused with Celtis (hackberries), but hackberry leaves have pronounced lower lateral veins not found on water elm.

== Ecology ==
Typically found on alluvial floodplains subjected to seasonal or temporary flooding. Often found in swamps, streams, lakes, or in riparian areas. Has some wildlife value, food for bees and some bird species. Prefers sandy or gravelly, moist soils.

Classified as an obligate wetland plant (OBL).
